= Van Bredael =

Surname list

van Bredael or Van Bredael is a Flemish surname. Notable people with the surname include:

- Alexander van Bredael (1663–1720), Flemish painter
- Jan Frans van Bredael (1686–1750), Flemish painter
- Jan Pieter van Bredael the Younger (1683–1735), Flemish painter
- Joris van Bredael (1661–c. 1706), Flemish painter
- Joseph van Bredael (1688–1739), Flemish painter
- Peeter van Bredael (1629–1719), Flemish painter
