= Jan Frans Soolmaker =

Flemish painter and draughtsman

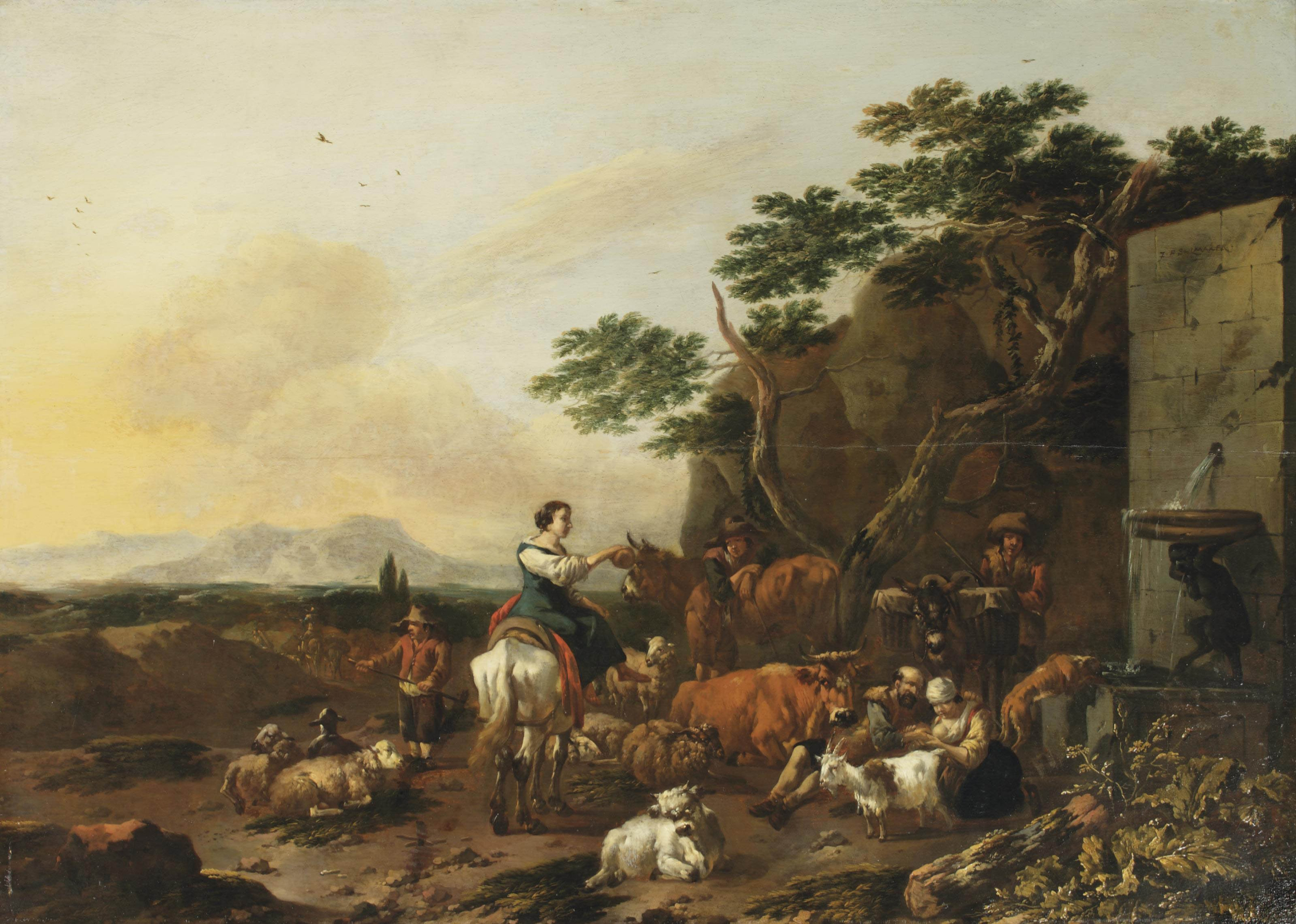
Italianate landscape with shepherds and their stock resting near a fountain

Jan Frans Soolmaker (1635 – after 1665, possibly 1686) was a Flemish painter and draughtsman, mainly known for his Italianizing landscapes, with equestrian and arcadian scenes. He worked in Antwerp, Haarlem and Amsterdam. He is regarded as one of the most faithful followers of the Dutch painter Nicolaes Berchem.

== Life ==
Jan Frans Soolmaker was likely born in Antwerp. He is recorded in April 1654 upon becoming a pupil of the little known Jan de Bruin in Antwerp. It appears he did not complete his studies with the Bruin, but rather moved to Haarlem. Because of the similarity in style, it is believed that in Haarlem he was likely a pupil of Nicolaes Berchem. There is no record of him joining the Haarlem Guild of Saint Luke. It is assumed he later joined the Amsterdam Guild.

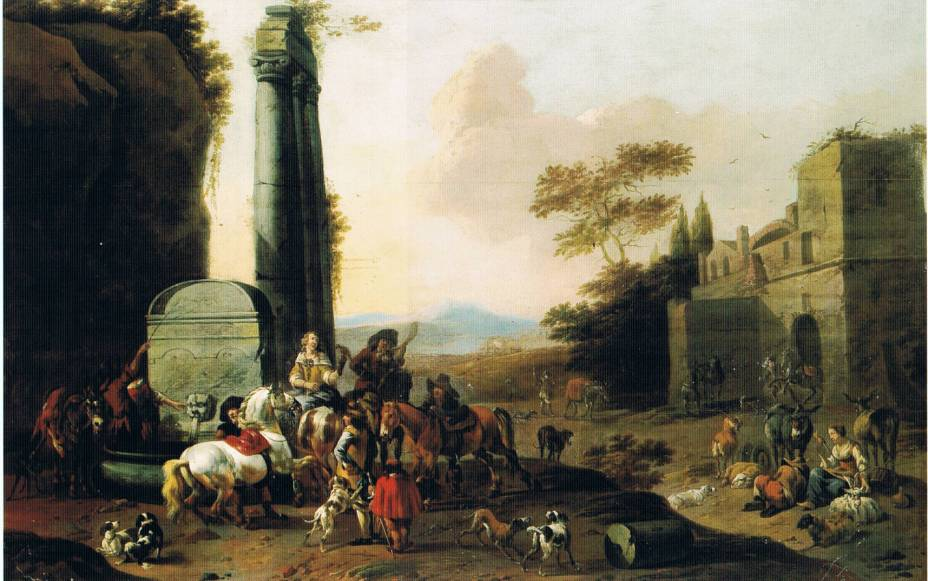
Resting horsemen by a fountain

Soolmaker is recorded in December 1665 as drawing up his last will. It was the usual practice in the 17th century for people to draft their will before starting out on a perilous journey. He apparently intended to travel to Italy via Portugal. It is not clear whether he in fact set out on that journey.

A signed Italian landscape dated 1668 was sold by Mak van Waay on 8 October 1973 in Amsterdam. Should that date be authentic, it has to be assumed he was still alive two years after drafting his last will. No other dated works by his hand are known. A clearly signed view of the Escorial sold at Christie's, London on 9 July 1976 could mean that he completed at least part of his intended trip and visited Spain. No Italian sources or records regarding any residence in Italy exist.

The date and place of his death are not known.

== Work ==
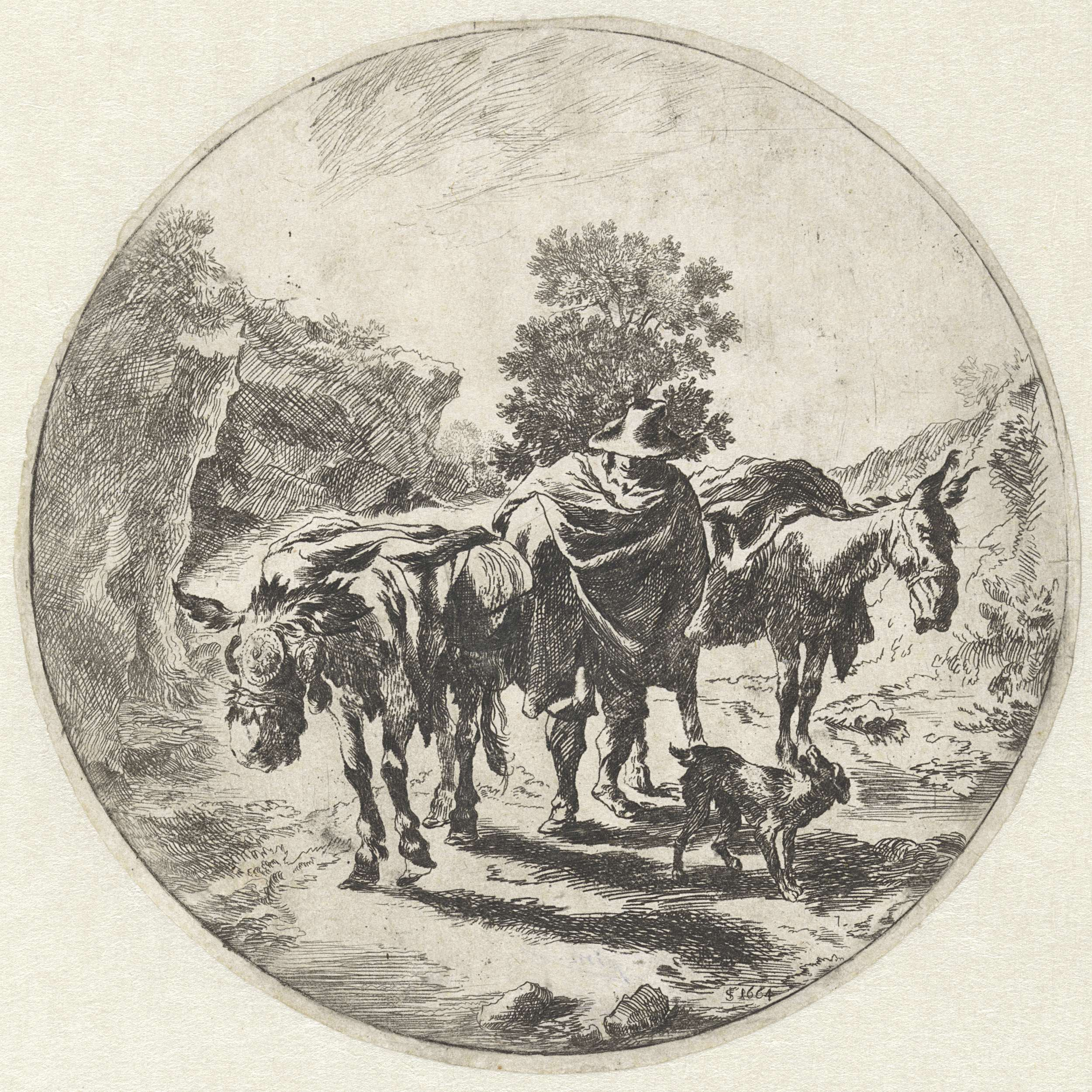
Man with donkeys

Soolmaker had a relatively short career and this explains the small body of work of the artist. Aside from the Escorial painting (if not a copy after someone else's work), no work produced outside of the Low Countries is recorded.

His works imitate Berchem's style and he is sometimes regarded as one of the best imitators of Berchem. It has in fact happened in the past that art dealers have tried to pass off his work as that of Berchem sometimes by adding fake Berchem signatures. This was the case with the Travellers resting by a fountain (sold at Jean Moust Old Master Paintings as by Soolmaker).

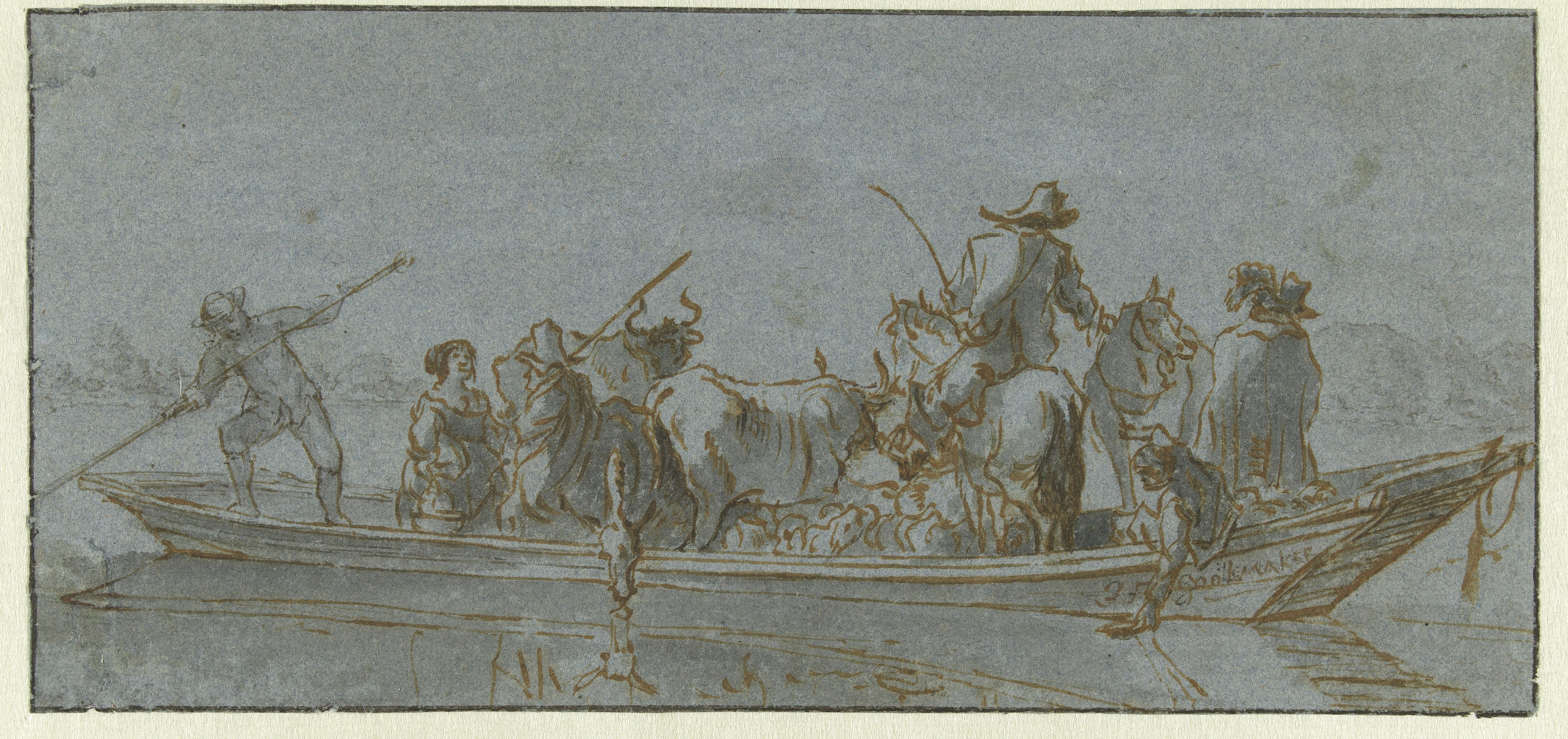
The ferry

Some of his works also show themes and motifs inspired by or even copied after Philips Wouwerman. This was quite common among Antwerp painters from the second half of the 17th century such as for instance Simon Johannes van Douw and various members of the van Bredael family. One of the themes borrowed from Wouwerman often recurring in his work is a father and son looking at a horseman who is about to mount a white horse. This can be seen in the Resting horsemen by a fountain (sold by Jean Moust Old Master Paintings). Another often recurring theme is the shepherds with their flock such as in the Shepherdess and a Flock of Sheep in the Hermitage Museum.

Soolmaker was also a printmaker. A print of a Man with Donkeys dated 1664 is in the collection of the Rijksmuseum.
