= Abraham van Diepenbeeck =

17th-century Dutch painter

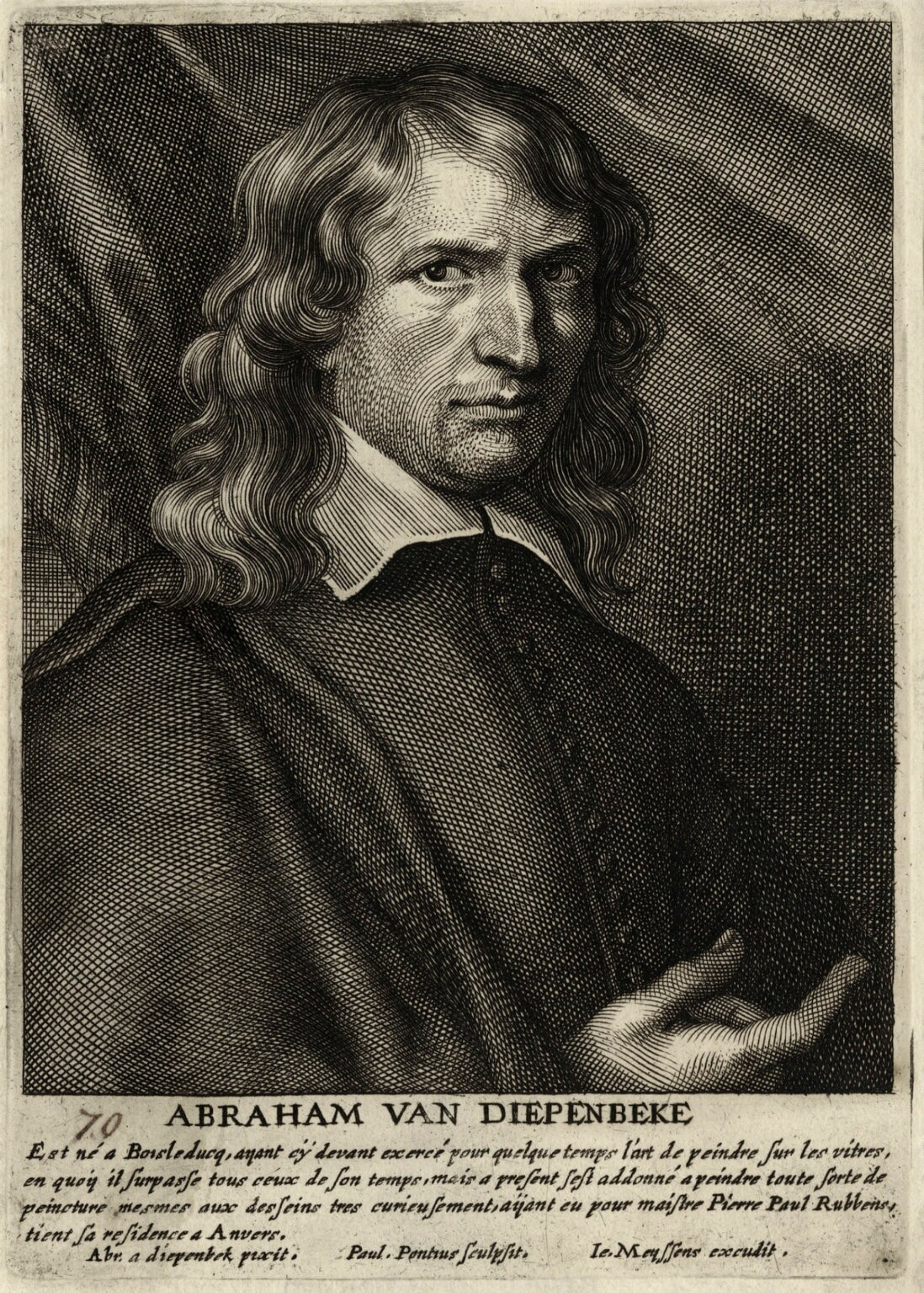
Portrait of van Diepenbeeck in Het Gulden Cabinet, after a self-portrait

Abraham van Diepenbeeck (9 May 1596 (baptised) – between May and September 1675) was a Dutch painter, draftsman, glass painter, print maker and tapestry designer who worked most of his active career in Antwerp. He designed glass windows for various churches and monasteries in Antwerp for which he made many design drawings and oil sketches. He engraved and designed many prints which were published by prominent Antwerp printers such as van Meurs, the Plantin Press and Martinus van den Enden the Elder. He had a close relationship with the workshop of the leading Flemish Baroque painter Peter Paul Rubens and collaborated on various projects under the direction of Rubens. In the 1630s van Diepenbeeck started to create monumental paintings. His work was influenced by Rubens and Anthony van Dyck.

== Life ==
Van Diepenbeeck was born in 's-Hertogenbosch as the son of the glass painter Jan Roelofsz. van Diepenbeeck. The early Dutch biographer Arnold Houbraken alleged that van Diepenbeeck was in Italy to study glass painting likely in the late 1610s or early 1620s. Modern scholarship has cast some doubt on this study time in Italy. It is believed that he studied with his father and left 's-Hertogenbosch for Antwerp after his father's death in 1620. It is possible that his move from his home town in 1621 was related to the war negotiations that were underway that year, which particularly threatened the northern border provinces of the Southern Netherlands, where 's Hertogenbosch was located.

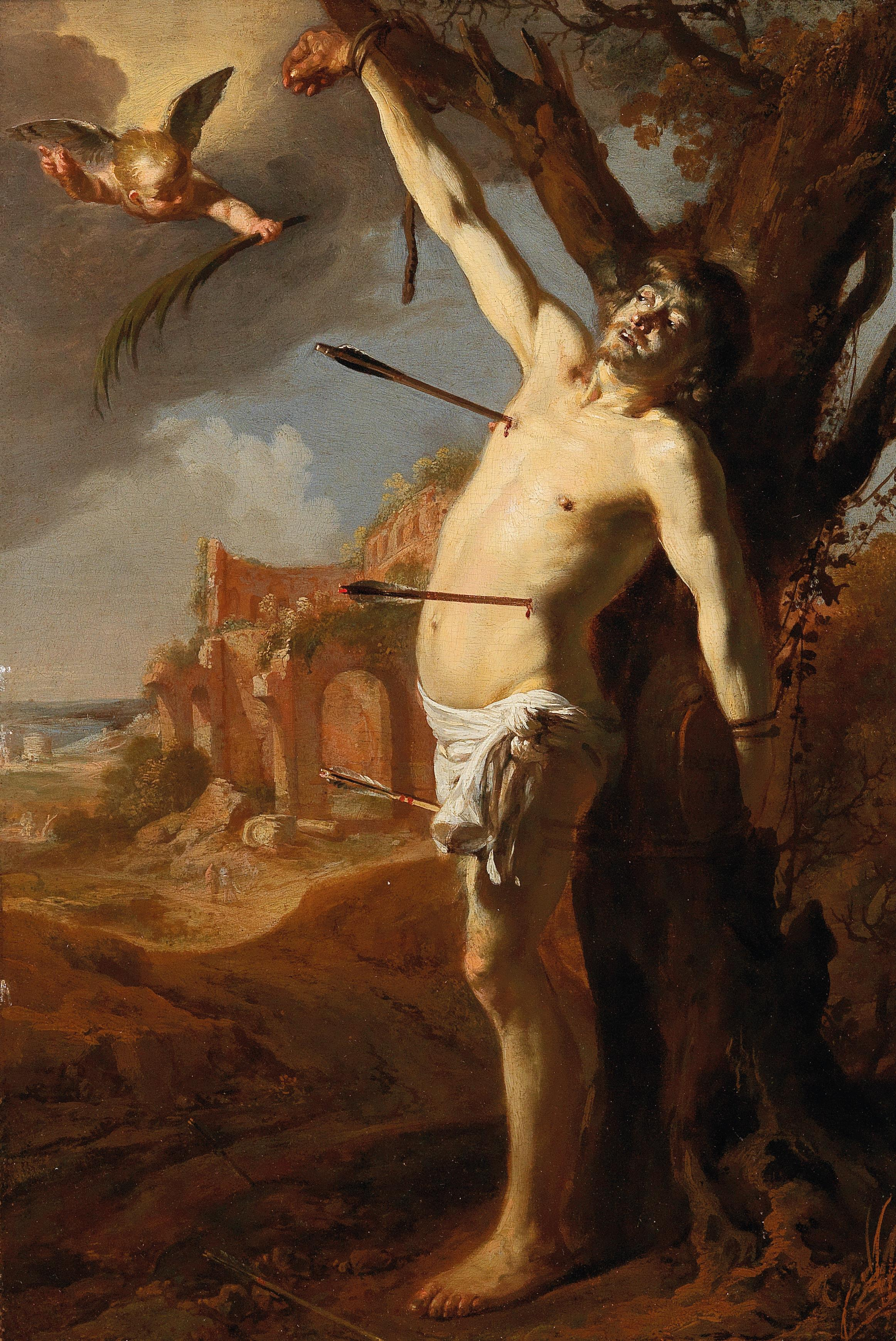
Martyrdom of Saint Sebastian

He was registered in the Antwerp Guild of Saint Luke as a glass painter ('gelaesschryver') in the guild year 1622–23. It is believed that in the years 1626-1627 he assisted, along with the workshop of Rubens, with the cartoons for the tapestry series of The Adoration of the Eucharist. In 1627 he designed on the instruction of Rubens drawing for the frontispiece of the book Vitae patrum. De vita et verbis seniorum, sive, Historiae eremiticae libri X. Auctoribus suis et nitori pristino nestituti, ac notationibus illustrati, opera et studio Heriberti Ros-weydi Vltraiectini, e soc. Jesu theologi published in 1628 by the Plantin Press in Antwerp. Around 1632 Rubens requested van Diepenbeeck to travel to France to make drawings after frescoes by Francesco Primaticcio (1504–157) and Nicolò dell'Abate (ca. 1509–1571) in Paris and Fontainebleau.

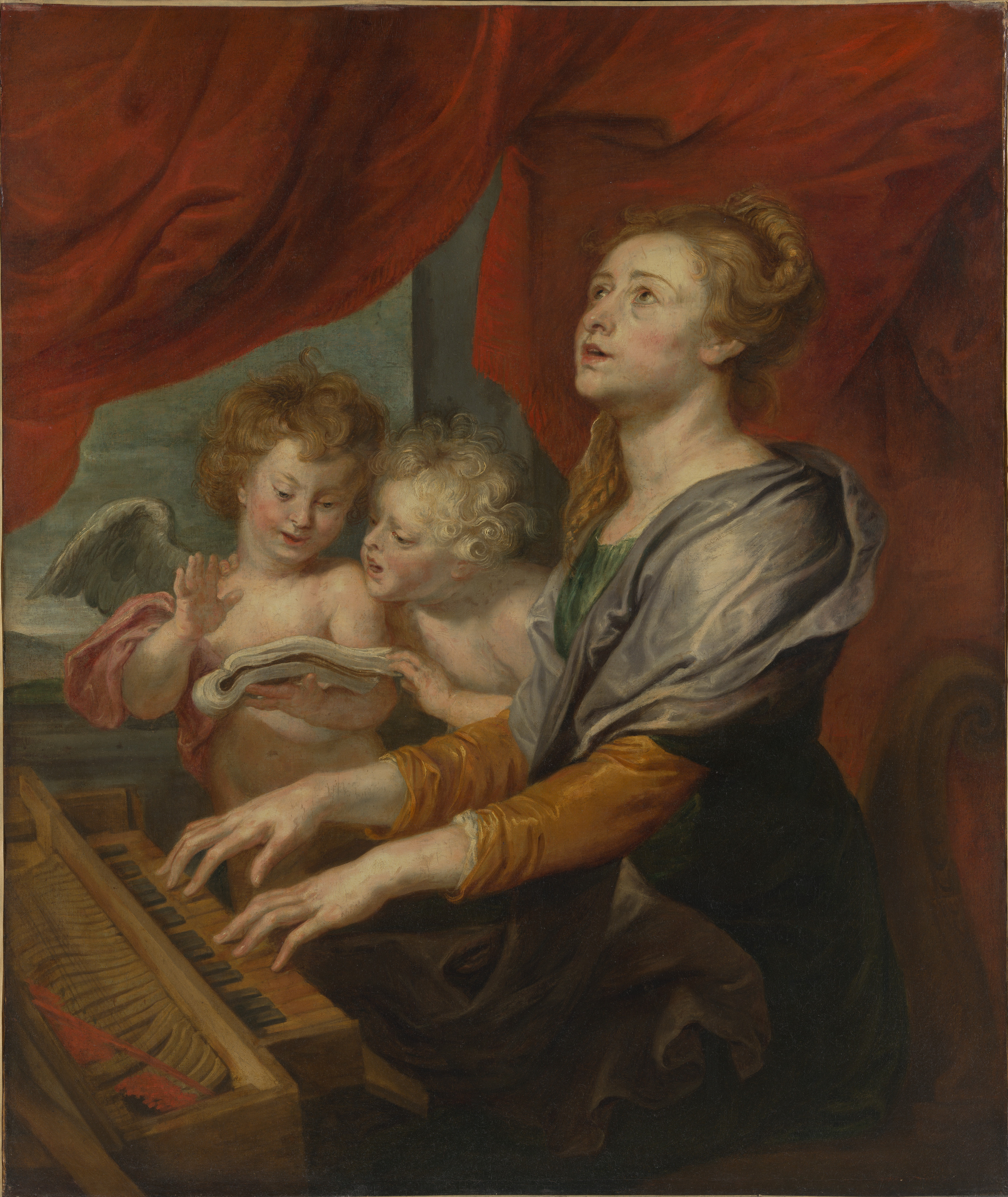
Saint Cecilia

He became a member of the Sodality of the Unmarried Men of Age ('Sodaliteit der bejaerde jongmans') in April 1634 and a consultor of this Sodality in September 1634 and September 1636. On 4 January 1636 he was registered as a poorter (citizen) of Antwerp. He married in June 1637 Catharina Heuvick, daughter of Luc Heuvick, notary of Antwerp and Schelle. The couple had eight children. On 13 June 1639 he became consultor of the Sodality of the Married Men of Age ('Sodaliteit der getrouwden'). He became a master painter and glass painter of the Guild of St. Luke in the Guild year 1638–1639. Van Diepenbeeck had his whole career great difficulties with the Guild and many of his colleagues. He was elected, against his own wishes, to serve as the dean of the guild during the guild year 1642–1643. He refused to present the annual accounts of the guild for that year which were then prepared by Guillam Leestens in his stead. He employed the engraver Hendrik Snijders II on 1 September 1642.

In 1648 the Antwerp painter Gonzales Coques undertook to supply a series of monumental paintings on the life of Psyche for the Huis Honselaarsdijk, a palace of the Stadtholder Frederick Henry, Prince of Orange (1584–1647). The paintings in the series were to be made after designs by van Diepenbeeck and were executed by other painters from Antwerp. As in 1652 Van Diepenbeeck had still not been paid the financial compensation for his work he filed a lawsuit against Coques. As at the beginning of the 19th century a large portion of the palace was destroyed, the paintings do not survive.

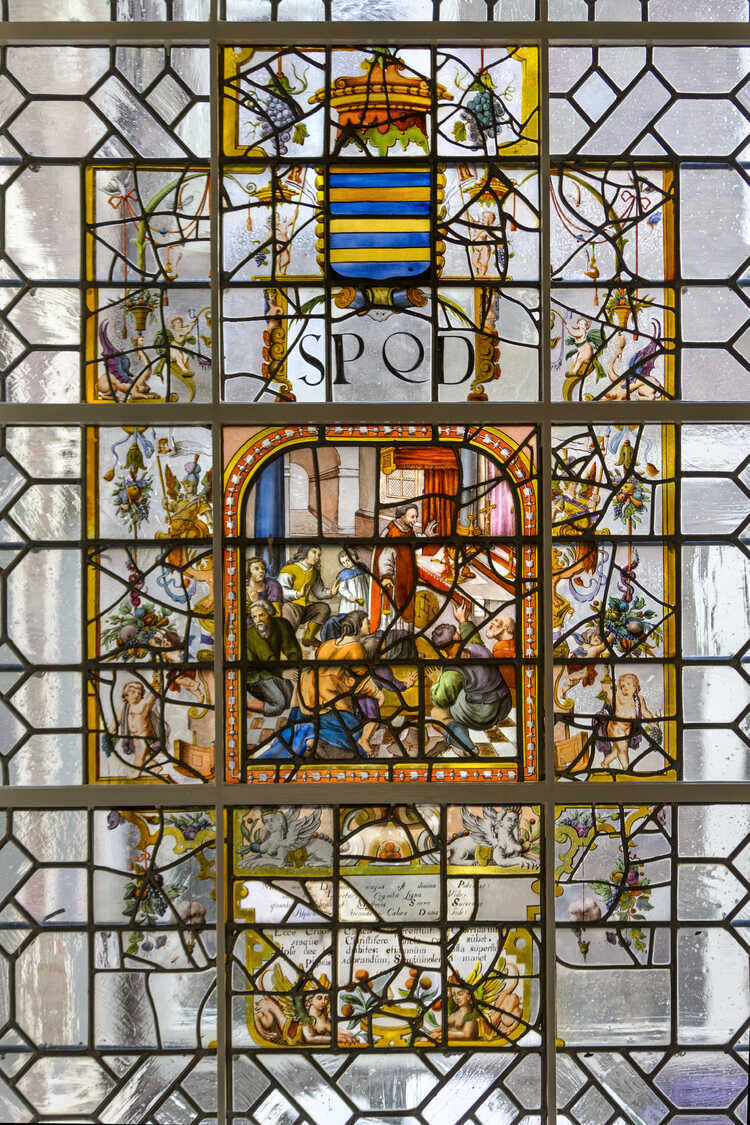
Blood miracle of Boxmeer, stained glass designed by van Diepenbeeck

His first wife died in 1648. On 13 May 1652 he married Anna van der Dort, with whom he had four children. Their daughter Johanna Marie van Diepenbeeck married the painter Joris van Bredael and their sons Jozef and Jan Pieter both became painters.

In the last half of his life, the artist busied himself nearly exclusively with designs for books and tapestries. He had various pupils. Between 18 September 1640 and 18 September 1641 he became the master of Franchoys Muntsaerts and between 18 September 1672 and 18 September 1673 of Jan Pauwels. Françoys van Uffelen was also his pupil.

Abraham van Diepenbeeck died in Antwerp on 31 December 1675.

== Work ==
He was mainly a designer of prints for books, stained-glass windows and tapestries. Only in the 1630s did he commence with monumental painting. He treated mythological and historical subjects, as well as portraits.

In Antwerp he achieved his first successes in painting on glass. He designed windows for the cathedral of Antwerp on the subject of the Acts of Mercy. He also designed the windows for Antwerp's Saint Paul's Church showing scenes of the Life of Saint Pau. The 18 stained glass windows in the Carmelite monastery in Boxmeer are attributed to van Diepenbeeck. The windows depict scenes from the history of the monastery and also from the Eucharist.

Among his prints are 49 of the 58 designs engraved by Cornelis Bloemaert and others for Michel de Marolles' Tableaux du Temple des Muses to illustrate de Marolles' adaptations of classical fables. Van Diepenbeeck designed all plates other than plates nos. 9, 10, 19, 32, 49, 47, 50, 52 and 53 which were designed by Pierre Brebiette.
