= Jan Peeter van Bredael the Elder =

Flemish painter

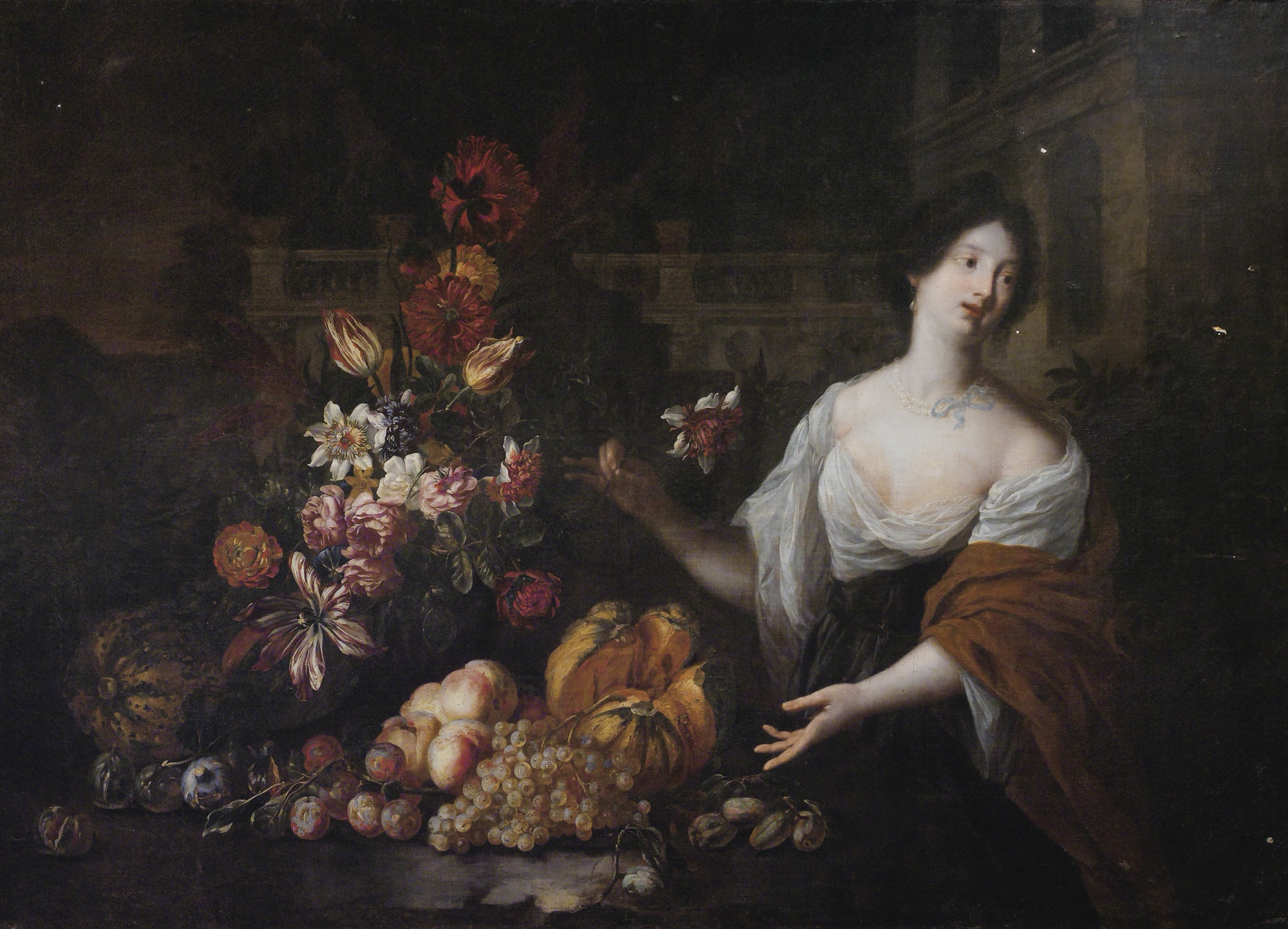
Still life of flowers in a park with a woman

Jan Peeter van Bredael the Elder or Jan Pieter van Bredael the Elder (Antwerp, 23 April 1654 – Antwerp, 10 March 1745) was a Flemish painter, art restorer and art dealer. He is known for his still lifes of flowers and fruits, game and Italianate landscapes. He was a member of the prominent artistic family van Bredael from Antwerp.

== Life ==
Jan Peeter van Bredael the Elder was born into an artist family in Antwerp as a son of the landscape painter Peeter van Bredael and Anna Maria Veldener. His father was known for his in market scenes and village feasts set in Italianate landscapes. His mother was the daughter of the sculptor Jennyn Veldener. His brothers Joris and Alexander also became painters.

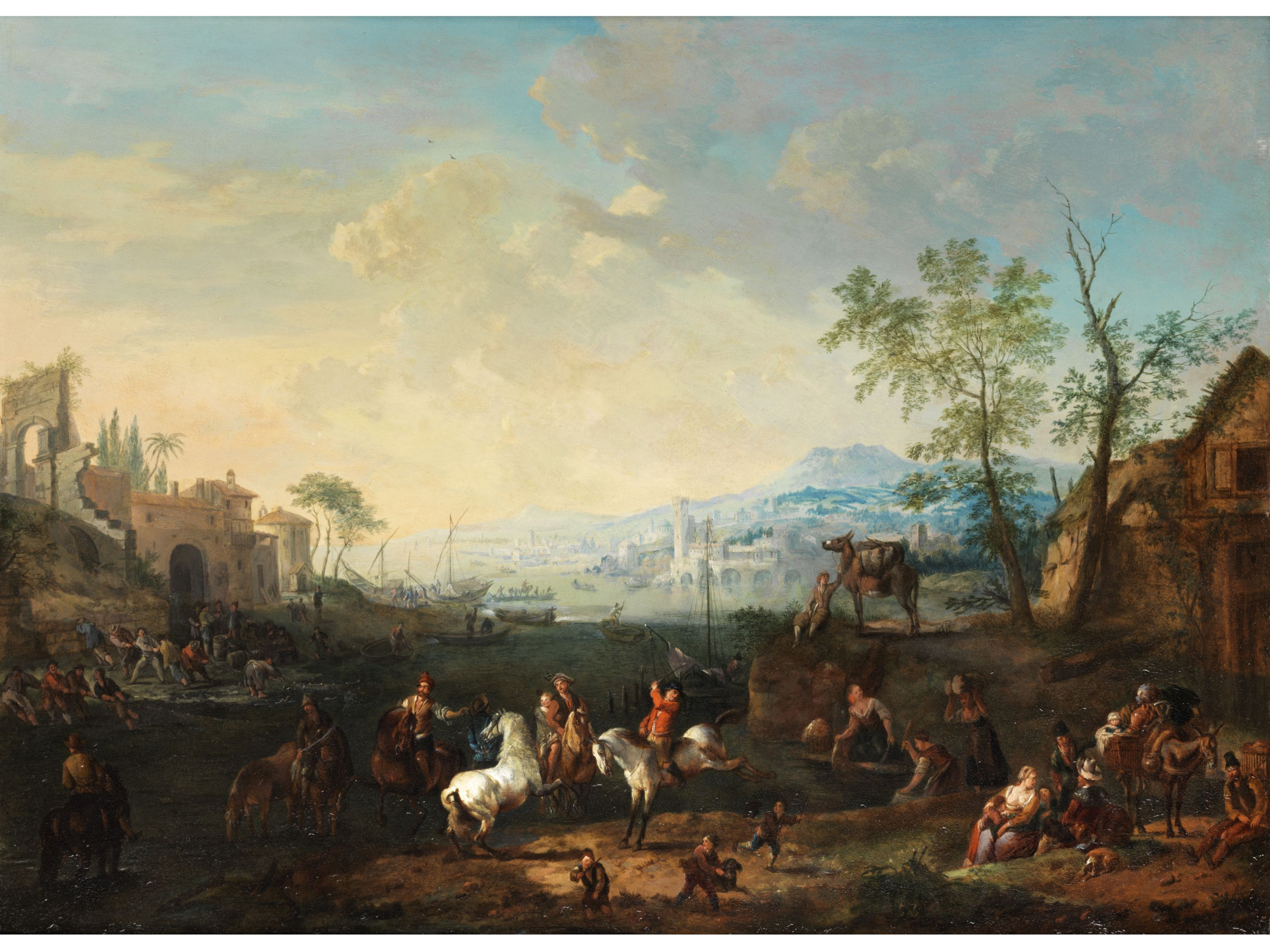
Mediterranean port scene with figures

His father was his first teacher. He left for Italy before 1680. Upon his return to Antwerp in 1680 he became a member of the Antwerp Guild of St Luke. He married on 11 January 1680 Joanna Pinseel. His first wife died in February 1687. He remarried the same year. He had seven daughters and four sons with his second wife Joanna Catharina Huybrechts. He travelled to London between 1685 and 1689. Here he was active as a painter, art dealer and art restorer.

Jan Gillis Ferdinandus van Raveschot was his pupil from 1694. He was successful and provided funds to the Guild of St Luke of Antwerp of which he became a dean In 1689. He was also active as an art restorer in Antwerp. In 1698 the Antwerp magistrate paid him for the restoration of some paintings. Between 1680 and 1729 he was a captain in the local civilian militia. He was financially successful and was able to purchase a house on the fashionable Meir in Antwerp. He moved to a hostel after his wife died in 1716.

He was recorded as an artist, art dealer and restorer in Paris in 1719.

He died on 10 March 1745 in Antwerp.

== Work ==
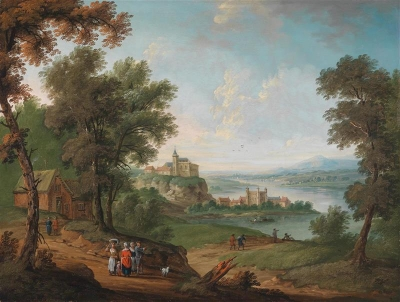
Vast river landscape with rural staffage

Jan Peeter van Bredael was a still life painter of flowers, fruit and game and also painted Italianate landscapes with figures. He signed with the initials JP intertwined. This monogram was often read as just 'P'. As a result, many of his works have been wrongly attributed to his father Peeter van Bredael.

His still lifes distinguish his work from that of his nephew Jan Peeter the Younger who painted hunting scenes and battles. A flower still life signed with his full first names is in the collection of the Museo de Artes Decorativas Palacio Taranco in Montevideo. Two flower and fruit still lifes are in the Kunsthalle Hamburg and a hunting still life in the Museum of Fine Arts of Lyon.
