= Simon Johannes van Douw =

Flemish painter and draughtsman

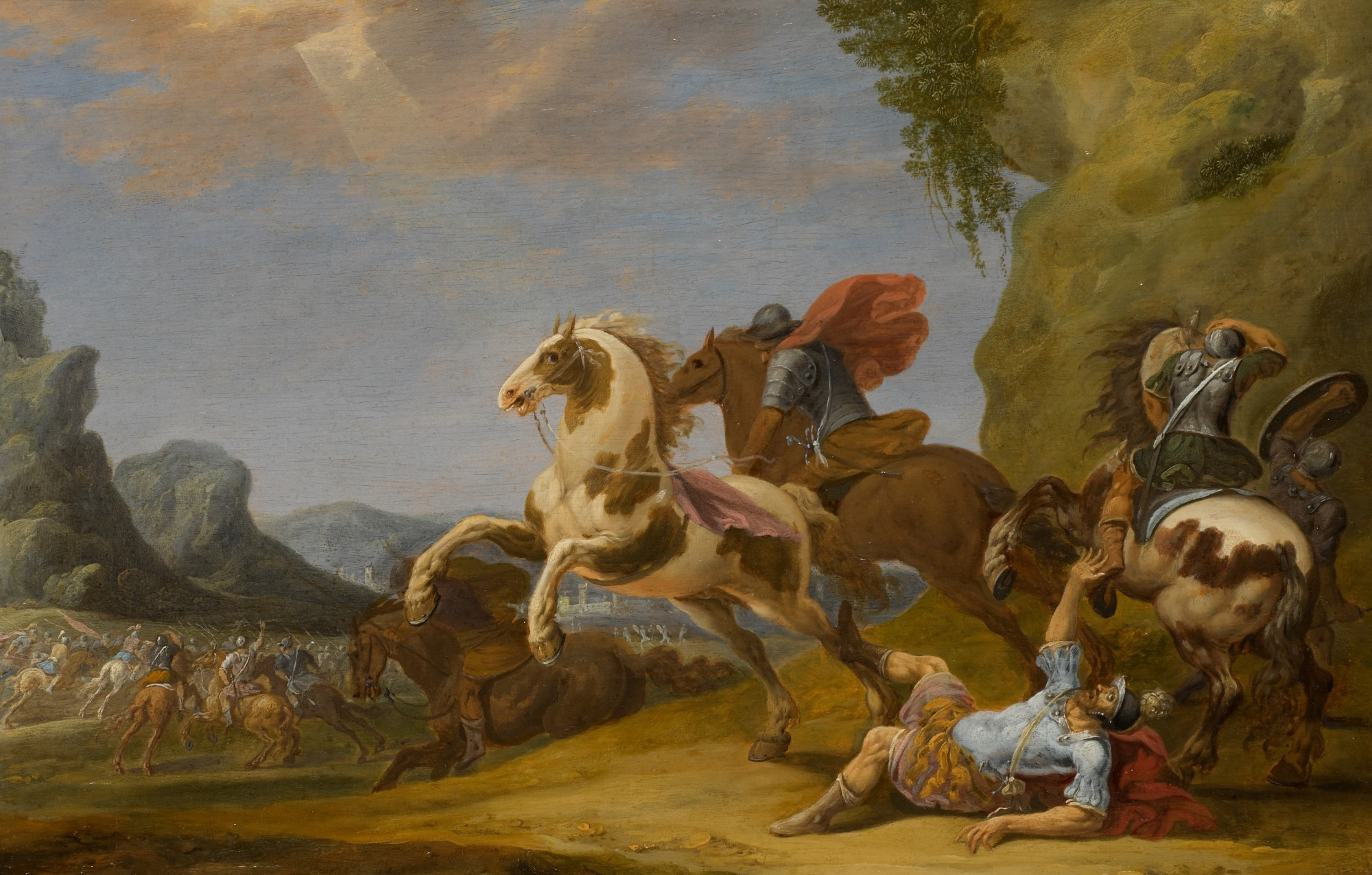
Fall of Saul

Simon Johannes van Douw (c. 1630 – after 1677 before 1697) was a Flemish painter and draughtsman. His work ranges from Italianizing landscapes, equestrian skirmishes and battles to cattle market and hunting scenes. He worked in Antwerp, Middelburg and Rotterdam.

== Life ==
There are no details about the place of birth of Simon Johannes van Douw. It is possible that he was born in Antwerp. It is not known with whom he trained. He became a master in the Antwerp Guild of Saint Luke in 1655. He married Johanna Soolmaeckers in 1656. It is not clear whether she was related to the landscape painter Jan Frans Soolmaker. From this year he also had pupils in Antwerp.

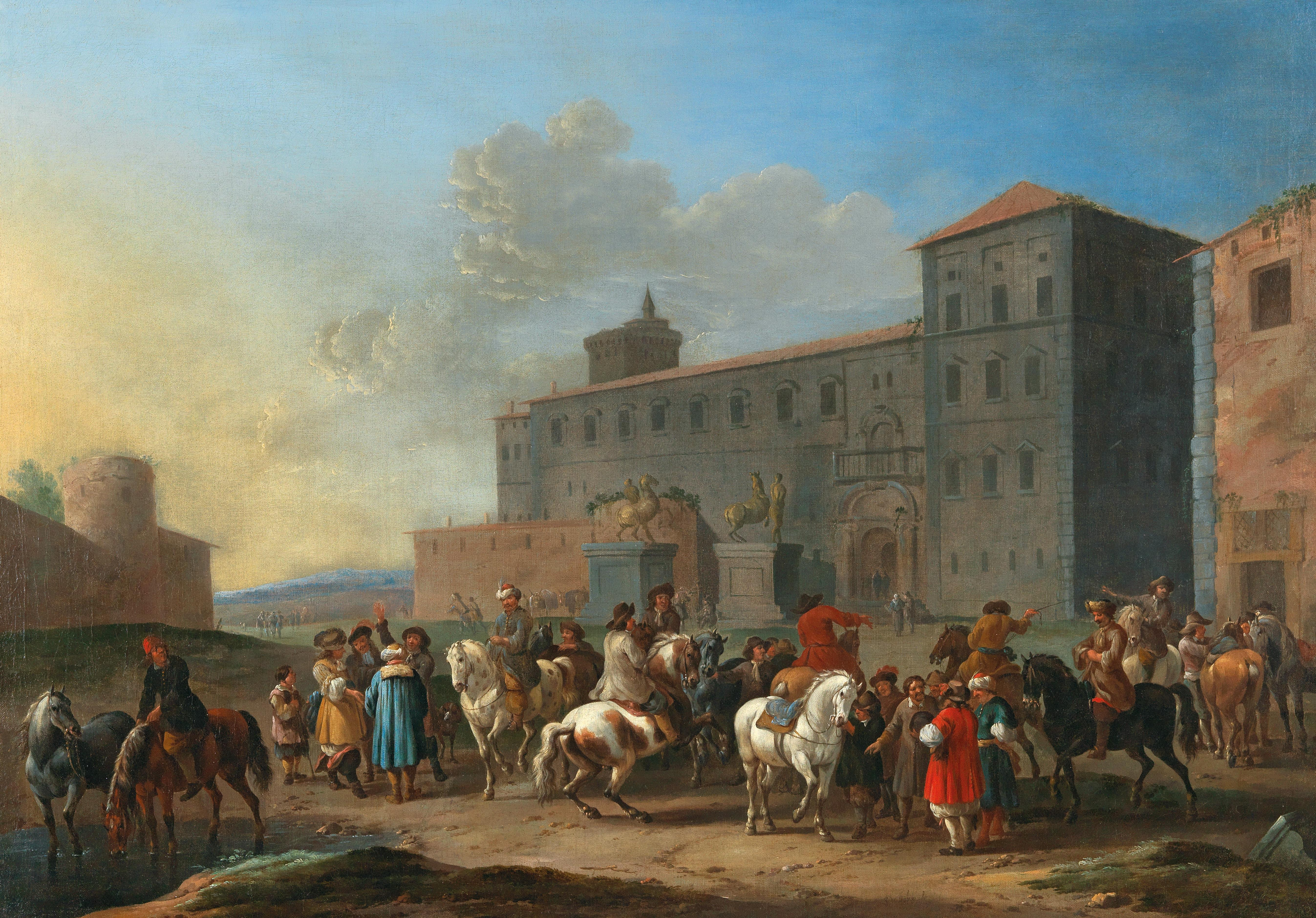
Horse market at the Piazza del Quirinale, Rome

On 1 November 1656 he became a member of the Guild of Saint Luke in Middelburg. He was active in Middelburg until September 1657. From 1659 he is recorded in Rotterdam. Here he was referred to as a 'burgher and painter' when he was involved in the sale of a house in 1666. He is documented in Rotterdam until 1677. From 1666 he is also recorded in Antwerp so he seems to have been active in Rotterdam and Antwerp at the same time. His last recorded work dates from 1677. It is not known when or where he died.

His pupils include Pieter van Bloemen and Carel Fonteyn. In 1664 he founded in Antwerp a school for the painting of battle scenes; Pieter van Bloemen, Frank Valk, and Pieter Verpoorten were involved in this school.

== Work ==
His known works date from 1654 to 1677. Initially he mainly painted cavalry skirmishes and battles. Later he changed to the subjects of horse and cattle market and hunting scenes. His early works are stylistically related to the cabinet painting tradition in Antwerp. This is noticeable in the stage-like setting of the action, the breaking down of the landscape through colour thresholds and the atmospheric palette. He later increasingly was influenced by Philips Wouwermans. Some of his works are also similar to those of the landscape painter Jan Frans Soolmaker with whom he may have been related through marriage.

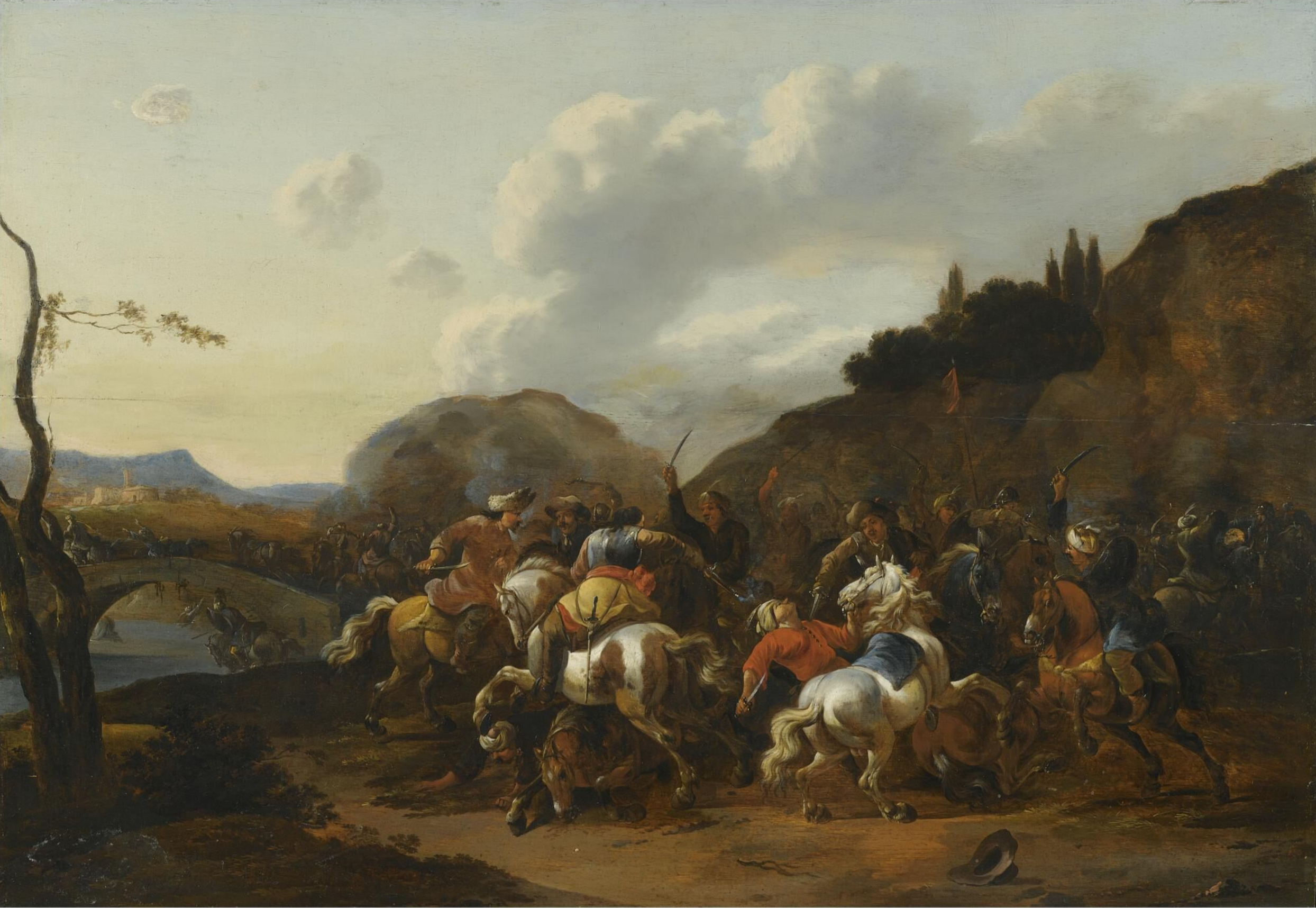
Battle skirmish between Christians and Turks

Van Douw was known for his accurate depictions of animals, especially horses. He often painted lively horses similar to Wouwermans. Although no evidence exists that he visited Italy, his imaginary landscapes are in the Italianate style and often depict classical ruins. They typically include a great number of figures engaged in a variety of activities. A good example is the Italianizing Capriccio with Market Scene showing a large number of people engaged in trade and in play, enjoying themselves in the tavern or herding their flock. The Italian influence is also evident in van Douw's human figures, which are often plump and round-faced, reminiscent of the genre painters in the circle of the Bamboccianti. A number of Flemish painters such as Anton Goubau and Pieter Casteels II were painting similar scenes.
