= Jan Pieter van Bredael the Younger =

Flemish painter (1683–1735)

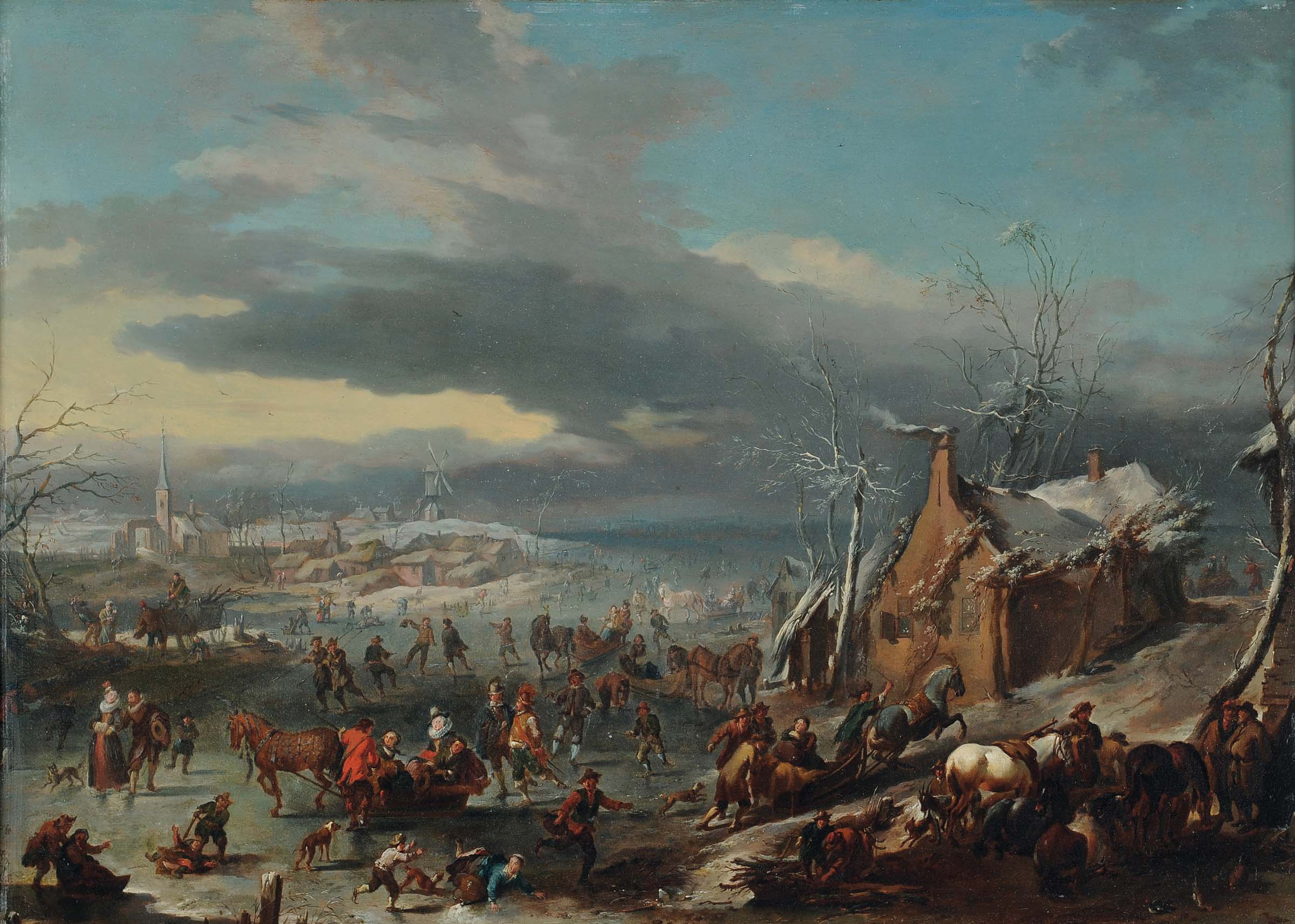
Winter

Jan Pieter van Bredael the Younger or Jan Peeter van Bredael the Younger (27 July 1683 – 1735) was a Flemish painter known for his cavalry battle scenes and landscapes with genre scenes of village festivals and fairs. Scion of an important family of artists from Antwerp, he became a court painter in Prague and Vienna.

== Life ==
Jan Pieter van Bredael was born into an artist family in Antwerp as the eldest son of Joris van Bredael and Johanna Maria van Diepenbeeck. His father, his grandfather Peeter van Bredael as well as his uncles Jan Frans van Bredael and Jan Peeter the Elder were all painters. His mother was the daughter of the prominent Baroque painter Abraham van Diepenbeeck. His brother Jozef had a successful career as a painter and copyist in Antwerp and Paris.

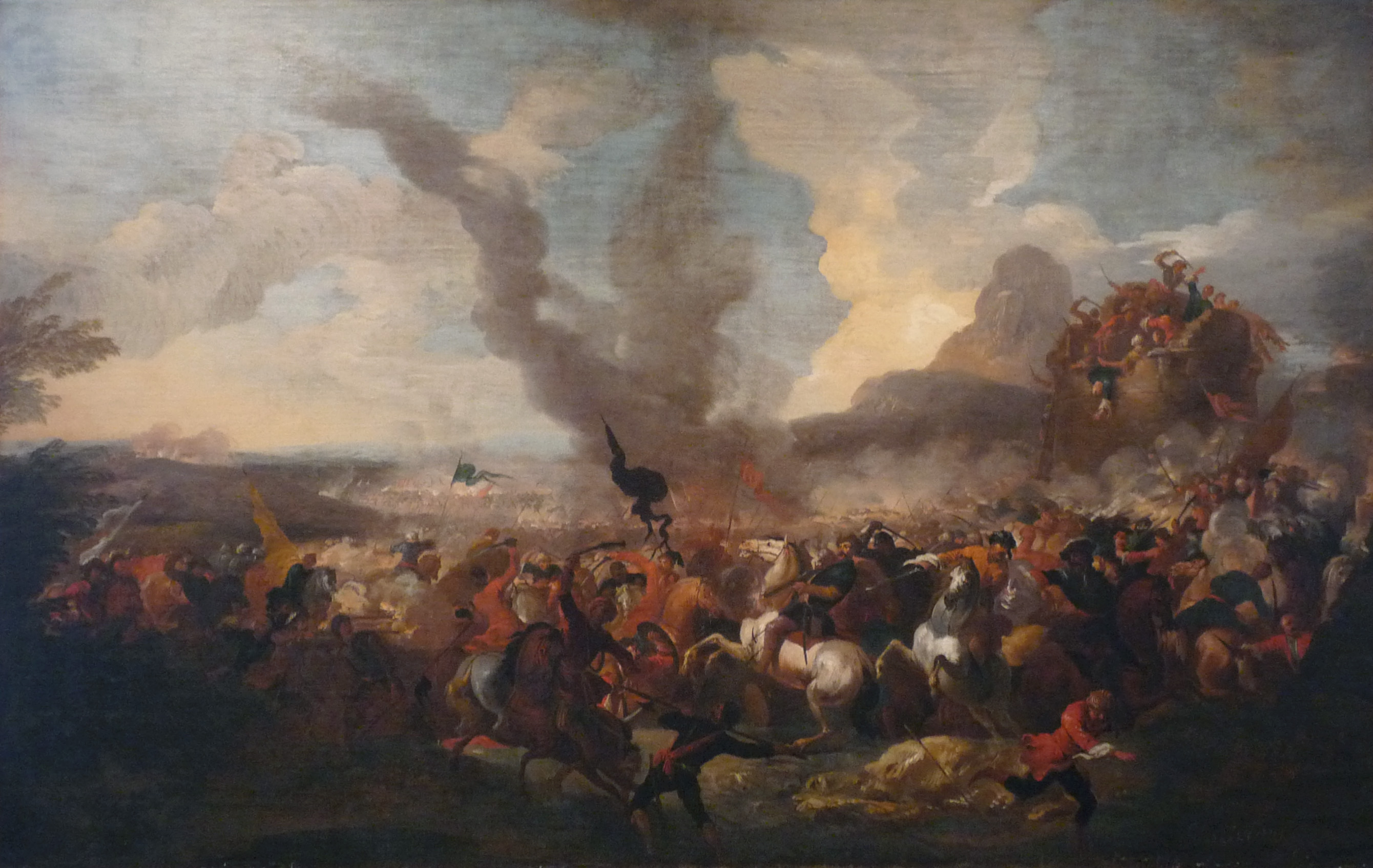
Battle victory against the Turks

Jan Pieter trained under his father. After the death of his father he left Antwerp in 1706 to live and work in Prague. He was employed for many years by Prince Eugene of Savoy, a very successful general and statesman of the Holy Roman Empire and the Austrian monarchy.

In 1720, the artist returned to his hometown Antwerp and joined the Guild of Saint Luke. Not long after his return Prince Eugene called him back to work for him in Vienna. Here he died unmarried in 1735. His brother Jozef appointed the Flemish painter Frans van Stampart, a court painter in Vienna, to act as the administrator of Jan Pieter's estate.

== Work ==
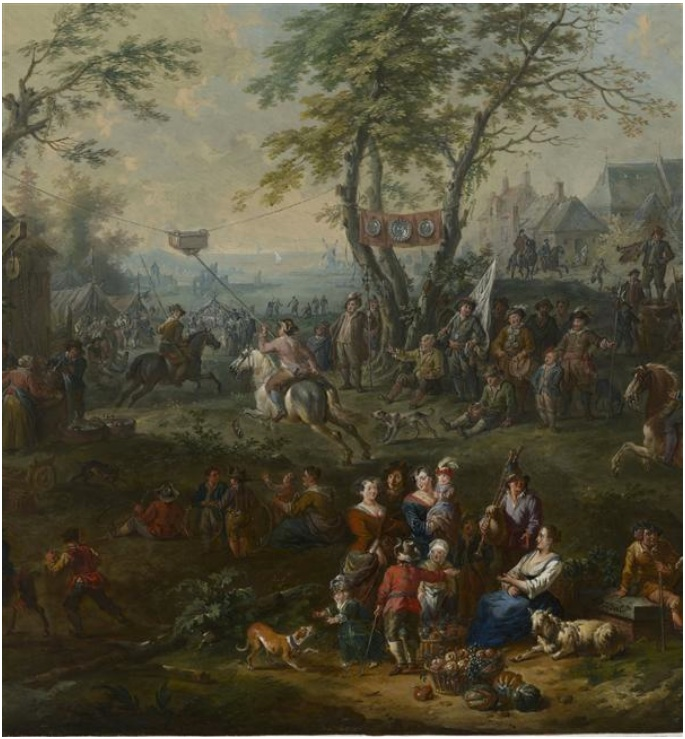
Village Feast

Like his father and brother, Jan Pieter van Bredael specialized in representations of cavalry encounters. In a time of increased conflict with the Ottoman Empire there was a significant demand for paintings depicting battles between Christian and Turkish forces. His patron Prince Eugene was an important general in the war against the Ottomans and commissioned from Jan Pieter several pictures on this subject as well as of hunting scenes.

As van Bredael also painted battle scenes from the Spanish War of Succession (1701–1714) in which Prince Eugene did not have a command, it can be assumed that Prince Eugene was not the only patron of the artist. Most of the cavalry compositions depict generic ambushes and skirmishes not specifically related to any particular battle. Jan Pieter's cavalry pieces are characterized by their lively palette and relatively loose brushwork.

Jan Pieter van Bredael also painted many landscapes with villages and popular revelries, games and celebrations. An example are the pair of compositions of Winter and Summer (Sold by Cambi on 13 March 2013, lot 258) depicting winter and summer activities in respectively a Flemish and an Italianate village.

He usually signed his paintings with the monogram 'J.P.van:Bredal'.
