= Johan Baptist Govaerts =

Flemish painter

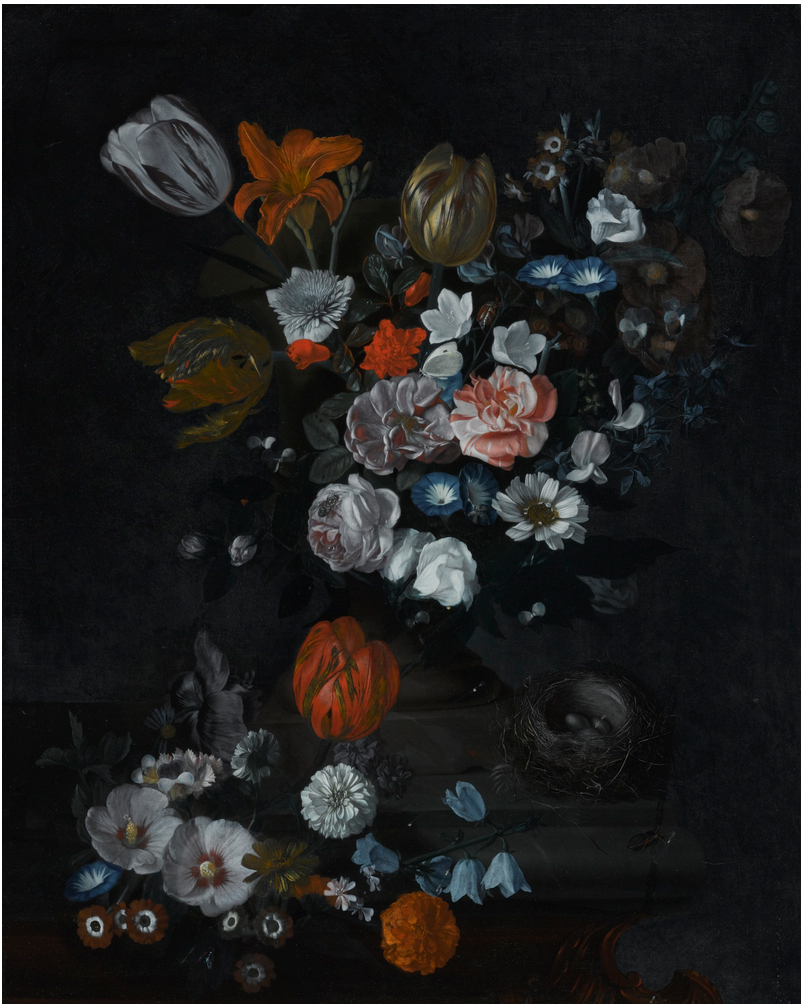
Still life of flowers and a bird's nest on a stone ledge

Johan Baptist Govaerts (c. 1701 – after 1745) was a Flemish painter known for his still lifes and genre paintings. After training and working in Antwerp he worked as a court painter in Mainz.

== Life ==
Little is recorded about Govaerts's life. He is believed to have been born around 1701 possibly in Antwerp. He is first recorded at the Guild of Saint Luke of Antwerp as a pupil of Alexander van Bredael in the guild year 1713/1714. His master Alexander van Bredael was a local painter known for his Italianate landscapes and genre scenes of fairs, cattle markets and villages.

Johan Baptist Govaerts was active in Antwerp until 1740. In 1740 the artist left Antwerp to move to Mainz where he was court painter to the Archbishop-Elector Philipp Karl von Eltz-Kempenich. In Mainz he painted kitchen scenes and game pieces.

He is believed to have remained in Mainz where he likely died in 1745 or 1746.

== Work ==
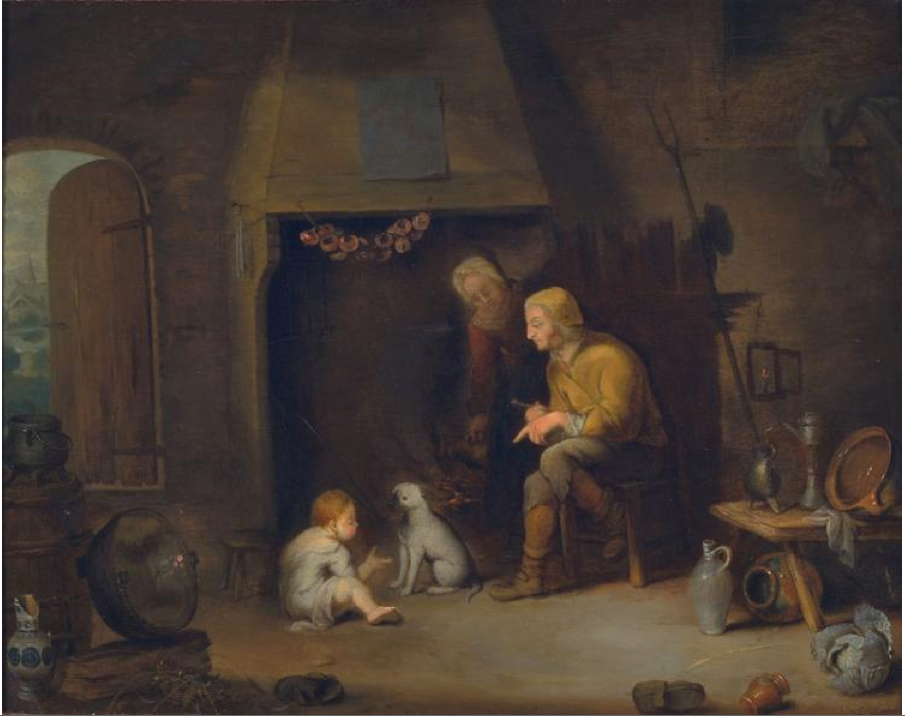
Farmer's family at the hearth

Johan Baptist Govaerts painted flower still lifes, genre scenes, history paintings, game pieces, fruit still lifes and mythological scenes.

Four genre scenes and a portrait of a hermit by the artist are in the collection of the Alte Pinakothek in Munich.
