= Carel Fonteyn =

Flemish painter

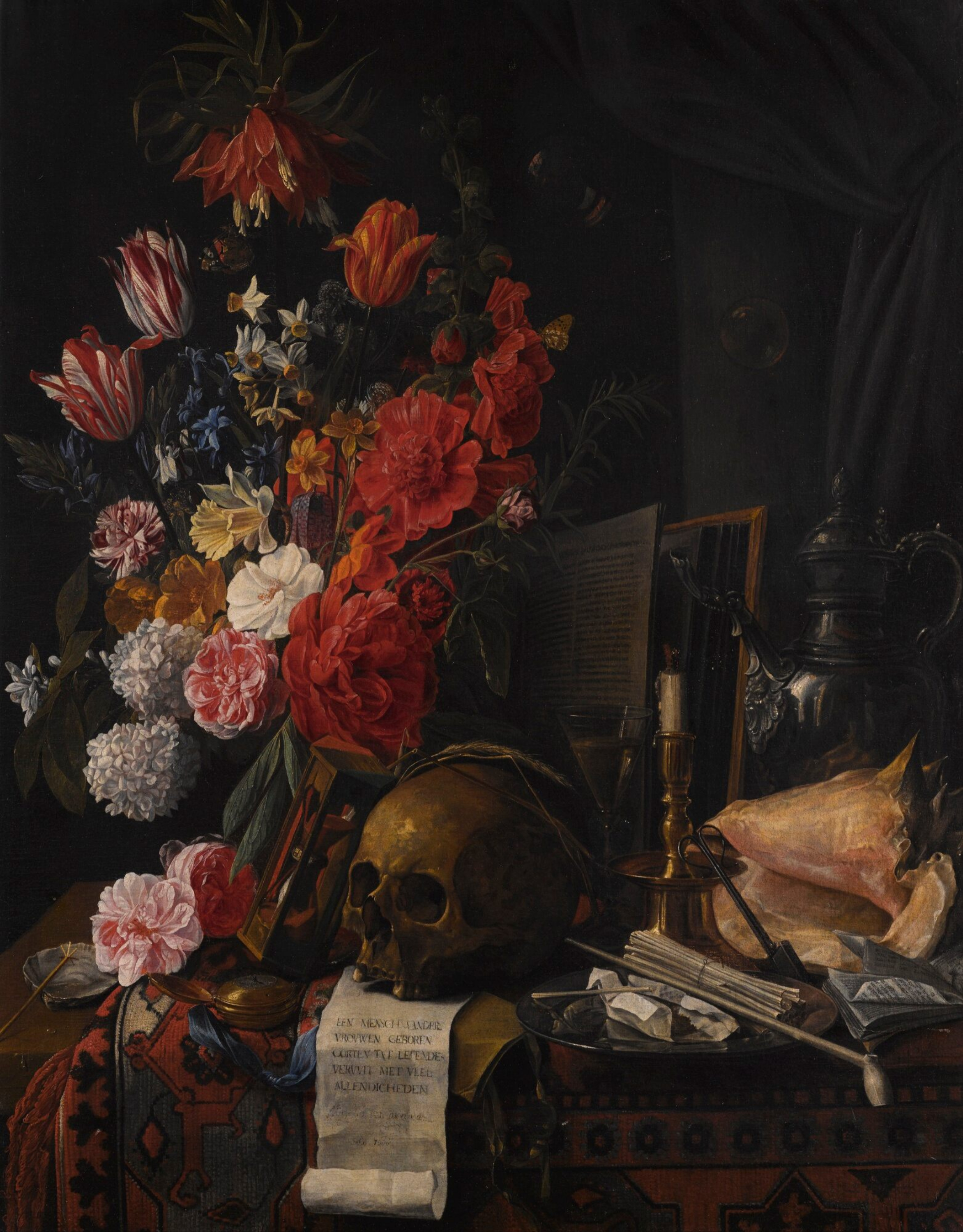
Vanitas still life with flowers, a skull, hourglass, conch shell and silver jug on a partially draped table

Carel Fonteyn or Carel Fontyn (fl Antwerp, 1655–1665) was a Flemish painter active in Antwerp. He is known for his Vanitas still lifes with flowers, skulls and other Vanitas symbols.

== Life ==
Details about the life of Carel Fonteyn are scarce. He was likely born in Antwerp around 1640. He was registered as a pupil at the Antwerp Guild of Saint Luke in the Guild year 1656–57. His master was the painter of hunting and battle scenes Simon Johannes van Douw. He became a master in the Guild in the Guild year 1664/65. No further details about his life are known.

== Work ==
The works of Fonteyn are very rare. Only one signed and dated work is known, the Vanitas still life with flowers, a skull, shell, pipe, book, globe, flute, stringed instrument and musical score, which is signed and dated 1665 and was last recorded with art dealer François Heim in Paris in 1964. A signed but undated work is the Vanitas still life with skull, playing cards, candle and flowers (Sold at Stockholms Stads Auktionsverk in Stockholm on 8 December 2010 as lot 118). Other works have been attributed to the artist based on their similarity with the signed works.

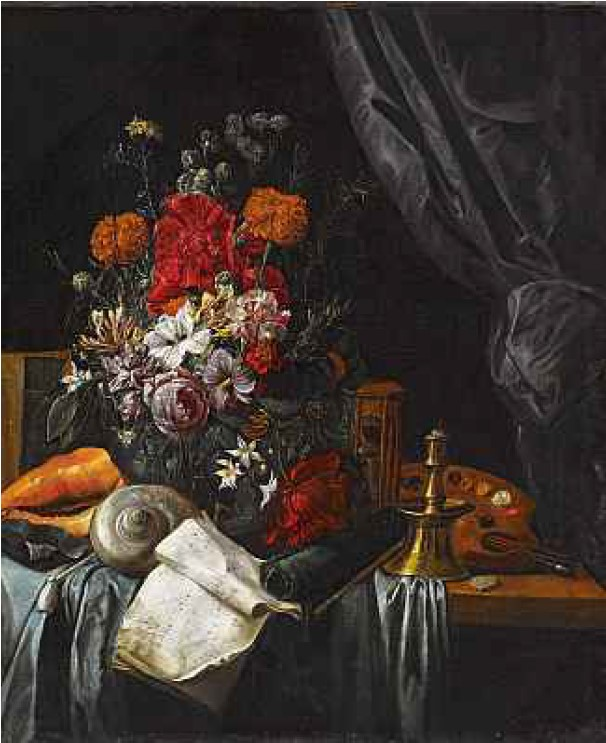
Vanitas still life with flowers, a skull, hourglass, conch shell, a palette and brushes

Fonteyn painted flower pieces and vanitas still lifes. Even his flower pieces contain a Vanitas motif. Vanitas still lifes were very popular in Flanders and the Dutch Republic during the 17th century. These still lifes include various objects which evoke the transitory nature of humanity's earthly aspirations and undertakings, the role of chance in life and life's apparent lack of meaning and purpose. These philosophical notions are expressed through stock symbols such as skulls, empty wine glasses, extinguished candles, empty shells, wilted flowers, dead animals, smoking utensils, clocks, mirrors, books, dice, playing cards, hourglasses, musical mucical instruments and scores, painter's tools, various expensive or exclusive objects such as jewelry.and rare shells. The term vanitas is derived from the famous line Vanitas, Vanitas. Et omnia Vanitas in the Vulgate translation of the book of Ecclesiastes in the Bible. In the King James Version this line is translated as "Vanity of vanities, all is vanity".

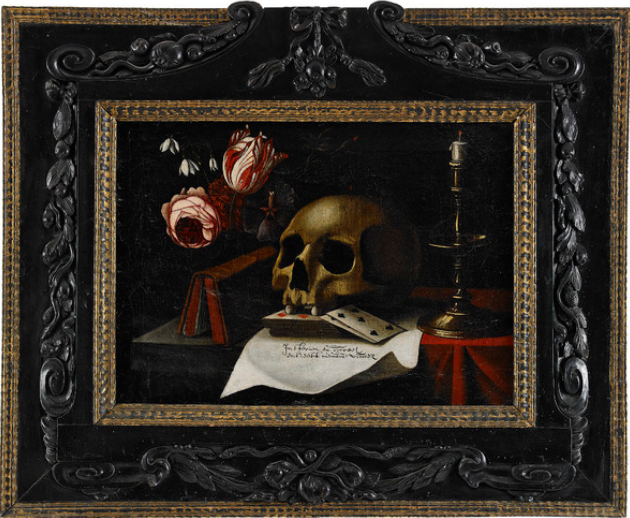
Vanitas still life with skull, playing cards, candle and flowers

Vanitas paintings are informed by a Christian understanding of the world as a temporary place of ephemeral pleasures and torments from which humanity's only hope of escape is through the sacrifice and resurrection of Christ. While most of the symbols in Vanitas still lifes reference earthly accomplishments (books, scientific instruments, etc.), pleasures (a pipe), sorrows (symbolised by a peeled lemon), the transience of life and death (skulls, soap bubbles, empty shells) and the role of chance in life (dice and playing cards), some symbols used in these paintings carry a dual meaning: a rose or an oar of grain refers as much to the brevity of life as it is a symbol of the resurrection of Christ and thus eternal life.

An example of a vanitas still life by Fonteyn is the Vanitas still life with flowers, a skull, hourglass, conch shell and silver jug on a partially draped table (signed and indistinctly dated lower centre on the parchment: Nicolaes van verendael / anno 1680, sold at Sotheby's on 7–10 December 2016 in London lot 20 as by Nicolaes van Verendael and sold at Sotheby's on 6 July 2017 in London lot 118 as attributed to Carel Fonteyn). The work contains the token vanitas symbols such as a skull, an hourglass, watch, an extinguished candle, a pipe and pipe cleaner, wilted flowers and crumpled up books. The text on the parchment reads as follows: Een mensch vander vrouwen geboren corten tyt levende vervult met veel allendichheden (Man is born from a woman and lives for a short time a life full of misery). The Vanitas still life with skull, playing cards, candle and flowers (signed on lower left: C L. Fonteyn, f, sold at Stockholms Stads Auktionsverk on 8 December 2010 in Stockholm lot 118) is a much starker picture that is made up of only a few of the typical Vanitas symbols which are shown in close-up and cramped together in the canvas.
