= Joseph van Bredael =

Flemish painter (1688–1739)

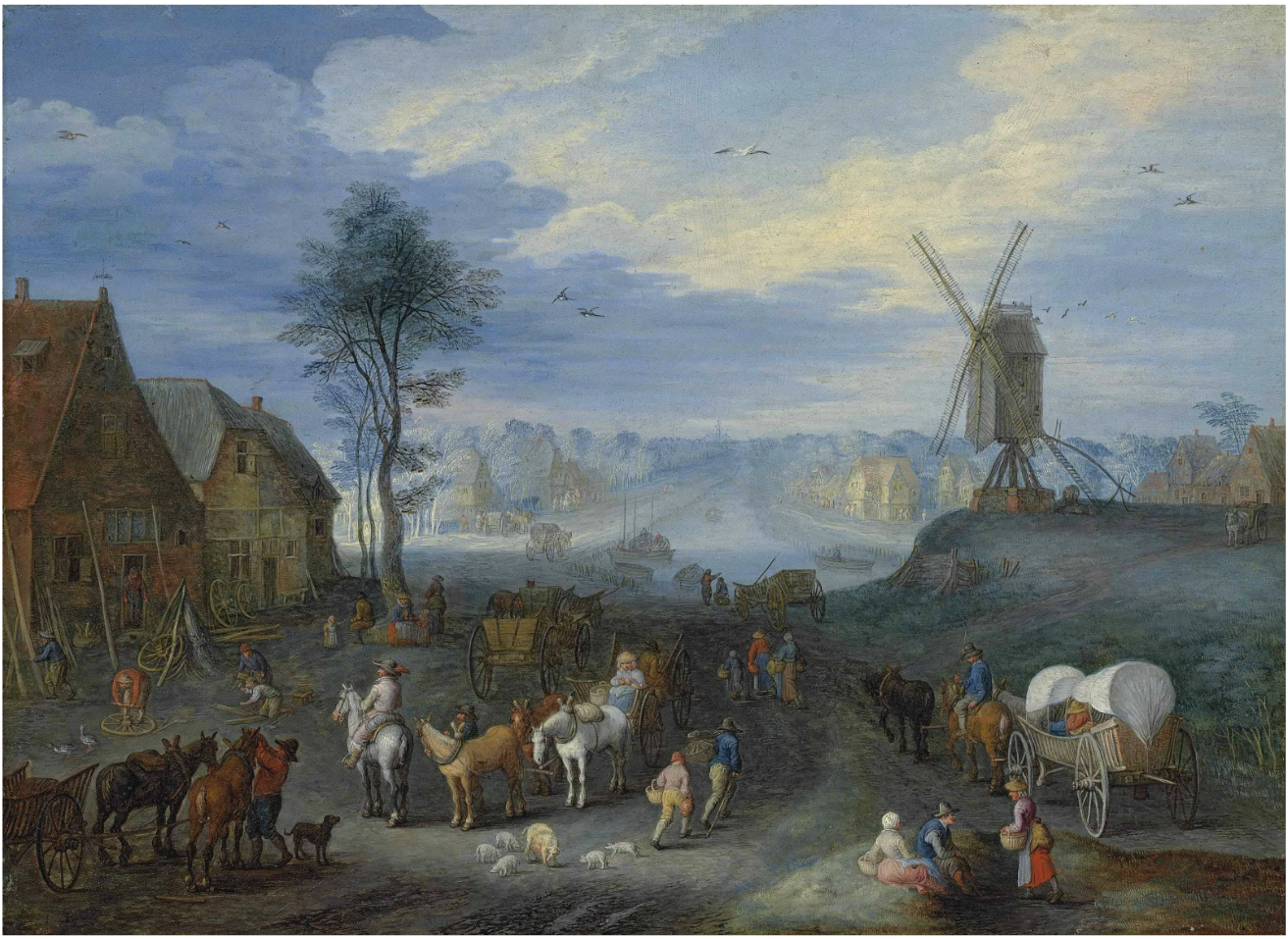
Village with a windmill

Jozef van Bredael, Joseph van Bredael, or Josef van Bredael (14 August 1688 – 2 April 1739) was a Flemish painter known for Italianate landscapes and genre scenes of fairs, cattle markets and villages. He worked in his final years in France.

== Life ==
Jozef van Bredael was born into an artist family in Antwerp as the second son of Joris van Bredael and Johanna Maria van Diepenbeeck. His father as well as his grandfather Peeter van Bredael were painters. His uncles Jan Frans van Bredael and Jan Peeter van Bredael the Elder were also painters. His mother was the daughter of the prominent Baroque painter Abraham van Diepenbeeck. His brother Jan Peeter was also a painter who had a successful career in Vienna. Jozef trained under his father.

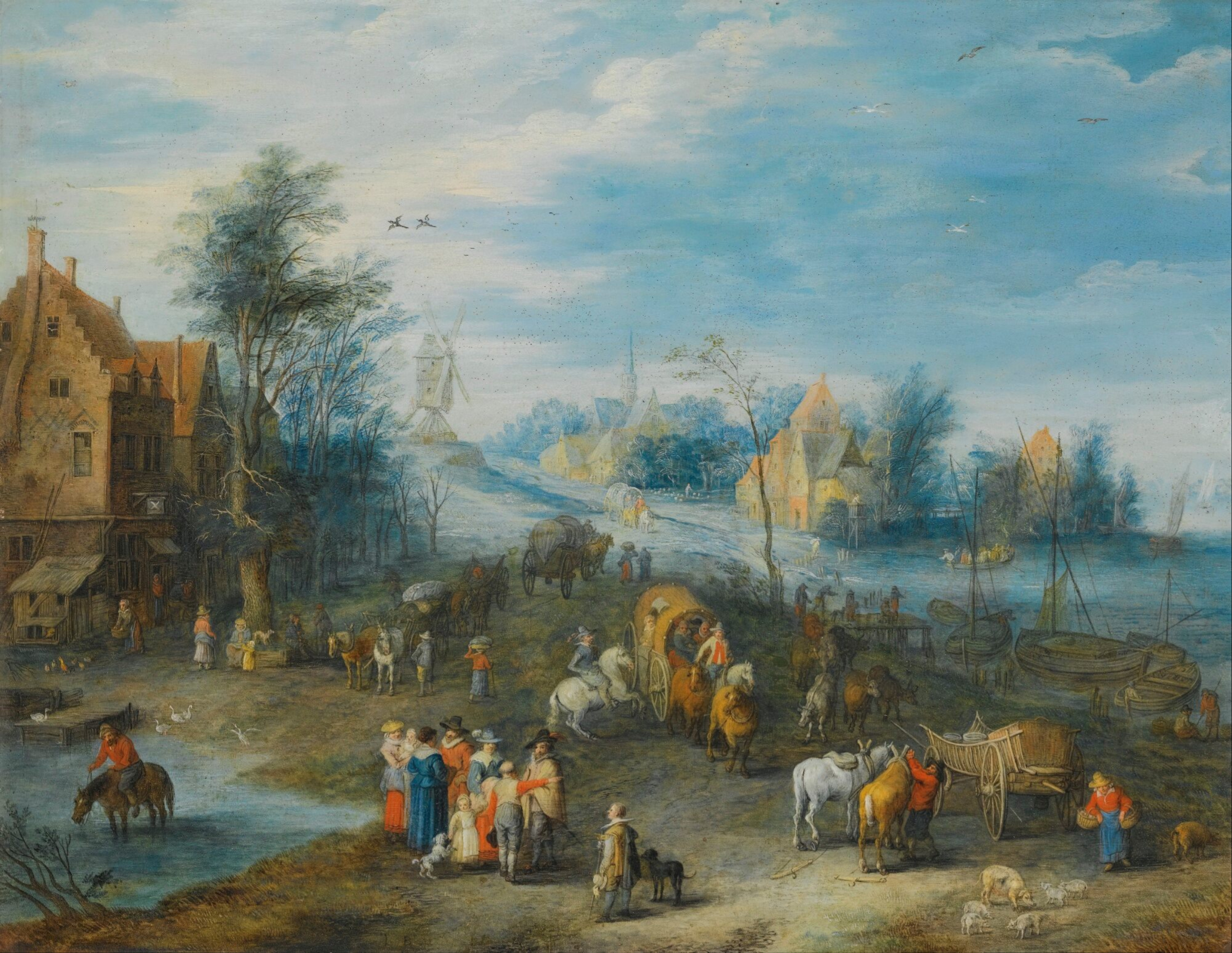
Village on the banks of a river

In 1706 Jozef van Bredael and his cousin Jan Frans entered into a contract with the Antwerp art dealer Jacob de Witte to produce copies after the paintings of Philips Wouwerman and Jan Brueghel the Elder for a number of years. Under the contract, Jozef was to receive for each copy he produced 6 guilders in the first year, 8 guilders in the second and 10 guilders in the third and fourth years plus a bonus of 1 shilling. At the end of the contract he would also get a blue coat. Jan Frans was paid a marginally higher fee as he was more experienced than his 18-year cousin but Jan Frans was also bound by an exclusivity obligation to work only for Jacob de Witte. Since they did not sign the copies, it is not possible to distinguish who was responsible for individual copies. It is possible that the not so scrupulous art dealer de Witte even sold these copies as originals since the copies were such good imitations of the style of the original artists. Jozef was originally contracted to work for de Witte for a period of four years but he may have worked for him for a longer period.

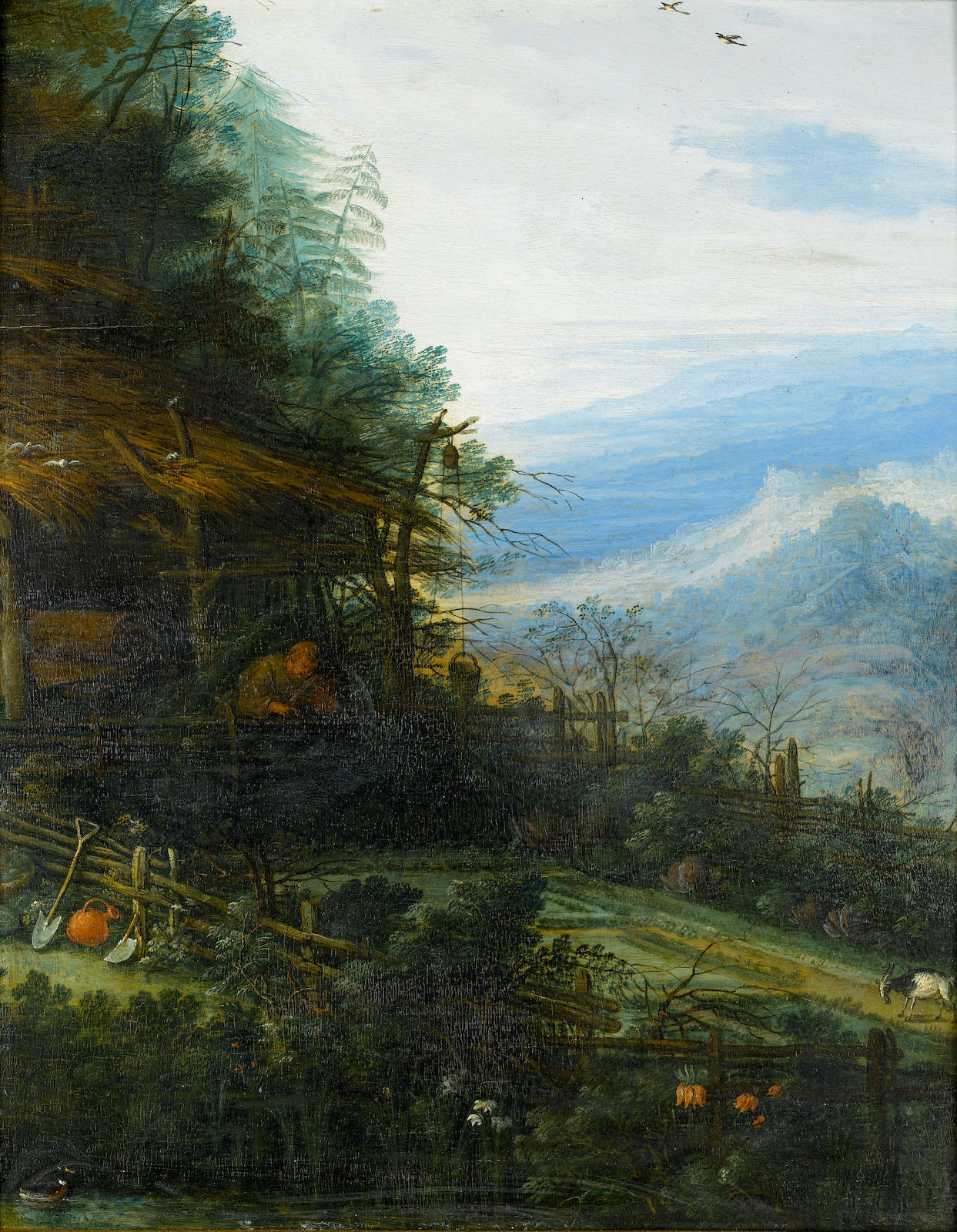
Mountainous landscape with a figure reading before a cottage

It is not clear when he moved to France. There is mention of him going to France to work in 1725. Here he worked as a copyist and made several copies after Claude Lorrain for Jean-François Leriget de La Faye, an important French art collector. Other historians state that Jozef only moved to France in 1735 or 1736 after he had completed the paperwork related to the inheritance of his brother Jan Peeter who had died in Vienna. He had appointed the Flemish painter Frans van Stampart, a court painter in Vienna, to act as the administrator of his brother's estate. In France he became a member of the Royal Academy of the court of Louis d'Orléans, Duke of Orléans.

He never married and likely died in Paris in 1739 - the thought of being in France bringing forward his untimely death.

== Work ==
Joseph Bredael painted mostly landscapes and battles and made both copies and pastiches of compositions of 17th-century painters who were still popular in the 18th century such as Jan Brueghel the Elder, Philips Wouwerman and Claude.

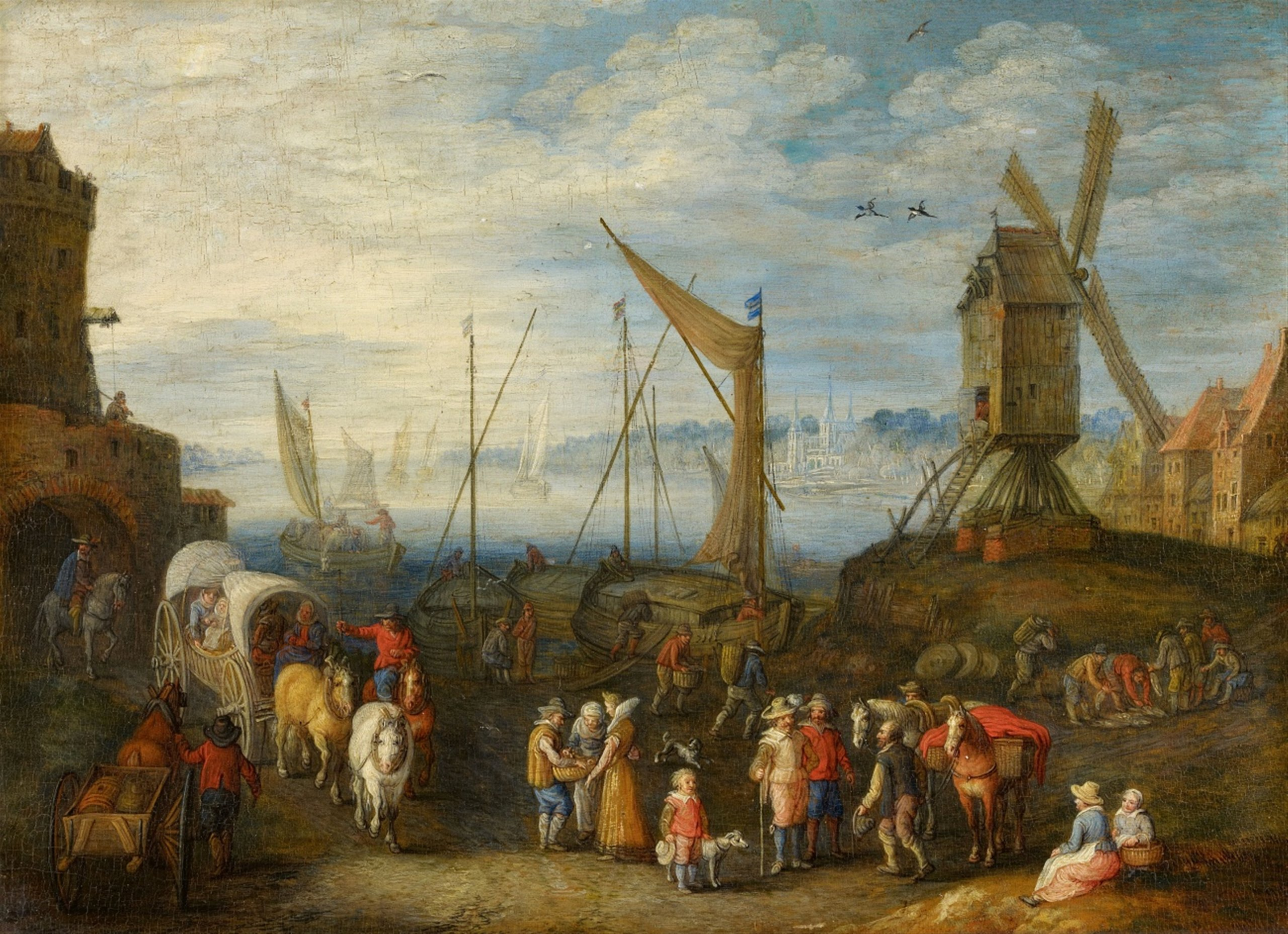
Harbour scene with a windmill

As he signed his paintings with the monogram JB, like Jan Brueghel, there have been a number of erroneous attributions of his work to Jan Breughel the Elder. Jozef van Bredael had copied many Brueghelian compositions and was thus inspired by their style. He interpreted the Brueghelian idiom through the aesthetics of his day and added a personal note to the contours of his figures and his strokes. Van Bredael's quality of execution and delicate naturalism placed him amongst the best followers and imitators of Jan Brueghel the Elder, alongside Peeter Gijsels, Théobald Michau and Mathys Schoevaerdts.

He paid particular attention to detail, meticulously executing his figures and décor in the style of a miniaturist. He was able to create the illusion of a succession of planes in his compositions through the use of lateral screens and a subtle and nuanced palette, which tended towards tones of dominant blues and browns, though always gentle and subtle.

He executed his successful compositions in many, almost identical versions as is shown by the two versions of a Village with a windmill, one of which sold by Christie's on 4 July 2012 in London, lot 148 and the other of which was sold by De Jonckheere Master paintings.
