= Peeter van Bredael =

Flemish painter (1629–1719)

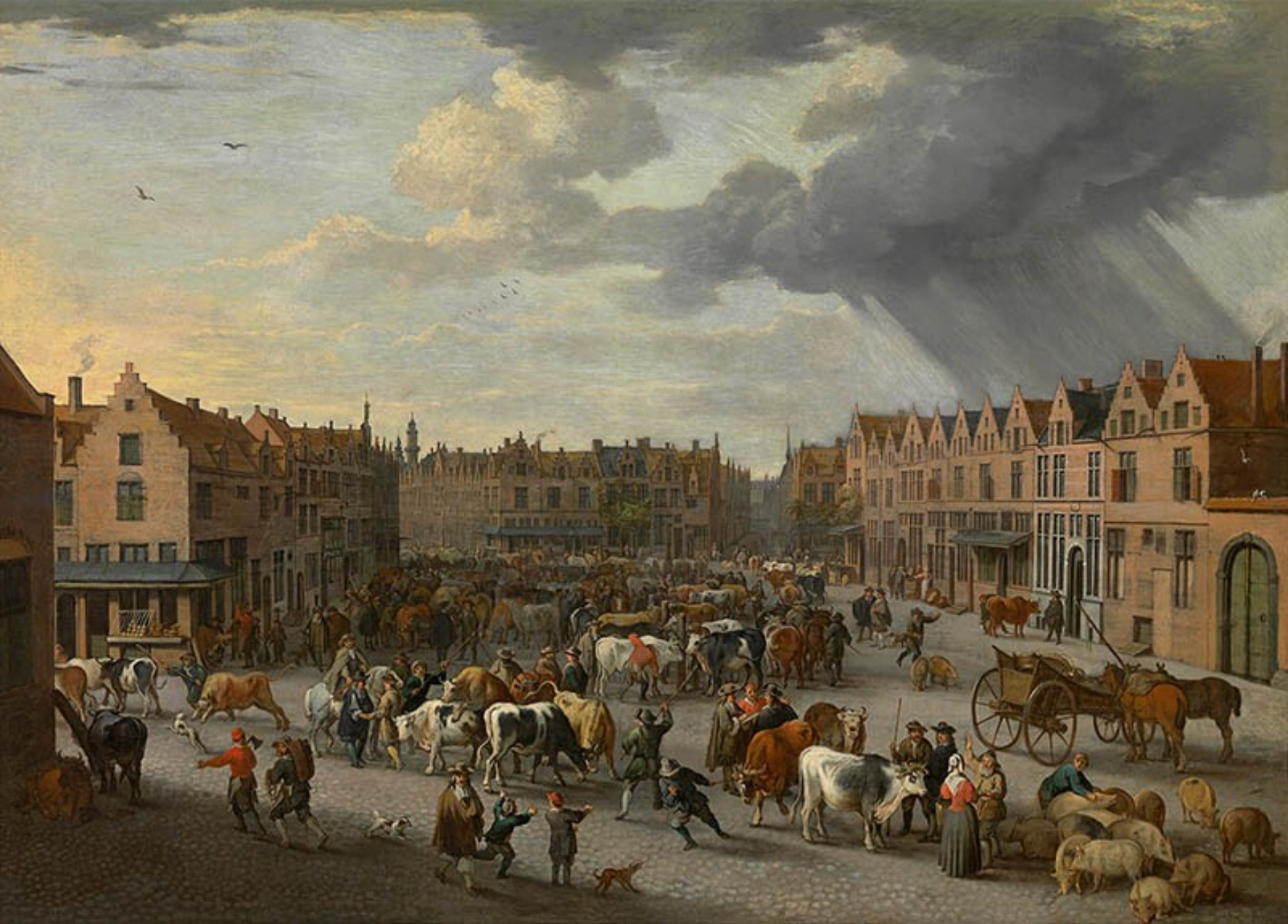
The Old Ox Market in Antwerp

Pieter van Bredael or Peeter van Bredael (baptised 19 July 1629 – 9 March 1719) was a Flemish painter specializing in market scenes and village feasts set in Italianate landscapes or contemporary, usually, urban environments.

== Biography ==
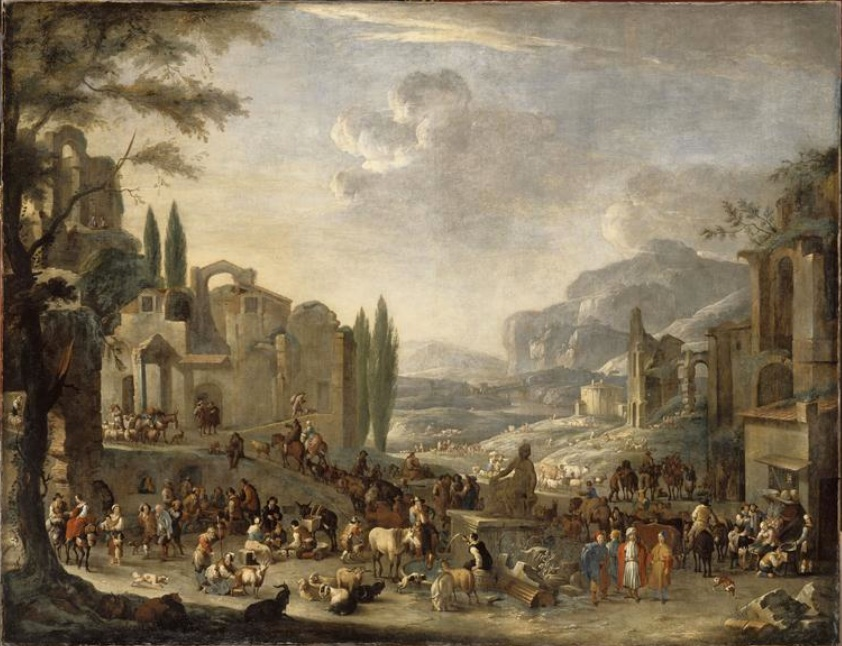
Market in Italy amid Fantastic Ruins

Pieter van Bredael was born in Antwerp in 1629, and was baptised on 19 July 1629 as the son of Peter and Maria Pais. He reportedly joined the workshop of David Ryckaert III on 20 January 1640 and studied there for four years. He undertook several travels abroad. It is known he travelled to Spain. Although there is no evidence for a stay in Italy, the inclusion in his landscapes of ruins of architecture from the environs of Rome points to a possible visit to Italy.

Upon his return to Antwerp in 1648 he married Anna Maria Veldener, the daughter of the prominent sculptor Jenijn Veldener. The couple had eight children of whom three, Jan Peeter, Alexander and Joris became painters. Several of his grandchildren such as Joseph van Bredael, Jan Pieter van Bredael the Younger and Jan Frans van Bredael were also painters.

Van Bredael likely did not start working for his own account until 1651, the year in which he became a master of the Antwerp Guild of Saint Luke. He also joined a schutterij, a local civil militia, and obtained the rank of captain.

His pupils included his sons Jan Peeter, Joris and Alexander, Hendrik Frans van Lint and Ferdinandus Hofmans.

He died in Antwerp where he was buried on 9 March 1719.

== Work ==
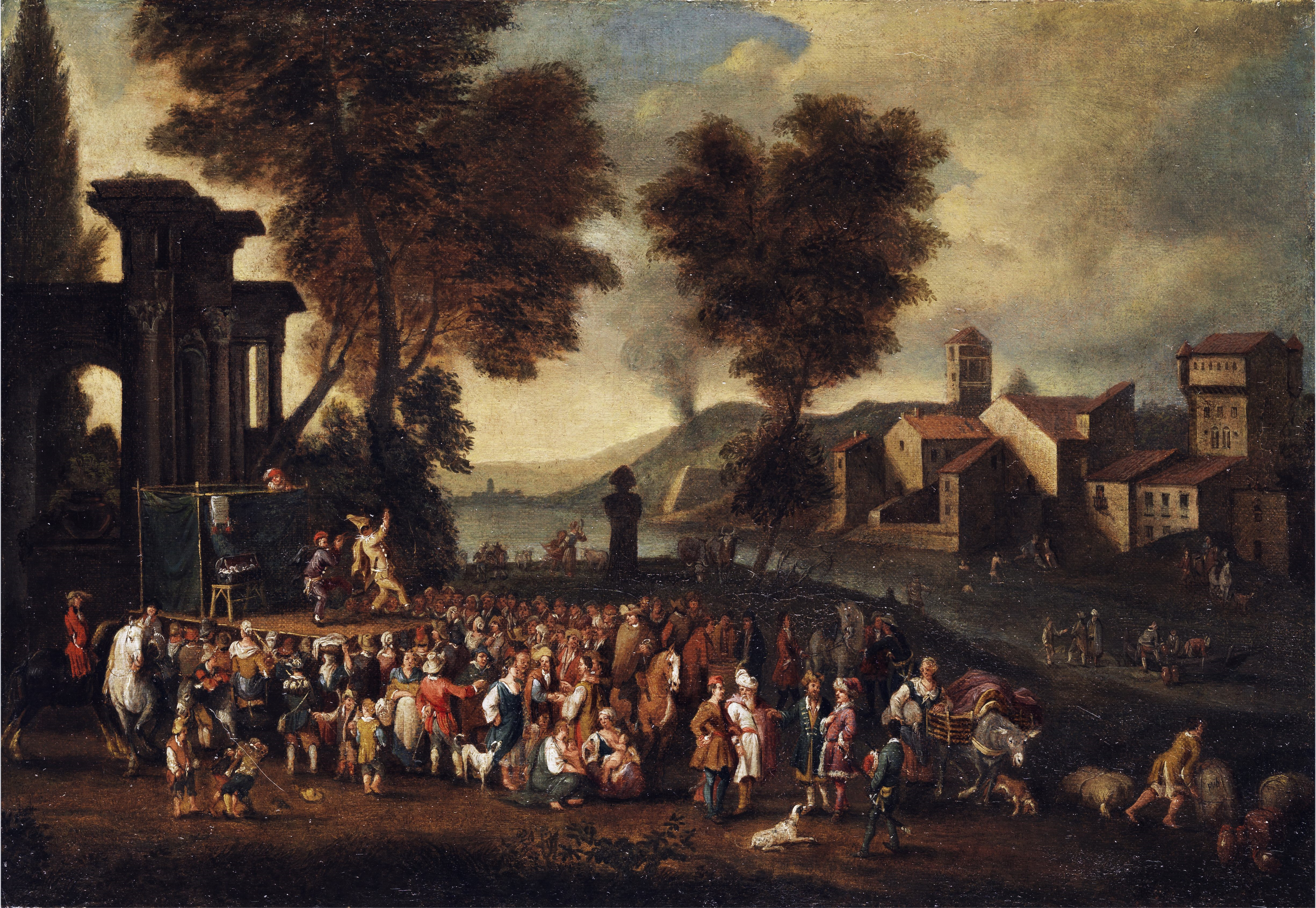
Commedia dell’arte scene

Pieter van Bredael is mainly known for his scenes of Roman cattle markets amidst a landscape of buildings, often ruins from Antiquity, Italian pastoral landscapes and less often battle pieces. He also depicted genre scenes such as village festivals, processions and a commedia dell’arte scene. Van Bredael's very imaginative market scenes succeeded in illustrating various aspects of everyday town life. Van Bredael was often influenced by Italian architectural forms.

He worked as a copyist and is known to have copied battle scenes of the Dutch painter Philips Wouwerman. A drawing of an Equestrian Battle in the Mauritshuis has been attributed to van Bredael as being a copy after Wouwerman.
