= Alexander van Bredael =

Flemish painter (1663–1720)

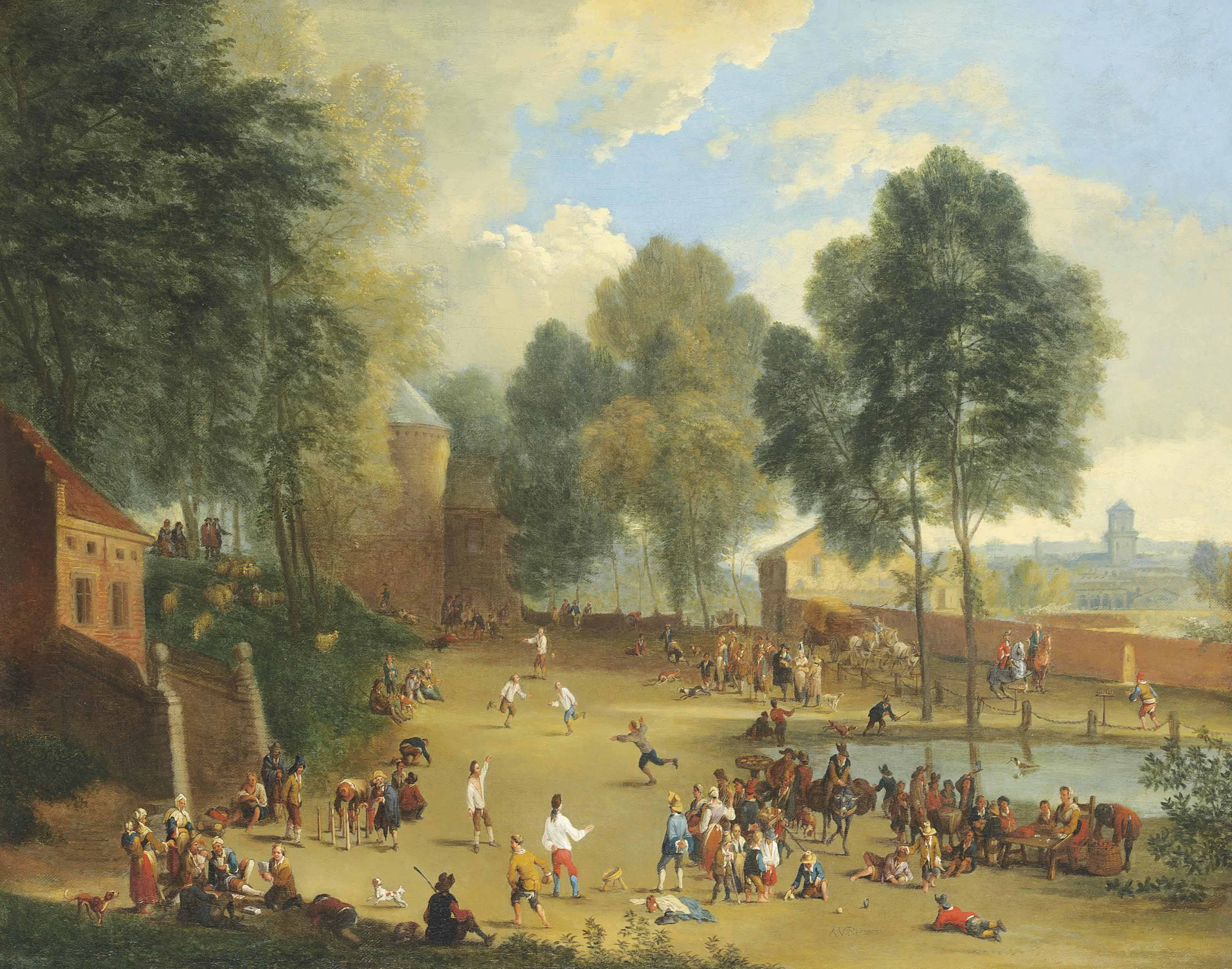
Village landscape with figures playing ball games

Alexander van Bredael (1 April 1663 – 14 July 1720) was a Flemish painter known for Italianate landscapes and genre scenes of fairs, cattle markets and villages. He was a prominent member of the Antwerp artistic family van Bredael.

== Life ==
He was born in Antwerp into an artist family as the son of Peeter van Bredael, a well-known painter specializing in market scenes and village feasts set in Italianate landscapes. His mother was Anna Maria Veldener, the daughter of the prominent sculptor Jenijn Veldener. Two of his brothers, Jan Peeter the Elder and Joris became painters.

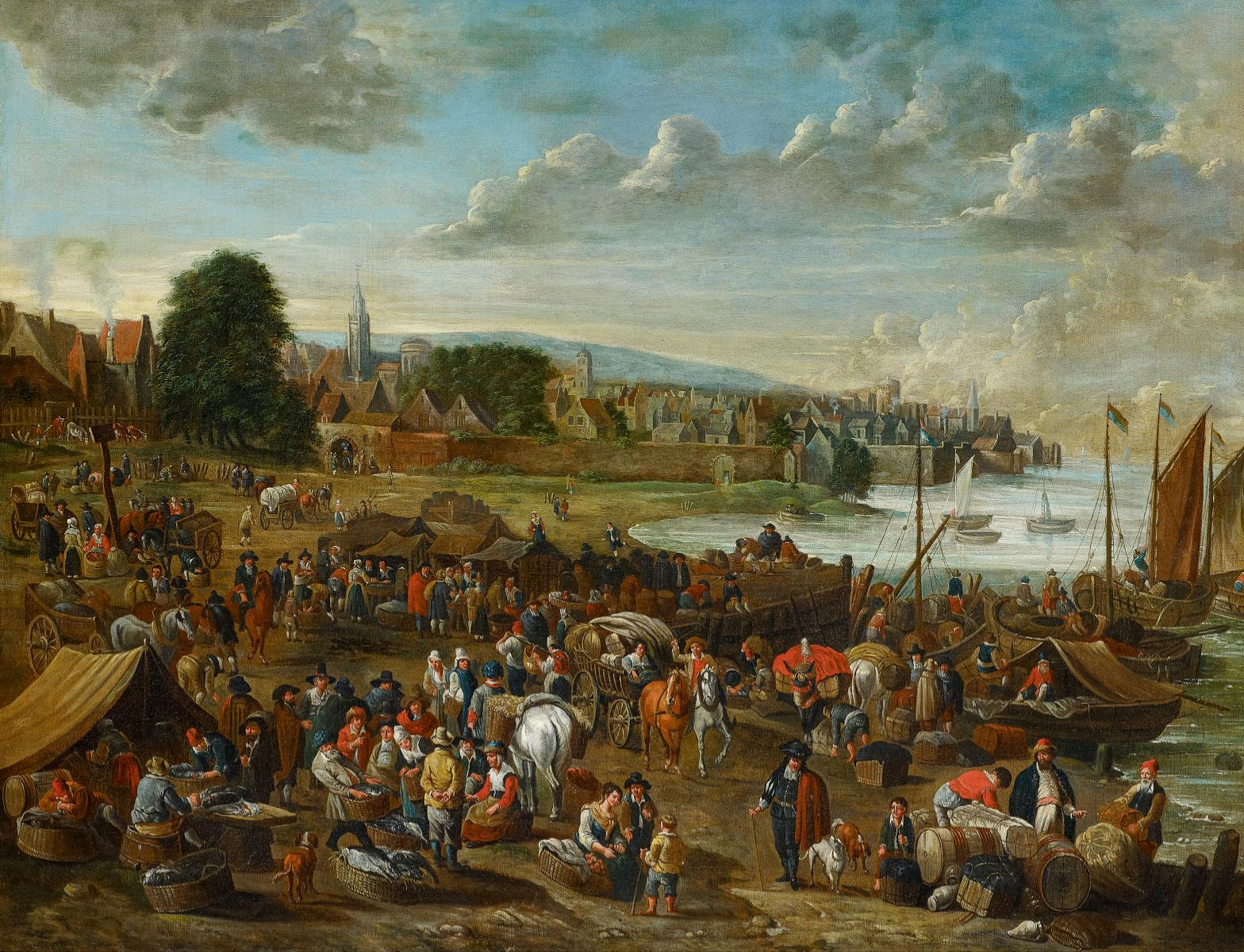
Market outside a town on a river

Alexander trained under his father. He became a master in the Antwerp Guild of Saint Luke in 1685.

On 11 August 1685, he married Cornelia Sporckmans, daughter of the Antwerp history painter Hubert Sporckmans. They had three daughters and six sons of whom Jan Frans became a painter. Alexander van Bredael died in Antwerp.

His pupils include his son Jan Frans, Peeter Busschop, Johan Baptist Govaerts, Guielmus van Ryn and Pieter Snyers.

== Work ==
Alexander van Bredael painted in a wide variety of genres including cattle market scenes, Italianate landscapes and village scenes. He is probably best known for his depiction of festivals and processions set in his native Antwerp. His village scenes are reminiscent of the genre scenes of David Teniers the Younger. He also took his inspiration from other Flemish artists. For instance, his composition A Festival in Antwerp likely drew its inspiration from similar paintings representing processions in cities by Flemish artists such as Pieter van Aelst and Erasmus de Bie.

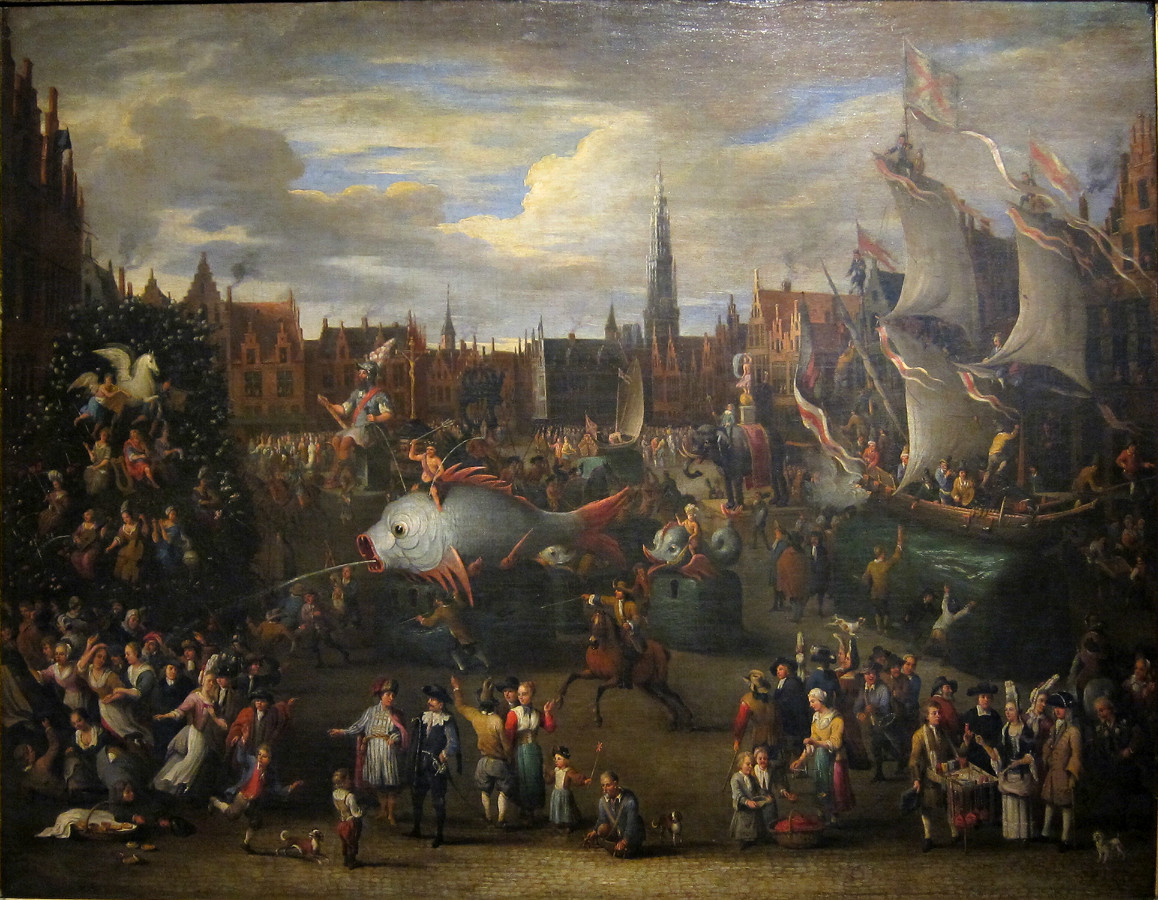
The Ommegang on the Meir in Antwerp

He painted many scenes of cattle markets, which offered him the opportunity to showcase his skill in depicting group scenes populated with many figures as well as his ability to paint animals. He made various Italianate landscapes often including harbour scenes such as the Large pastoral festival among ancient ruins.

Alexander van Bredael produced designs for the tapestry workshops in Oudenaarde. In 1698 he is recorded as supplying designs for six tapestries with genre scenes depicting peasants and gypsies. He provided designs for tapestries that are referred to as Teniers scenes or tapestries. This refers to tapestries related to the Flemish genre painters David Teniers the Younger and David Teniers III. Even though it is not possible to connect the tapestries known as Teniers tapestries, which were woven in numerous weaving centers in Flanders, to any specific designs of these genre painters, these tapestries have been called Teniers tapestries since the early 18th century. Correspondences between the merchant Pieter van Verrren and Alexander van Bredael of 1700 make clear Alexander van Bredael designed some Teniers tapestries. A tapestry depicting an eyeglass vendor was sold at Christie's on 5 February 2003 in New York. It is possible that the landscape in this tapestry was drawn by Pieter Spierinckx, particularly since such a collaboration between Bredael and Spierinckx on Teniers tapestries is mentioned in documents of 1707.
