= Joris van Bredael =

Flemish painter

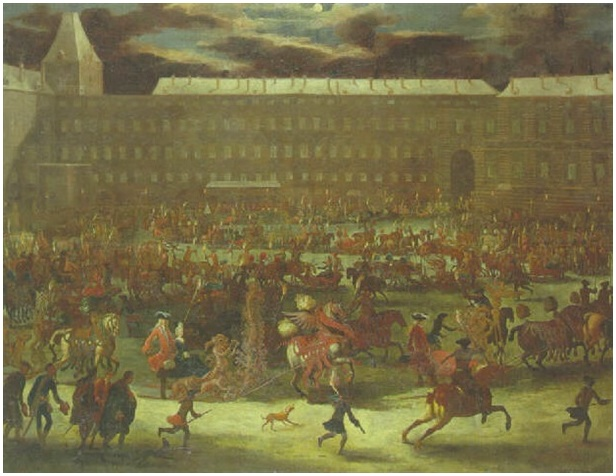
A sledge carousel in the courtyard of the Hofburg, Vienna

Joris van Bredael (1 January 1661 – c. 1706) was a Flemish painter known for his battle scenes and cityscapes representing some popular celebration or feast. He was a member of the prominent artistic family van Bredael.

== Life ==
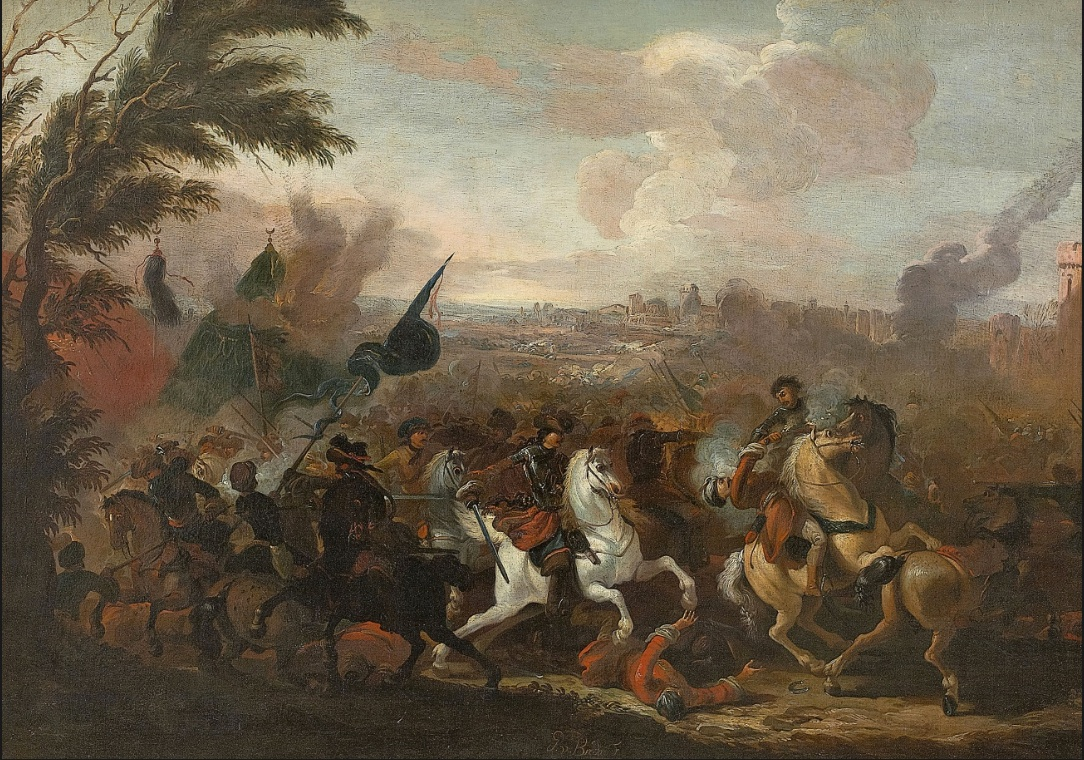
Battle between Christian and Osman Soldiers

He was born in Antwerp into an artist family as the second son of Peeter van Bredael, a well-known painter specializing in market scenes and village feasts set in Italianate landscapes. His mother was An Veldener, the daughter of the sculptor Jennyn Veldener. Two of his brothers, Jan Peeter the Elder and Alexander van Bredael became painters. Joris likely trained under his father. He became a member of the Antwerp Guild of Saint Luke in 1684.

He married Johanna Maria van Diepenbeeck, the daughter of the prominent Baroque painter Abraham van Diepenbeeck, on 25 July 1681. Their two children Jozef and Jan Pieter both became painters. Joris first wife died c. 1689–90.

He worked in Antwerp for the art dealers such as Forchondt. In 1690 Forchondt sent to the representatives of the family business in Vienna six battle scenes by Joris van Bredael including a Relief of Vienna, a Capture of Buda, a Capture of Belgrade and a Capture of Gran.

On the basis of a painting of a winter view of Vienna, which is attributed to him, it is sometimes assumed he spent time in Vienna.

He was the teacher of Joannes Ludovicus Daudenfort and of his two sons.

== Work ==
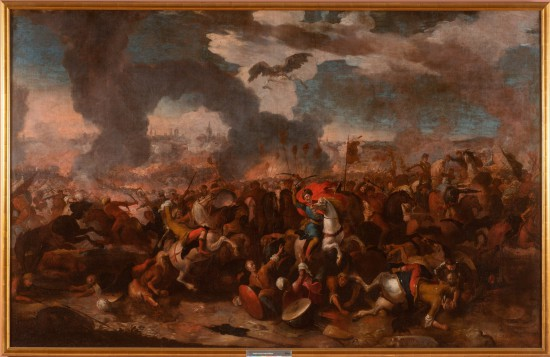
Jan III Sobieski in Vienna

Very few paintings of Joris Bredael have been preserved. He is mainly known for his battle scenes and city views typically representing some popular celebration or feast. An example of a city view is A sledge carousel in the courtyard of the Hofburg, Vienna, in the reign of Leopold I (Sold by Christie's on 24 April 1998 in London, lot 73). It represents a sledge-ride at night in the squares and streets of Vienna, a favourite pastime of the Viennese during the winter months.

A battle piece attributed to him is the Battle between Christian and Osman Soldiers (Sold by Lempertz on 28 September 2011 in Cologne, lot 8). His family members, including his sons, often made similar battle pieces, which seem to have responded to a demand by the European nobility for depictions of their victories over the Turks.
