= Jan Frans van Bredael =

Flemish painter (1686–1750)

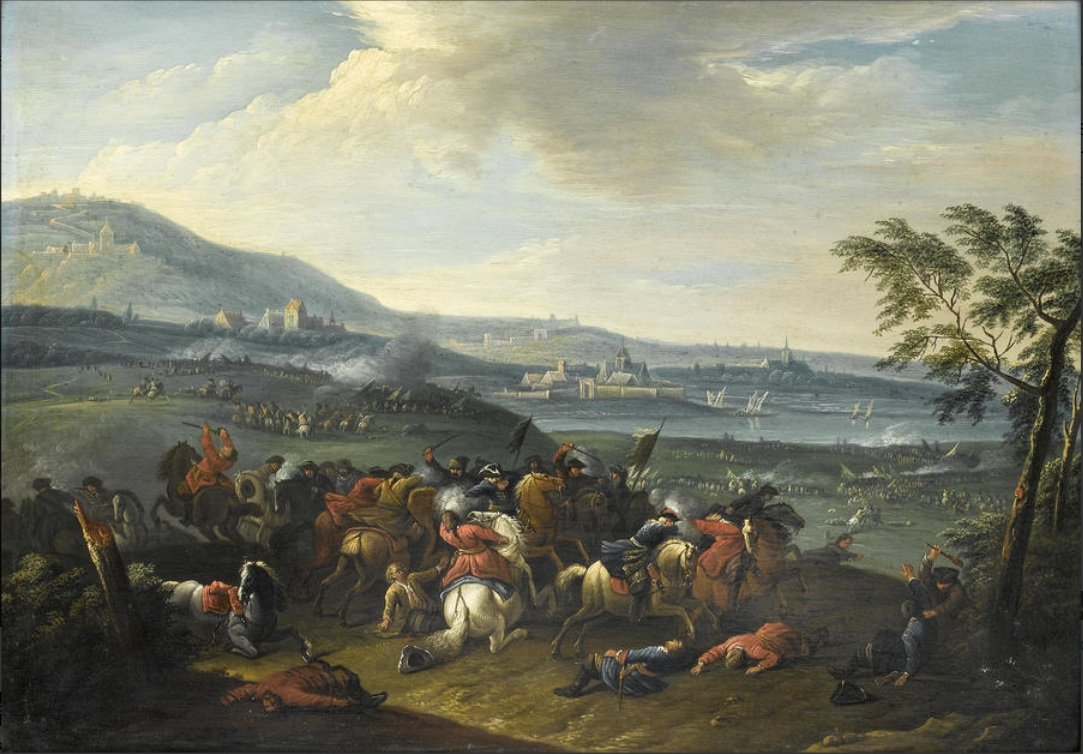
A cavalry skirmish

Jan Frans van Bredael or Jan Frans van Bredael the Elder (1& April 1686 – 19 February 1750) was a Flemish painter known for his landscapes, battle scenes and equestrian paintings. A prominent member of the third generation of the van Bredael family of painters of Antwerp, he was active mainly in his native Antwerp. He worked also in London and Paris where he enjoyed the patronage of an aristocratic clientele.

== Life ==
Jan Frans van Bredael was born into an artist family in Antwerp as the eldest son of Alexander van Bredael (1663–1720) and Cornelia Sporckmans. Jan Frans trained with his father. His father as well as his grandfather Peeter van Bredael and several cousins were also artists.

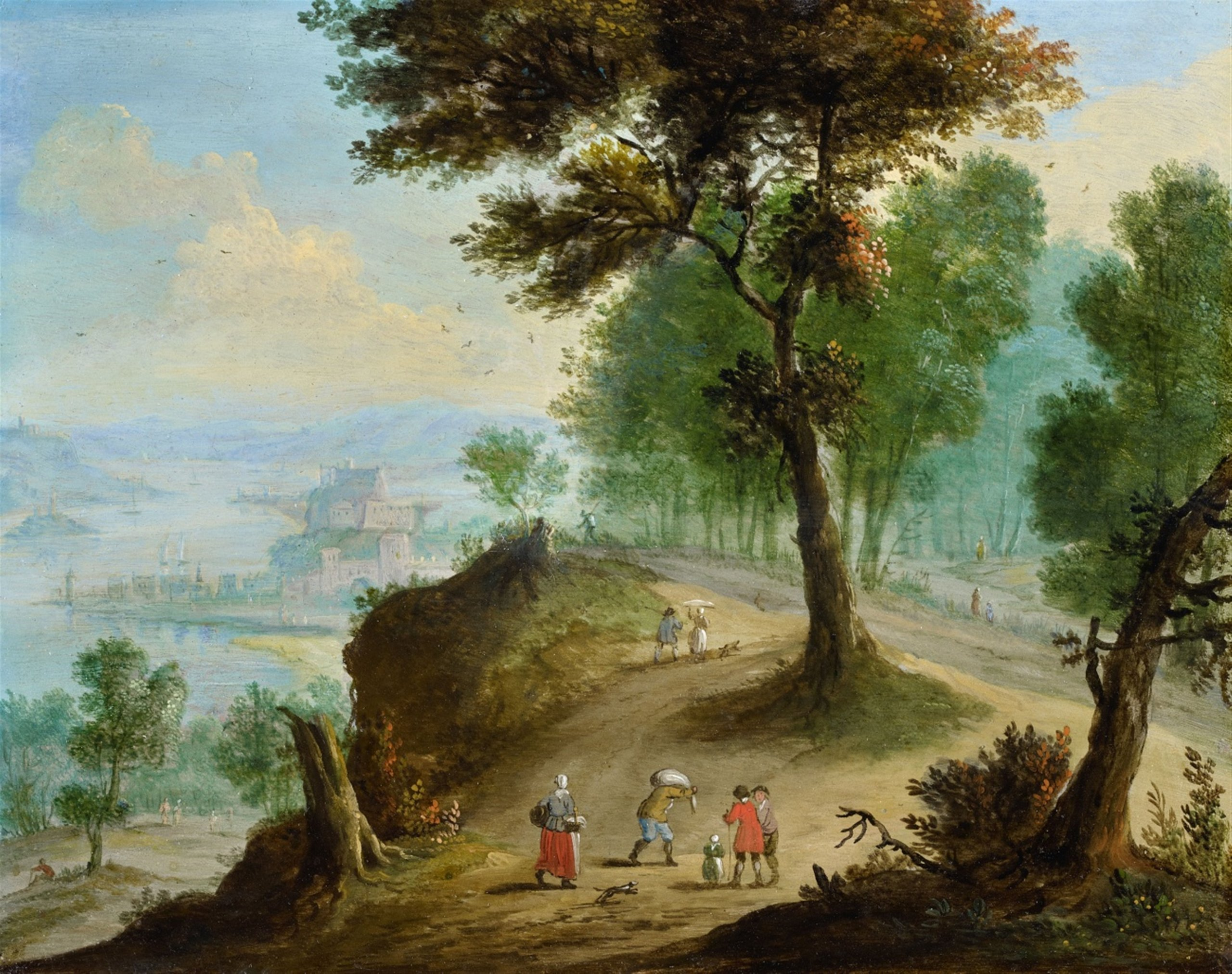
Wooded landscape with figures and a river

Jan Frans trained under his father. In 1706 Jan Frans van Bredael and his cousin Jozef entered into a contract with the Antwerp art dealer Jacob de Witte to produce for a number of years copies after the paintings of Philips Wouwerman and Jan Brueghel the Elder. Under the contract, Jan Frans was to receive for each copy he produced 10 guilders in the first year, 12 guilders in the second and 14 guilders in the third and fourth years plus a bonus of 2 shillings. At the end of the contract he would also get a new blue broadcloth coat. His brother Jozef was paid a marginally lower fee but was not bound like Jan Frans by an exclusivity obligation to work only for Jacob de Witte. Since Jan Frans and Jozef did not sign the copies they made, it is not possible to distinguish who was responsible for the individual copies that were produced under the contract. It is possible that the not so scrupulous art dealer de Witte even sold these copies as originals since the copies were such good imitations of the style of the original artists. Jan Frans finally ended up working for de Witte for a period of nine years.

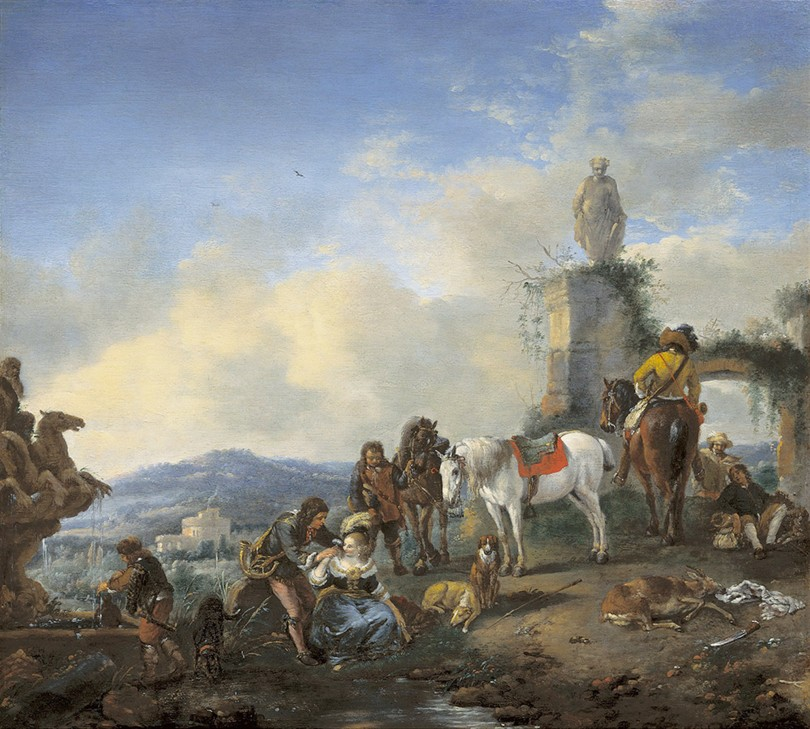
Hunters resting beside a fountain

Jan Frans van Bredael worked in England early in his career (probably before 1716). Little is known with certainty about his residence in England. He is deemed to have enjoyed the patronage of important clients, among whom James Radclyffe, 3rd Earl of Derwentwater and possibly even the King.

In the period from 1719 to 1725 he was active in Paris. He returned to Antwerp in 1725 where he joined the Antwerp Guild of Saint Luke in the same year. He became deacon of the Guild the next year and again in the years 1733, 1734 and 1735. Jan Frans van Bredael married Catharina de Rijck. The couple had two daughters and a son. The son who was also named Jan Frans (born in 1729) became a painter.

In his lifetime van Bredael enjoyed an excellent reputation. It is reported that when King Louis XV of France visited Antwerp visited his studio in 1746 he acquired four small works from the artist.

Jan Frans van Bredael died in Antwerp in 1750.

== Work ==
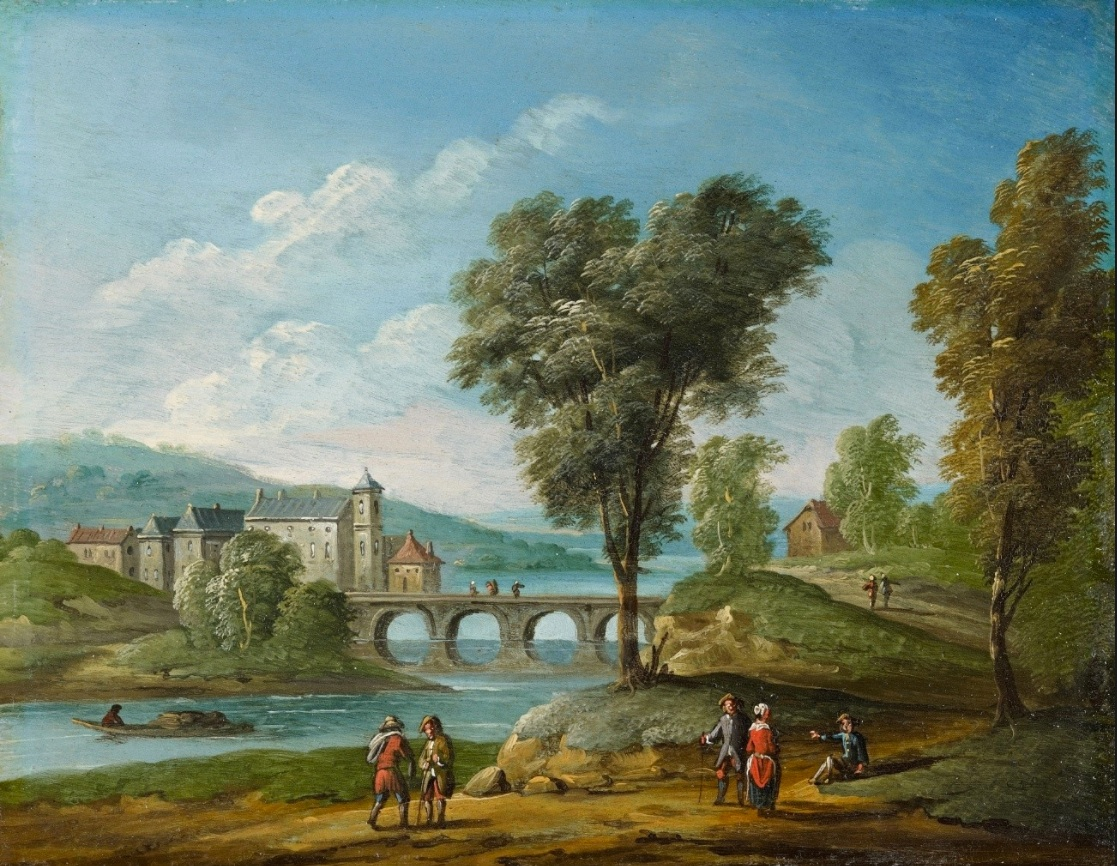
Landscape with castle and bridge

Jan Frans van Bredael painted in a variety of genres including history and religious painting. However, he is best known for his landscapes with genre scenes, battle and hunting scenes and equestrian paintings. While he initially mainly copied works of Wouwerman and Brueghel, Jan Frans van Bredael was able to develop his own style. Van Bredael quoted Wouwerman's tropes in his own compositions of equestrian and battle scenes. In his landscapes he remained closer in style to Jan Brueghel the Elder.

As many of the members of the extended van Bredael family painted in a similar style and in the same genres, it is not always easy or possible to ascribe a particular work to a specific van Bredael.

As van Bredael appears to have worked mainly for the export market, very few of his works are in public collections in his home country.

=== Notes ===
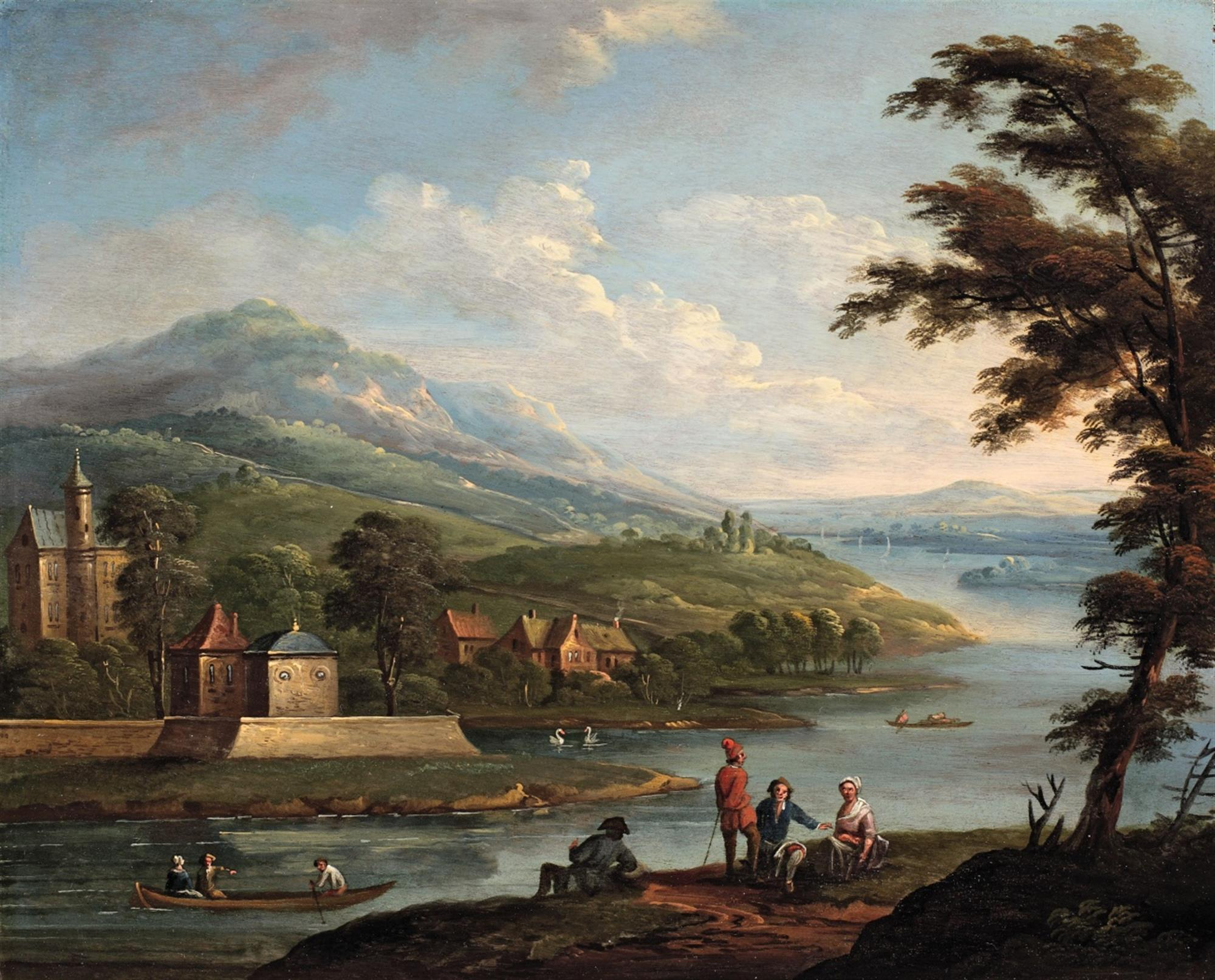
A River Landscape with a Fortress
