= Jan van der Asselt =

Flemish painter

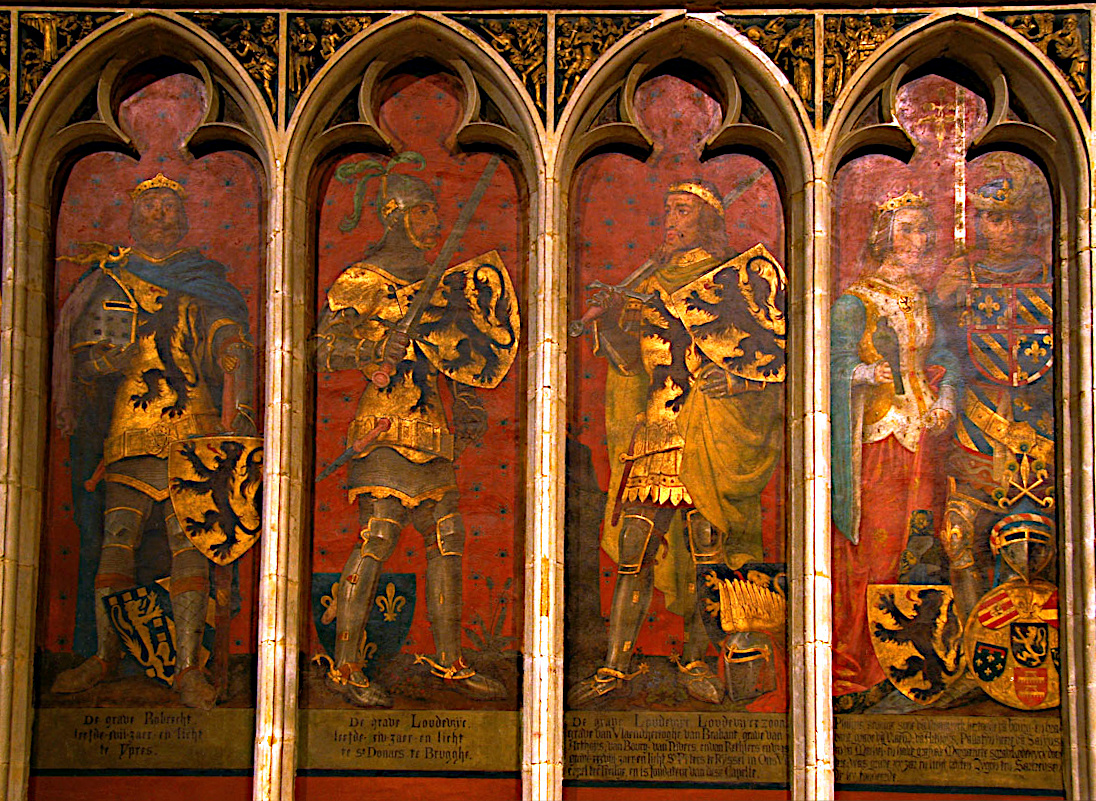
Four portraits of counts of Flanders, from the Gravenkapel in Kortrijk. These were originally painted by Jan van der Asselt but heavily restored and overpainted later.

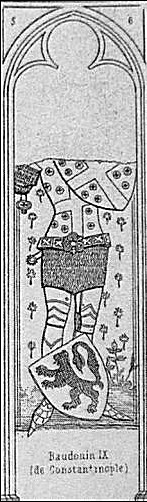
Drawing of the portrait of Latin Emperor Baldwin I by Van der Asselt, showing the condition when it was rediscovered in 1858 and before it was heavily restored in the late 19th century

Jan van der Asselt or Jan van der Hasselt (ca. 1330–1335 – between 1395 and 1398) was a Flemish painter.

Jan van der Asselt was born in Ghent somewhere between 1330 and 1335, as the son of grocer Jan van der Asselt. The first mention of Van der Asselt as a painter is in 1364, when he decorated the chapel in the Prinsenhof in Ghent, the residence of Count Louis II of Flanders. On 9 September 1365 Van der Asselt officially became the court painter for the count, a function he held until at least 1377. In 1379 he made a wall painting of the Virgin Mary in the Prinsenhof.

In and around 1372, Van der Asselt decorated the Gravenkapel in Kortrijk, which would become the burial chapel of count Louis. This large cycle of wall paintings included 28 full length portraits of all Counts of Flanders, 4 saints, and a Last Judgment. Only some fragments of these works have survived. They were highly regarded in their time, with Philip the Bold giving a monetary reward to van der Asselt in 1373.

The final mention of Jan van der Asselt as a painter is a payment he received in 1386 for an altar painting in the church of the Franciscans in Ghent. He was last mentioned alive in 1395, and was dead by October 1398.

It is possible that he was also active as a miniature painter and that he is responsible for the works currently grouped under the notname Master of Lodewijk van Male ("Lodewijk van Male" is the Dutch name for Louis II). This master was active around 1366, and five works are attributed to him: a breviary, a missal, an antiphonary and a bible (all kept in the Royal Library of Belgium), and another missal in the Museum Meermanno in The Hague.

Jan van der Asselt was twice convicted for violence against women, in 1359 and 1388.
