= Jean de Looz =

Jean de Looz or Jan Beeck was born at Looz, and was a monk of the convent of St. Lawrence, near Liège, of which he became the abbot in 1509. He is considered, after the brothers Van Eyck, to be the most distinguished among the ancient painters of Liège. He painted the greater number of the pictures in the church of his convent, and died in 1516.
