= Jan Baptist Monteyne =

Flemish painter

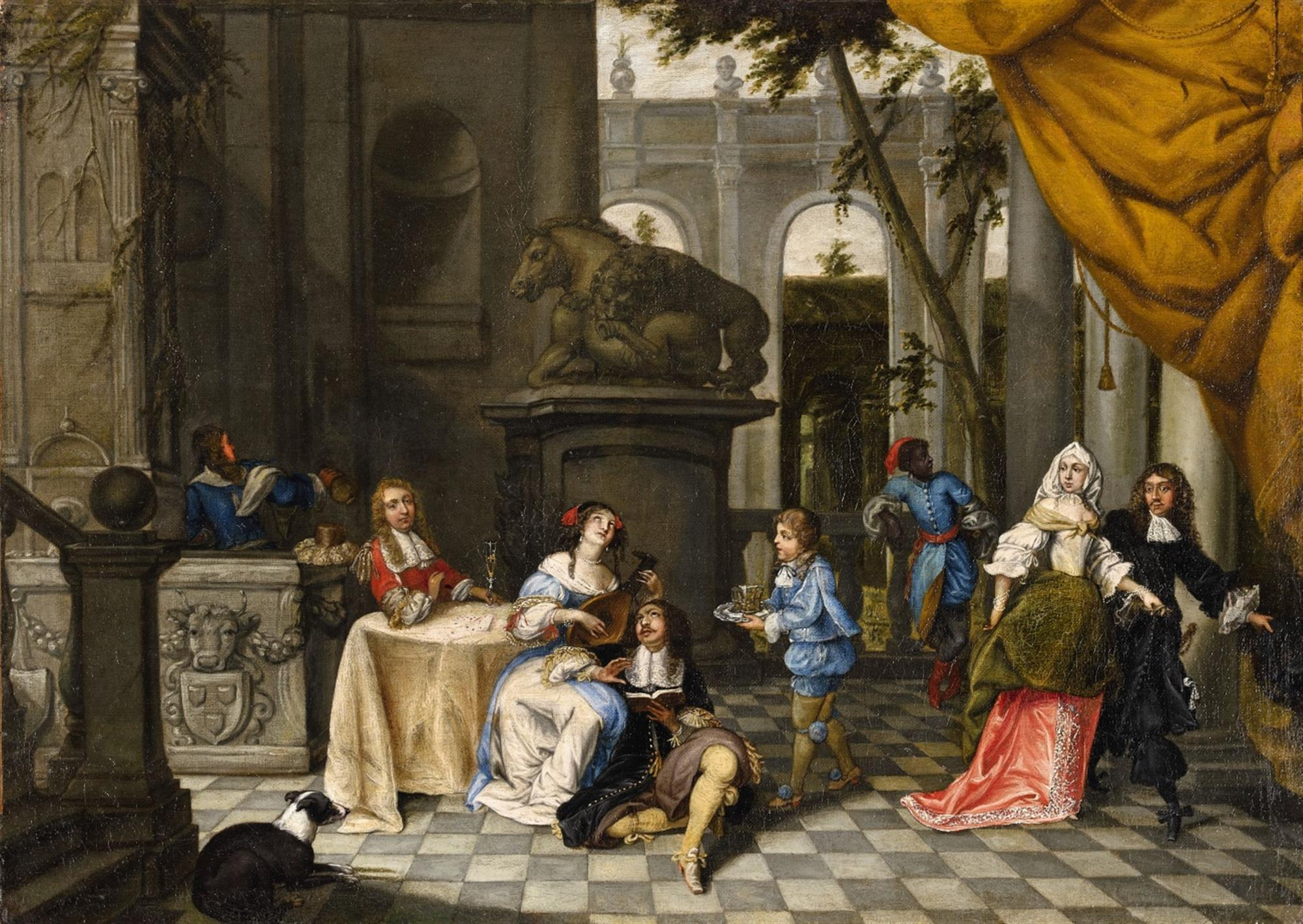
An Interior with Courtship Scenes and Servants

Jan Baptist Monteyne or J.B. Monteyne (fl 1717–18) was an 18th-century Flemish painter. He is mainly known for his genre scenes and landscapes.

== Life ==
He was registered as a master of the Guild of St Luke in Antwerp in the guild year 1717–1718.

== Work ==
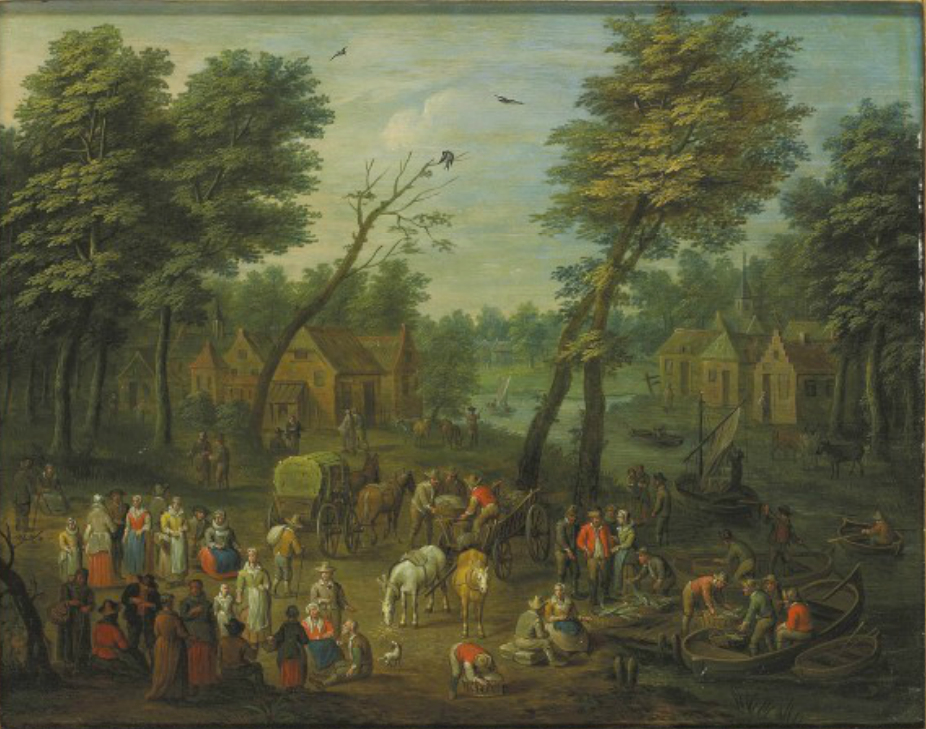
A village landscape with a crowd of peasants and fishermen

Only a small group of works by Jan Baptist Monteyne is recorded. The artist is known for genre scenes and landscapes.

His genre works mainly depicted village scenes with many figures and conversation pieces. These compositions were influenced by the earlier Flemish genre works of David Teniers the Younger while his landscapes are indebted to the river landscapes of Jan Brueghel the Elder. An example is the composition A village landscape with a crowd of peasants and fishermen (At Christie's on 9 December 2011, London, Lot 286), which is clearly based on Jan Brueghel the Elder's style without appearing to have any direct prototype in Brueghel's oeuvre.

Recent research has ascribed to Monteyne a series of paintings that had previously been attributed to another Flemish genre painter of his time, Pieter Angelis.
