= Egidus Nuemans =

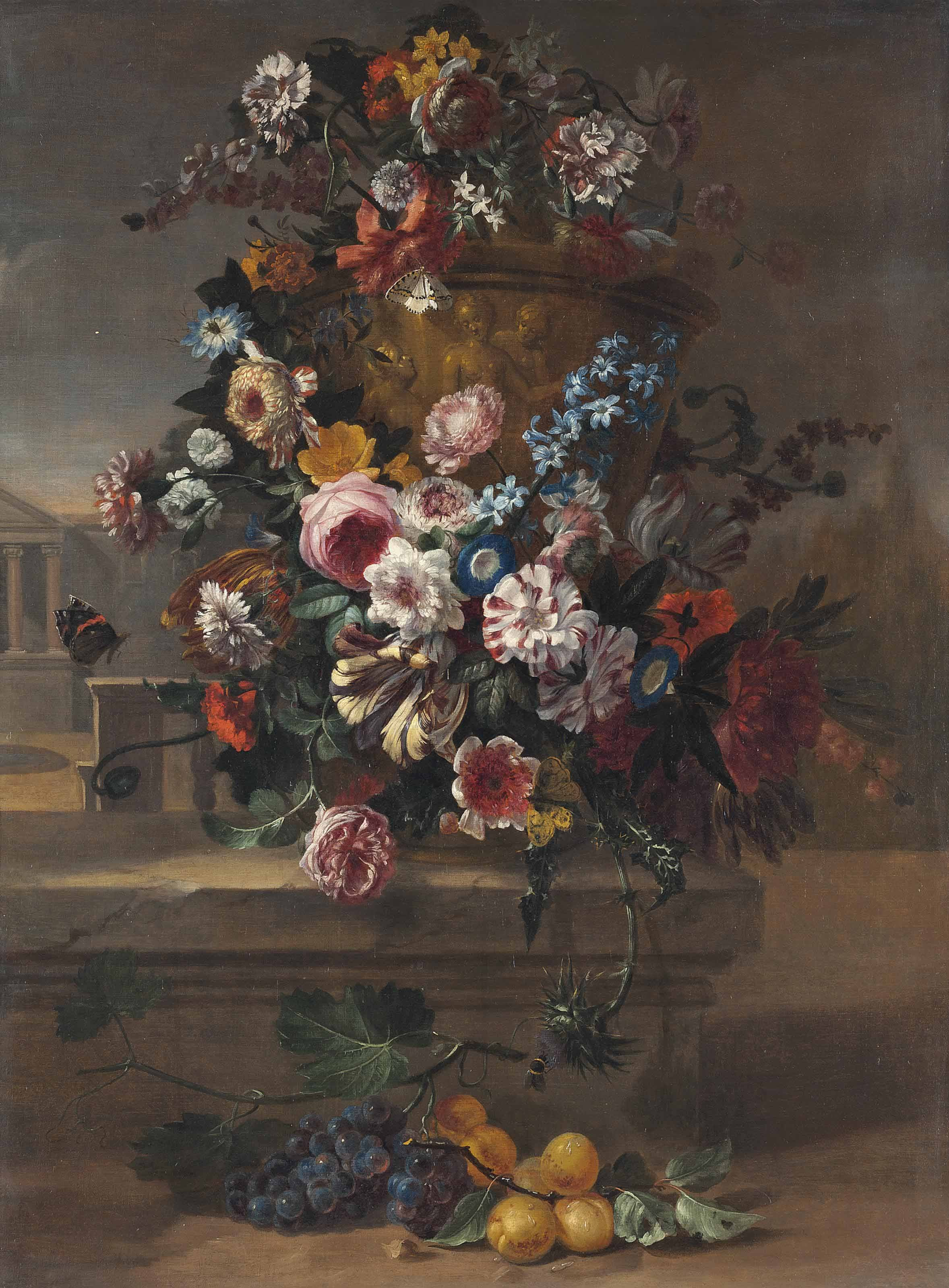
Flowers with butterflies and a bumblebee in a sculpted urn on a stone ledge with grapes and apricots, a classical villa beyond

Egidus Nuemans or Egidius Nuemans (active in Antwerp 1691–1735) was a still life painter active in Antwerp in the second half of the 17th century. Only a few works by his hand depicting still lifes with flowers and fruit are currently known.

== Life and work ==
Nothing is known about the life of Egidus Nuemans. He is believed to have been active in Flanders in the second half of the 17th century.

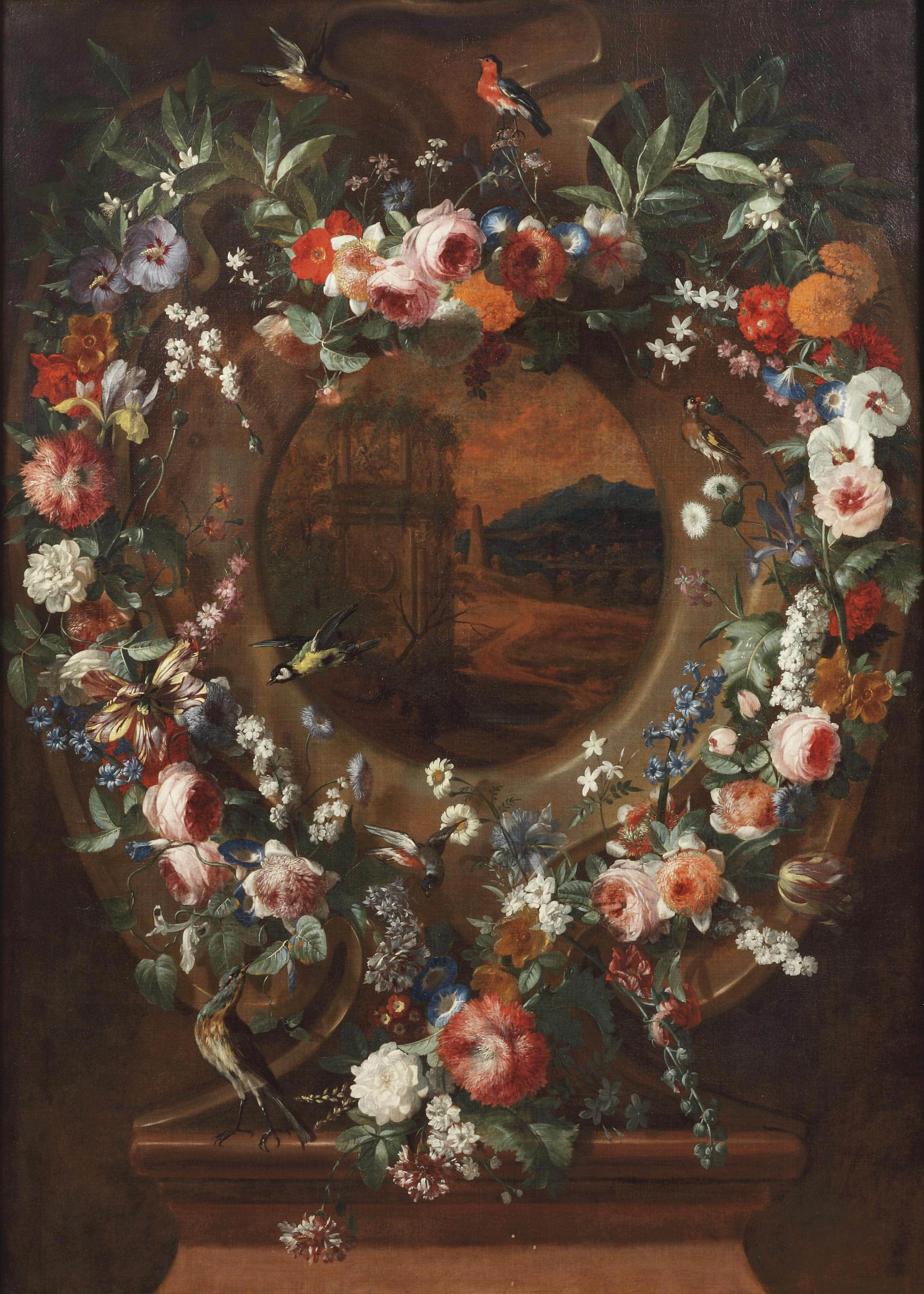
A stone cartouche surrounded by garlands of flowers and birds with an Italianate landscape in the centre

Egidus Nuemans was a painter of flower and fruit still lifes. Only three known works by him are known, all of which were recently auctioned in the art market. Of these works two are signed. All three works depict a flower still life (one in the form of a flower garland) with a landscape element. Insects and birds are included in two of the works.

One of his works referred to as Roses, tulips, peonies, carnations, morning glory, thistle and other flowers with butterflies and a bumblebee, in a sculpted urn on a stone ledge with grapes and apricots, a classical villa (At Christie's, 13 January 2016, London, lot 117) has in the past been attributed to Gaspar Peeter Verbruggen the Younger. His work has similarities with that of this late 17th, early 18th century Flemish still life painter.
