= Pieter van Overschie =

Flemish painter

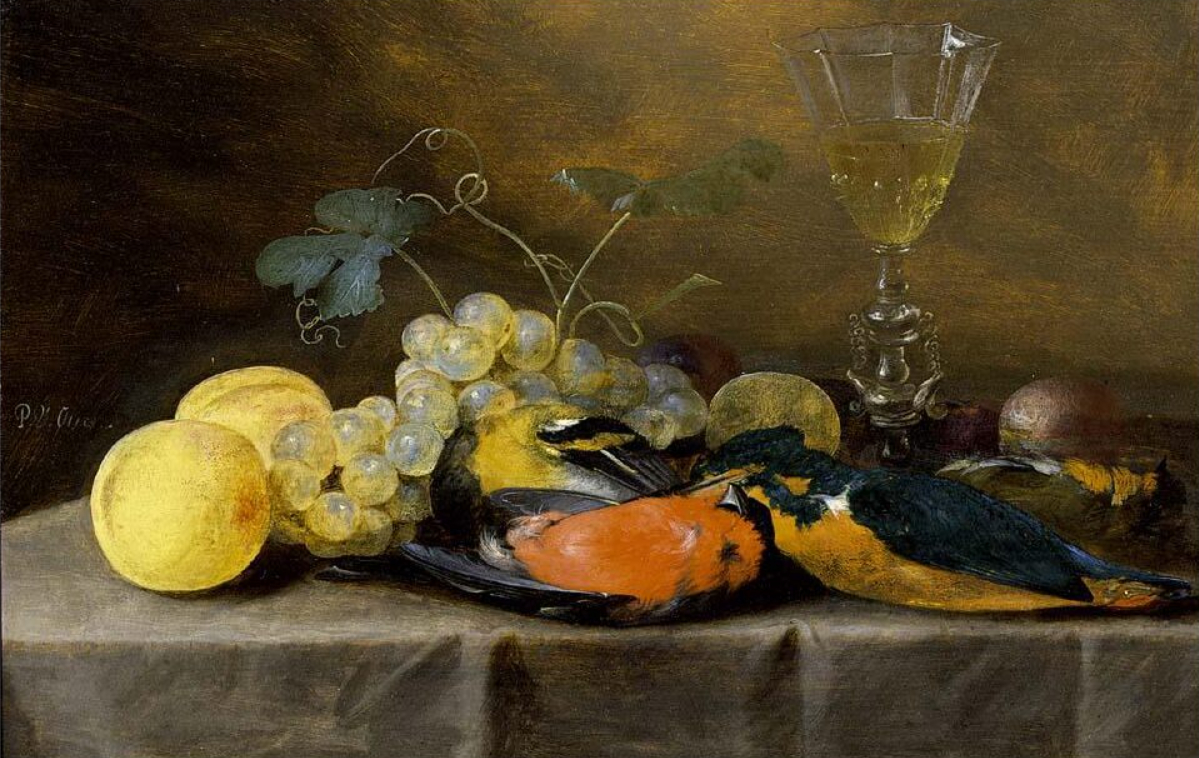
Still life with two finches, a kingfisher, grapes, peaches, prunes and a façon-de-venise wineglass, all on a draped table

Pieter van Overschie or Pieter van Overschee (fl. 1640–1672) was a Flemish still life painter who was active in Antwerp between 1640 and 1672. He is known for his fruit still lifes and game still lifes.

== Life ==
Virtually nothing is recorded about Pieter van Overschie 's life. His date and place of birth are unknown. His father was probably the art dealer Blasius van Oversee. He is first recorded at the Guild of Saint Luke of Antwerp as a 'wijnmeester' (son of a master) between 18 September 1640 and 18 September 1641. There is no record of the artist having been registered as a master of the local Guild.

He is believed to have been active in Antwerp from 1640 to 1672, the period from which signed works by his hand have been preserved. He is in some publications mentioned as working in Leiden. This is an error and the result of confusion with the Leiden painter Pieter Dircksz. van Overzee, who became master in the Guild of Saint Luke of Leiden in 1661.

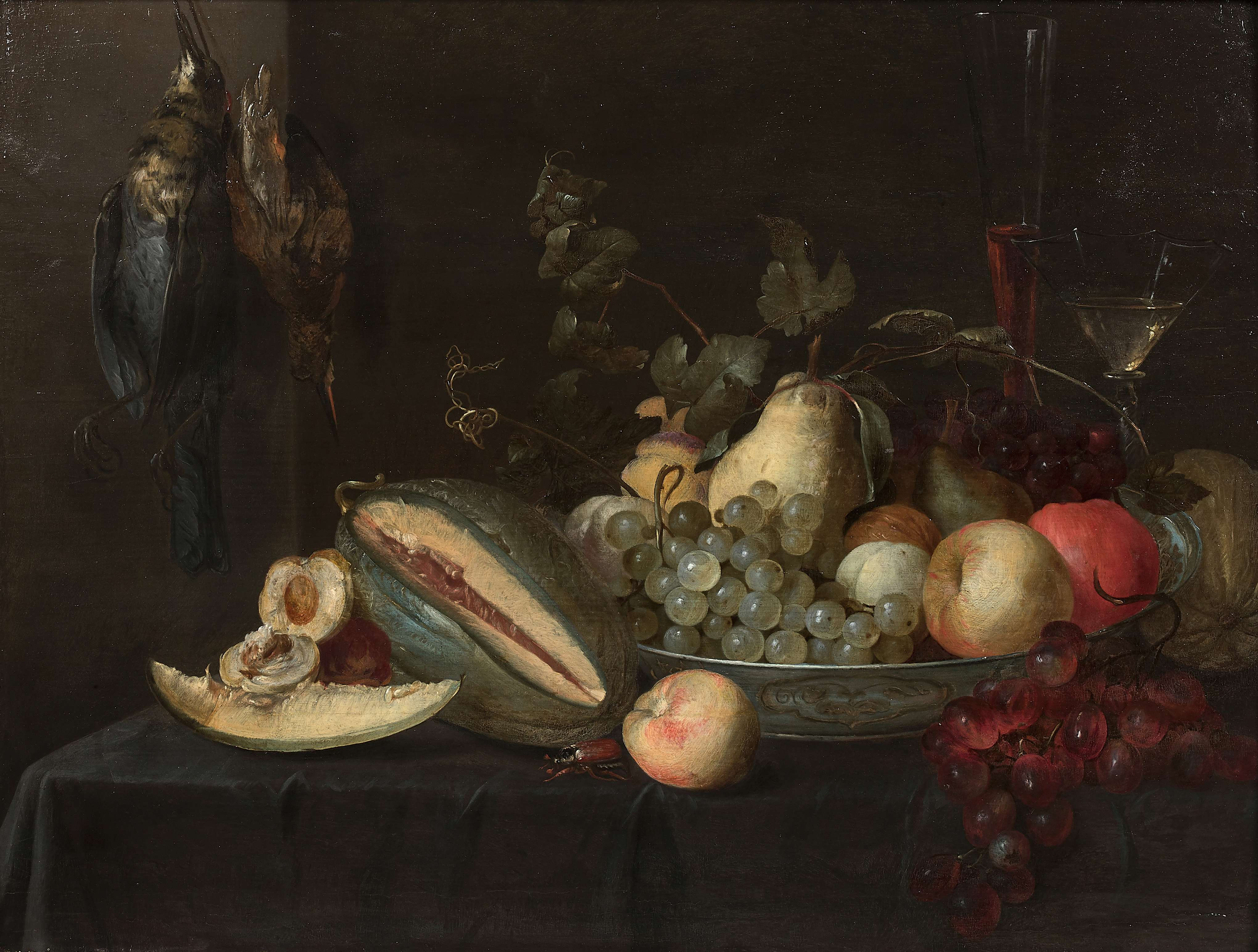
Bowl of fruit on an entablature and hanging birds

His last known dated work is from 1672. He likely died in or after 1672.

== Work ==
Only a handful of paintings have thus far been securely attributed to van Overschie. He painted fruit still lifes and game still lifes. His dated works are 10 still lifes, which bear dates between 1651 and 1672.

Van Overschie is regarded as a member of the circle of painters who were influenced by Jan Davidsz de Heem, a Dutch still life painter who was active in Antwerp at the same time as van Overschie and was himself influenced by Flemish still life painters such as Frans Snyders, Adriaen van Utrecht and Daniel Seghers. Van Overschie's style clearly shows the influence of the school of Jan Davidsz. de Heem. His paintings also show a painterly affinity to works by the Dutch painter Abraham van Beyeren and the Flemish painters Jan Fyt, Alexander Adriaenssen and Adriaen van Utrecht.
