= Jean de Reyn =

Flemish painter (1610–1678)

- Born: 1610? Dunkirk, Spanish Netherlands
- Died: 20 May 1678; Dunkirk, Kingdom of France
- Occupation: Painter

Jan van Rijn or Jean de Reyn (c. 1610 – 20 May 1678) was a 17th-century European painter of the Flemish Baroque movement. "John of the Rhine" was a native of Dunkirk, a coastal city along the English Channel, located near the present-day French–Belgian border. He went to England as a young man in company with Antoon van Dyck, learning from the master and assisting with painting projects. After Van Dyck's death, de Reyn returned to Dunkirk where he had a successful but lower-profile career painting ecclesiastical commissions, and portraits of wealthy businessmen, celebrity pirates, and their wives. His skill level and style is considered to be close to that of van Dyck himself.

== Biography ==
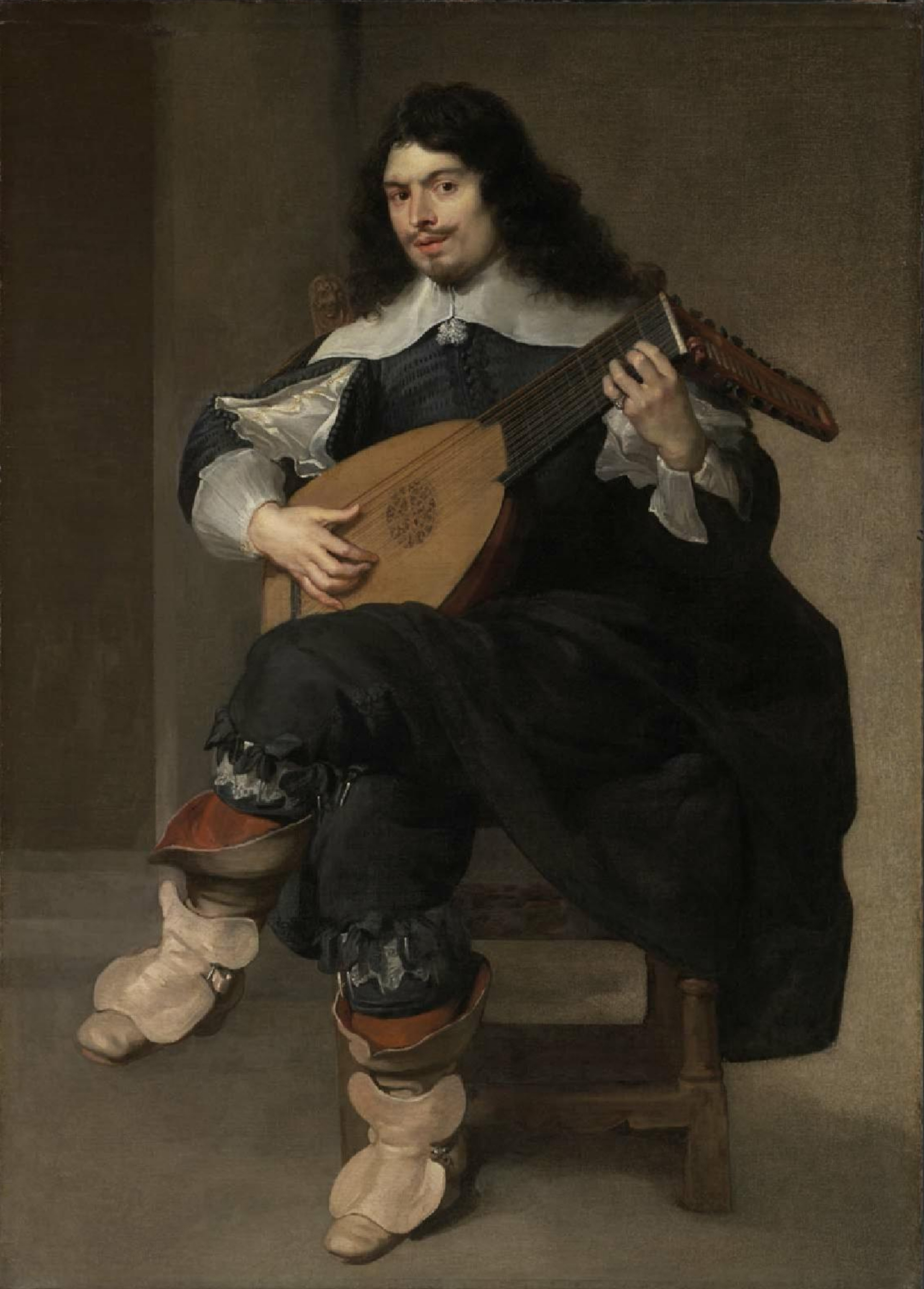
Portrait made by de Reyn of lutenist and composer Jacques Gallot (1625–1695), held in the collection of the Boston Museum of Fine Arts

Born at Dunkirk about the year 1610, when he was young he went to Antwerp, where he became a student of van Dyck. Such was his progress under that master, that he was invited to accompany him to England, where he continued to assist him until van Dyck's death in 1641. He afterwards established himself in his native town, where he painted several admirable pictures for the churches, and was much employed as a portrait painter. The most notable of his works for the churches at Dunkirk was the Death of the Four Royal Martyrs (Les Quatre Martyrs), depicting four Christian martyrs executed early in the 4th century under the Roman emperor Diocletian. The work, now located at the Musée des Beaux-Arts de Dunkerque, was commissioned for the chapel of the guild of stonemasons within the Church of Saint-Éloi. The four martyrs were the traditional patron saints of stonemasons and the building trades. He also painted the baptism of Totila (Baptême de Totila) for the church of the English convent. (Note: This may refer to the Benedictine abbey organized at Dunkirk by Mary Knatchbull in 1662; the founding abbess was Mary Caryll; the abbey was sacked and scattered in 1793 during the French Revolution.) The principal altarpiece in the parochial church of St. Martin (Église Saint-Martin de Bergues), at Bergues St. Vinox, near Dunkirk, is by this master: it depicts Herodias bringing the head of St. John to Herod (Héro-diade apportant la tête de saint Jean). There are many of his portraits in private collections, "which are little inferior to those of Van Dyck." De Reyn died at Dunkirk on 20 May 1678, and was buried in Saint-Éloi.

== Reputation ==
A biographical dictionary of Flemish painters characterized his work as "correct drawing; pure and soft colors; weak brushwork; beautiful arrangement; skillful and effective chiaroscuro. His portraits are worthy of his master." He was described by a Van Dyck biographer in 1878 as "a man of high talents, but too dependent to carve his own destiny." A history of western painting generally asserted "works chiefly pass as the works of Van Dyck; when he went back to Dunkirk for 30 years he painted much for the churches there, and his style and handling we can thus settle," and grouped him with two other "alien" assistants of Van Dyck, David Beck and Adriaen Hanneman.

== Other works ==
The Musée des Beaux-Arts de Dunkerque holds at least a dozen of his paintings, including portraits of the Dunkerquois corsairs Mathieu Rombout and Admiral Colaert (attributions to Reyn contested as of 1891). The Dunkirk city art museum also holds de Reyn's pictures of Alexander Leys, "syndic of the Corporation of Butchers" and his wife. As of 1880 his picture of the wedding of Thetis and Peleus (Noces de Thétis et Pelée) was in Madrid. The Brussels Museum has a Female Portrait dated 1637 that was misattributed to him beginning in the 19th century.

== See also ==
- Antony Valabrègue
