= Master LC =

Master LC was a Flemish painter who flourished from c. 1525–50. His painting, "The Arrival in Bethlehem" (1540) is owned by the Metropolitan Museum of Art.
