= Joost van Hamme =

Flemish painter

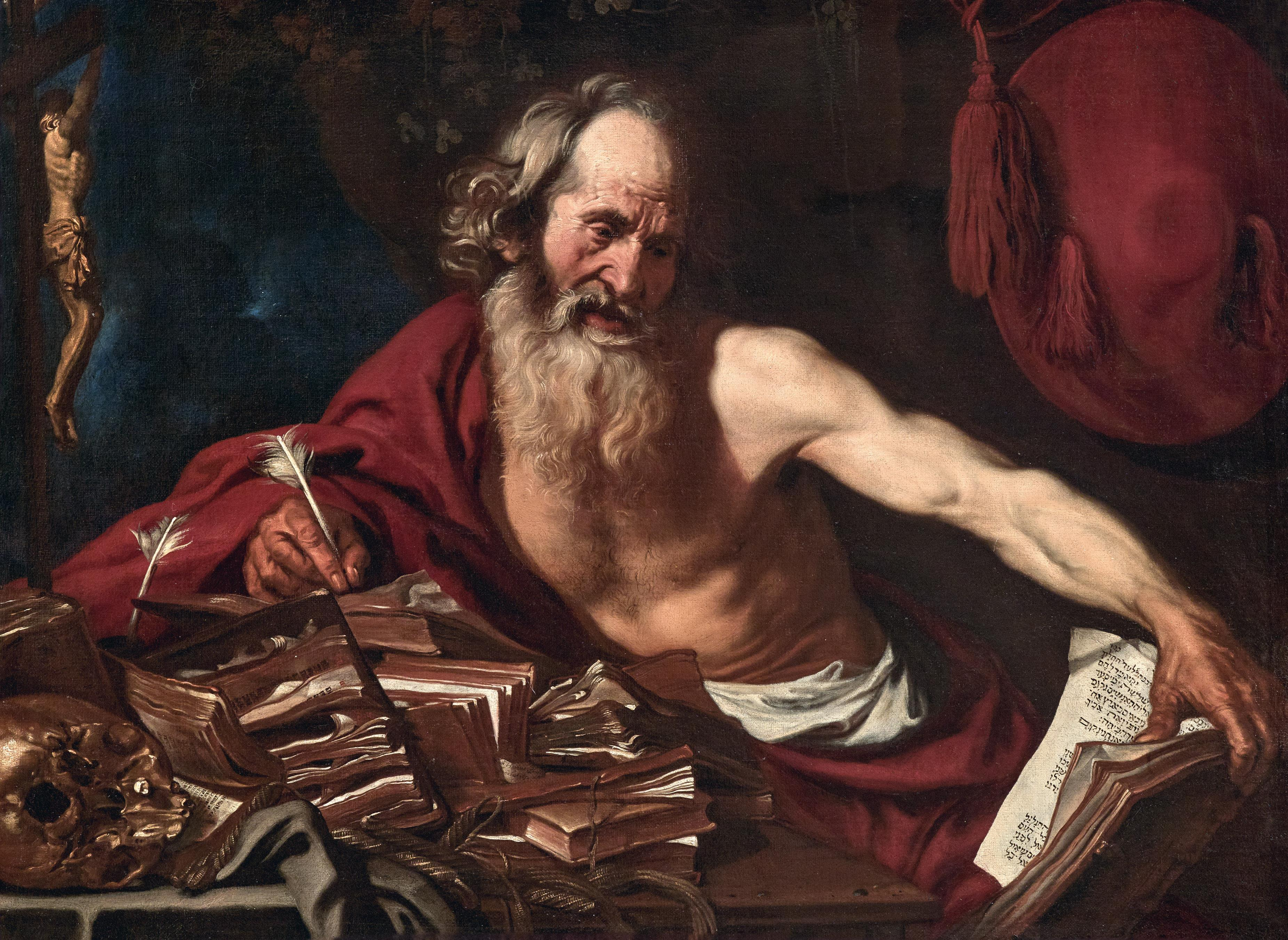
Saint Jerome

Joost van Hamme or Jodocus van Hamme, last name also sometimes rendered as van de Hamme (1629/30 – after 1657) was a Flemish painter who after training in his native Brussels was active in Italy in the mid-17th century. The artist likely died young and only a few works by him, all executed in a Caravaggesque style, are known. He painted landscapes, history subjects, portraits and still lifes.

== Life ==
Very little is known about the life of van Hamme. He was a native of Brussels and his father's first name was Johannes (Jan). He registered as a pupil of the painter Gaspar de Crayer in the register of the Corporation of Painters of Brussels on 20 February 1642. His year of birth was therefore likely 1629 or 1630 as pupils typically first registered at the age of 12. His master de Crayer was a painter from Antwerp known for his Counter-Reformation altarpieces and portraits executed in the Flemish Baroque style created by Rubens. He had moved from Antwerp to Brussels where he operated a large workshop and worked as a court painter to the governors of the Habsburg Netherlands.

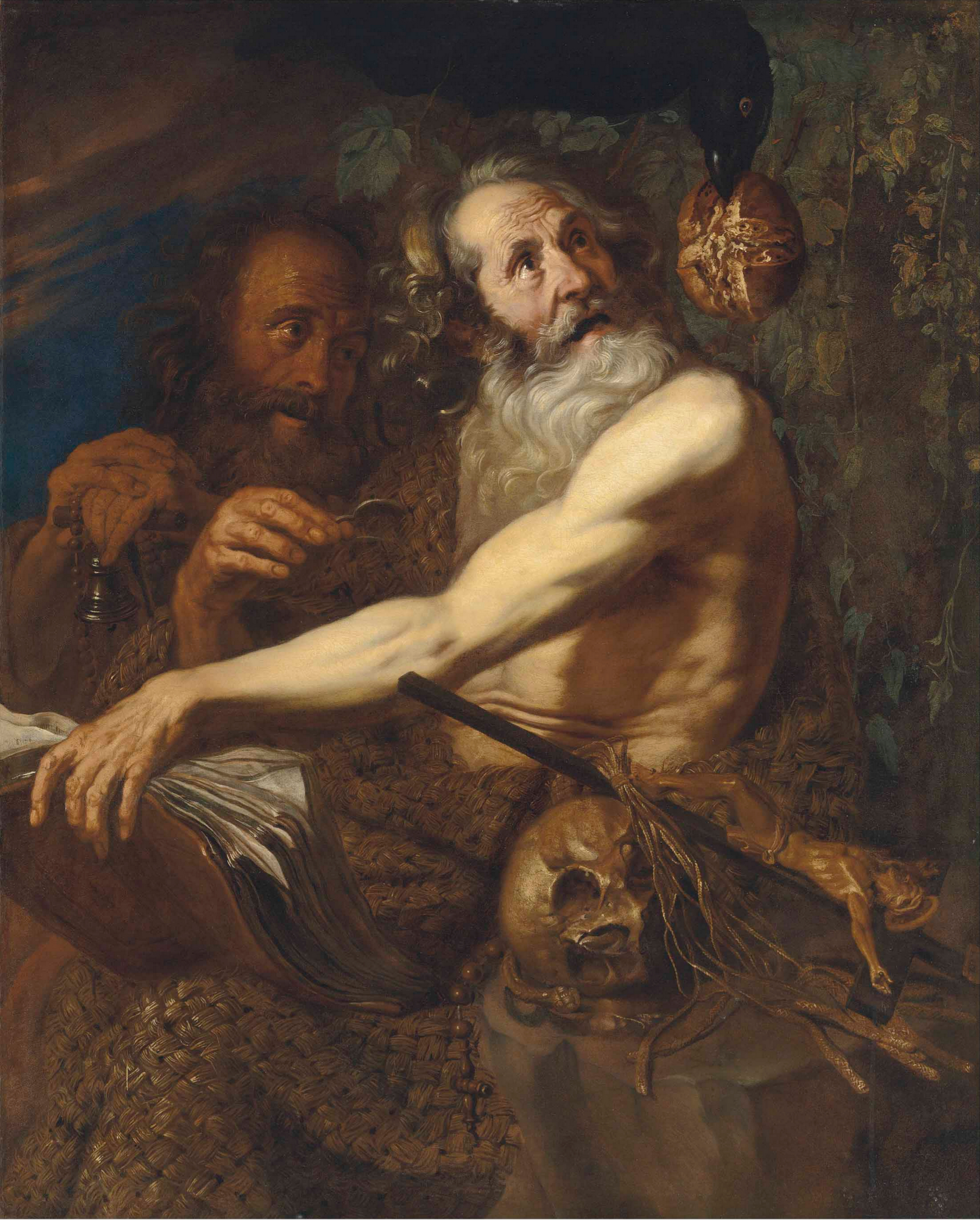
St Paul the Hermit and Anthony Abbot

Van Hamme travelled to Rome where he was recorded in 1654 as living on Vicolo del Bottino, dalla Piazza della Trinità with Guido Giacchetti. In 1656 he shared a house on Strada Paolina with Flemish painters Gillis Backereel and Frederick van Steenlant (Frederick Stielant) and the young Italian painter Luigi Garzi. In 1657 he was recorded as living on Via Babuino verso il Corso 21. No further records regarding the artist are known after 1657.

== Work ==
Only very few works by Joost van Hamme are known. They are typically signed. His known works include scenes with Christian saints, a Baroque still life and a portrait. The influence of the Caravaggist movement in his works is shown in their dramatic use of light and shade and high level of realism. He was an accomplished figurative painter and was equally skilled at depicting still life objects in a clear and structured manner.

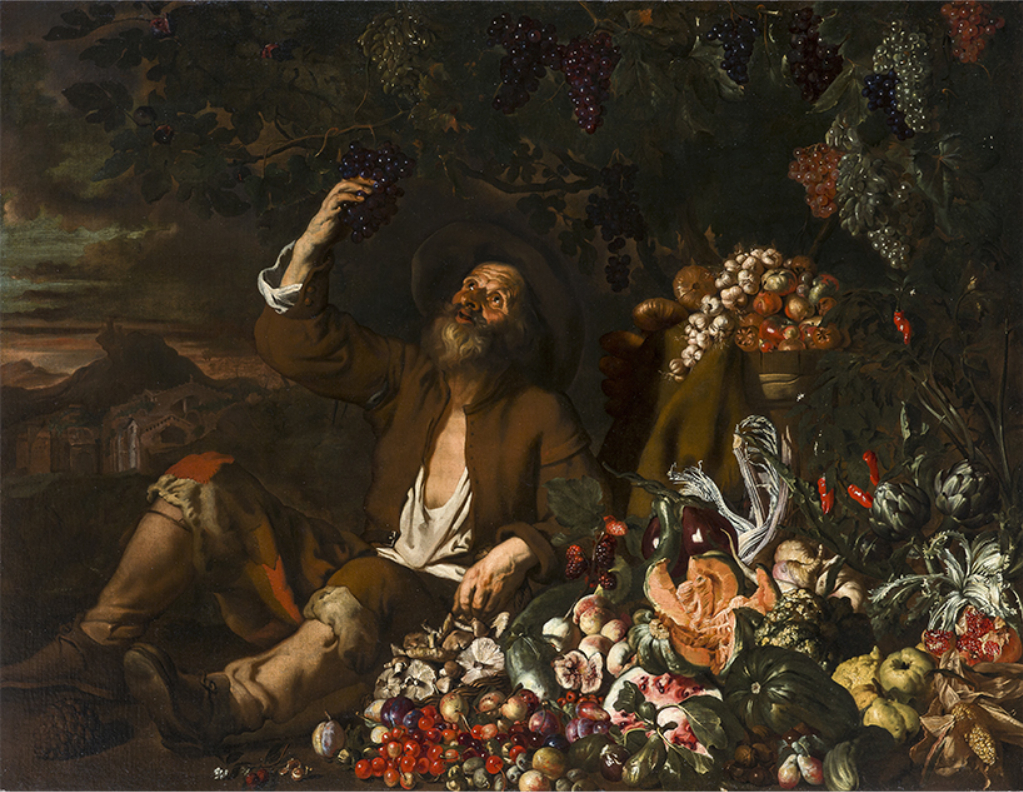
Old man lying next to vegetables and fruit

His Old man lying next to vegetables and fruit falls in the category of the complex Baroque still lifes that were popular in Rome at the time. Other Flemish painters who were active in Rome at the time of his stay such as Joannes Hermans also painted similar grandiose still lifes combining human figures, flowers and fruit. The Old man lying next to vegetables and fruit shows an old man reclining in a landscape next to an abundant arrangement of vegetables and fruit on the floor. The work contrasts between the character's humble appearance and the abundance of food in the scene. The human figure appears almost secondary to the produce in the foreground. Ignoring the abundance of food next to him, the old man is looking at a bunch of grapes hanging on a tree above his head which he is pulling down with his right hand. The man is a peasant who, at the end of a day of hard work, is finally able to savor the fruits of his labor. The painting is thus a summons to enjoy and appreciate the gifts that nature offers.
