= Bernaert de Bridt =

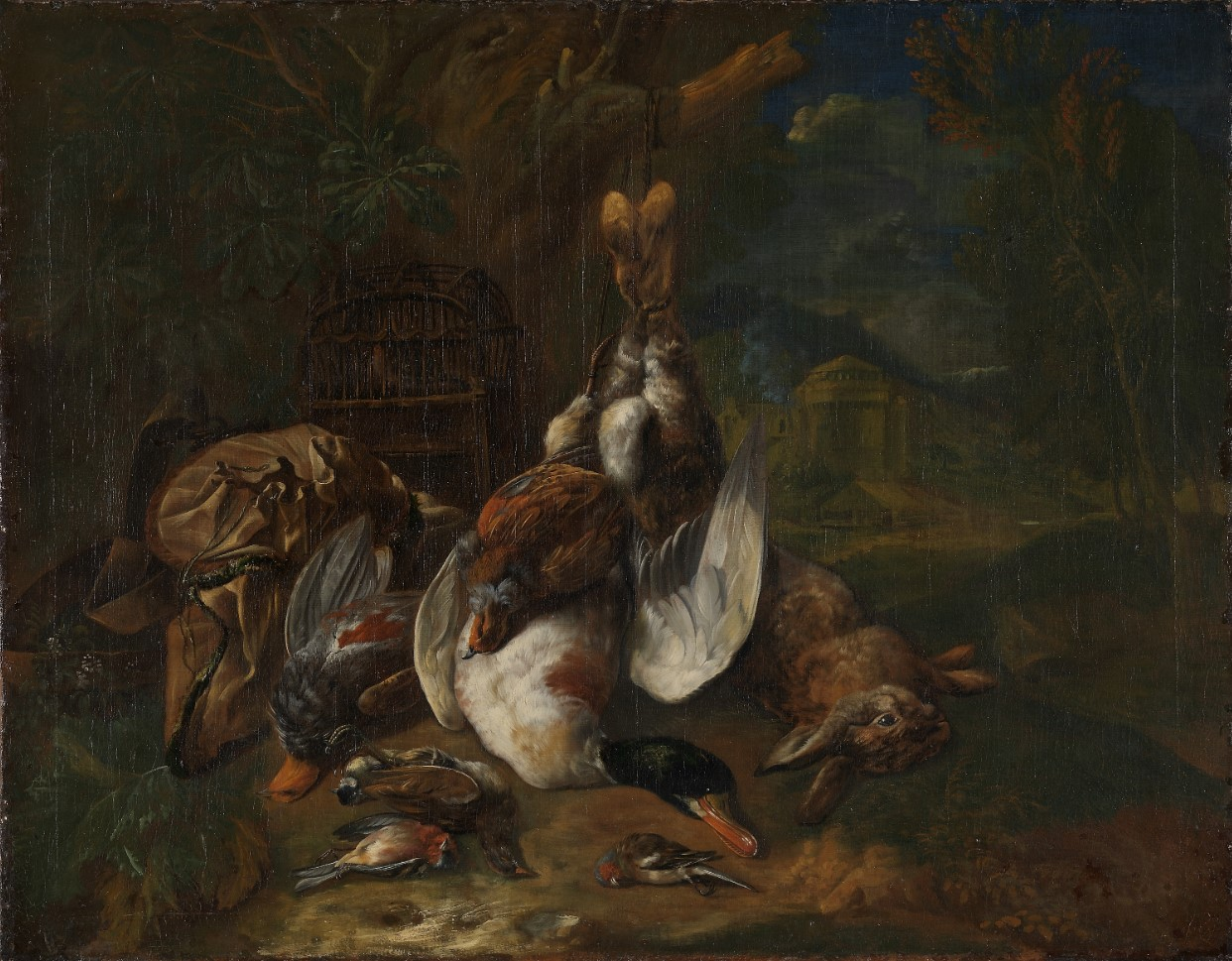
Still life of dead game in a landscape

Bernaert de Bridt, Bernaert de Brit or Bernardus de Bridt (fl 1688 – 1722 in Antwerp), was a Flemish painter and draughtsman who specialized in still lifes. He was also active as a brewer. He is particularly known for his still lifes of dead game, hunting pieces, live animals, sumptuous still lifes and genre scenes with a prominent still life component. He was active in Antwerp.

== Life ==
Nothing is known about Bernaert de Bridt's birth and early years. He is first recorded when he registered as a master of the Antwerp Guild of St. Luke in the guild year running from 18 September 1688 to 18 September 1689. He is documented in the records of the Antwerp Guild until the guild year running from 18 September 1721 to 18 September 1722. The Guild records also state that on 10 April 1722 he paid 'his living death duties' ('syn levende doodtschult').

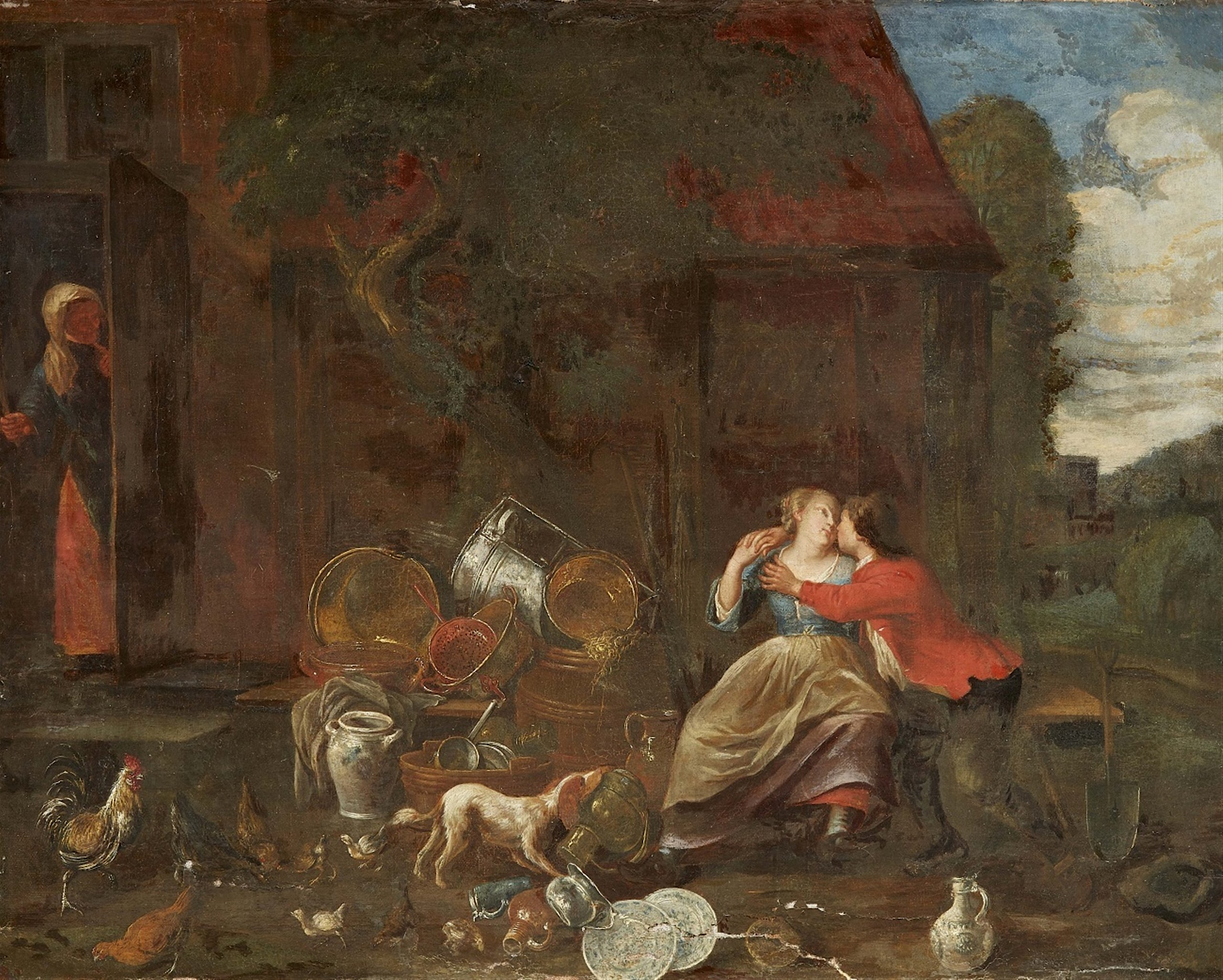
Young couple and old woman by a cottage

De Bridt was also active as a brewer. In 1717 he was elected the dean of the Antwerpse brouwersnatie (Antwerp nation of brewers), the organisation representing the interests of the brewers in Antwerp. He married Joanna Govaerts. The couple had a son called Petrus Bernardus and a daughter called Catharina.

De Bridt died on 8 October 1736 and was buried in the St Walburga Church in Antwerp. This church has since been demolished.

== Work ==
De Bridt's was a still life specialist who painted mainly dead game, hunting trophies, live animals, sumptuous still lifes and a few genre scenes with still life elements.

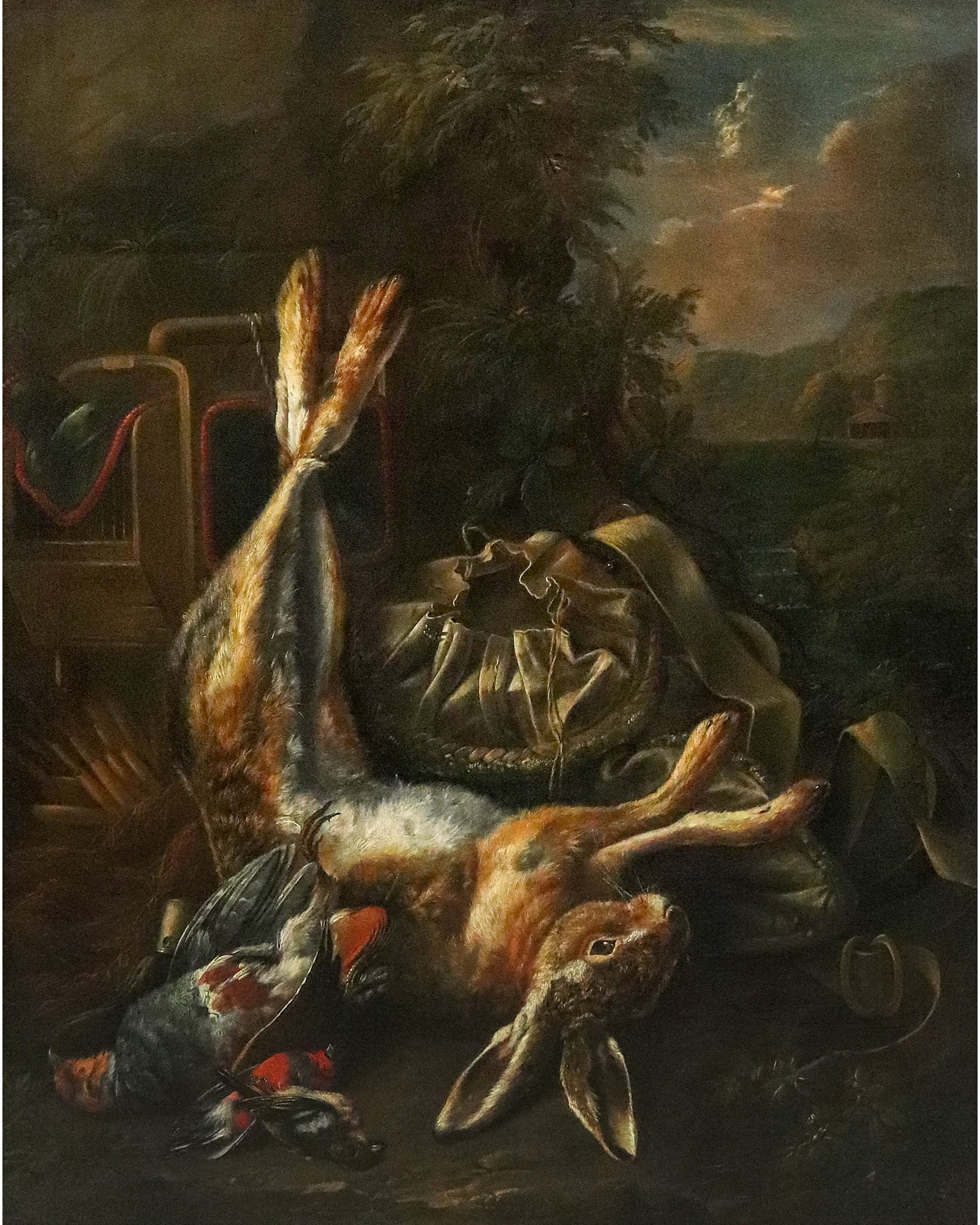
Hunting still life of hung hare and other game

His hunting still lifes often take the form of hunting trophies displayed in a landscape. The scene often also shows some hunting implements, a hunter with a dog, or a cat. It is possible that some of his hunting still lifes were wrongly attributed to Jan Fyt, another Flemish still life painter specialising in this genre. Some sources state that de Bridt may have been a pupil of Fyt. A few of his works have formerly been attributed incorrectly to other specialist painters of dead game such as Pieter Boel and Adriaen de Grijef. Several of his game pieces were created in pairs.

A Still life of vegetables and household goods in a farmyard by de Bridt was recorded in a private collection in St Petersburg. It depicts a man making advances on a young woman cleaning a kettle in the middle of a farmyard. The two are being spied upon by an older lady. It is possible that the man who looks older is the husband of the woman and that the young woman is the maid. Just like the other genre paintings by de Bridt, it contains an important still life component in its careful depiction of a copper kettle, barrel, colander, churn, earthenware jug, stoneware jug, wheelbarrow, cauliflower, artichoke, carrot, leek, hay, pitchfork, spoon, etc.

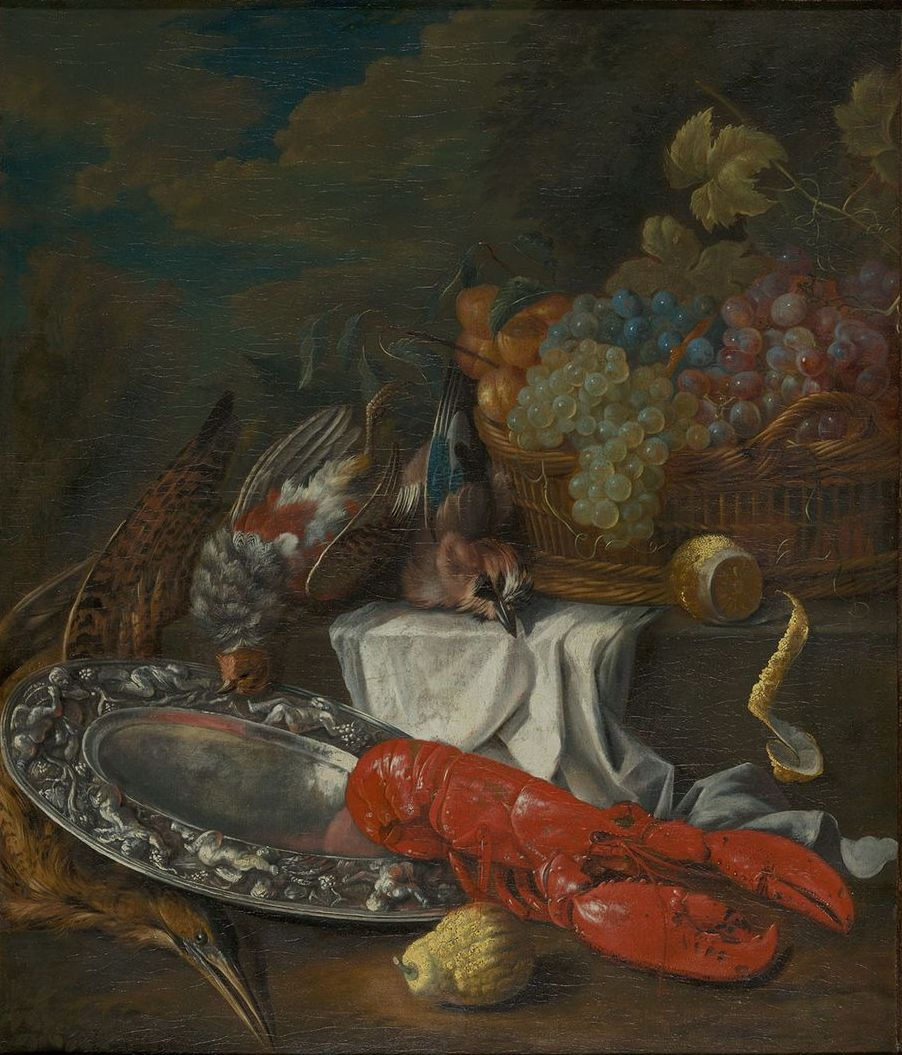
Still life with a lobster

De Bridt also painted still lifes which contained some elements of the pronkstillevens, the sumptuous still lifes, which were popular in Flanders and the Dutch Republic from the 1640s. He may also have included in his game still lifes a vanitas meaning, i.e. a reflection on the vanity (futility) of all human and worldly undertakings. Both elements are present in the Still life with a lobster (1699, M – Museum Leuven) which shows the expensive plate and lobster often seen in pronkstillevens. The peeled lemon symbolising the hardships of life and the decaying fruit referencing the inevitable decay and annihilation of all things are stock symbols of 17th century vanitas paintings.
