= Jacob Caproens =

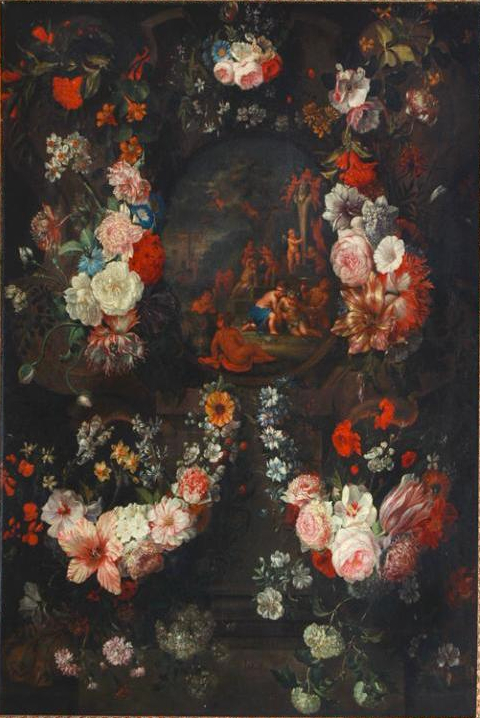
Cartouche still life of flowers around a bacchanal of putti

Jacob Caproens or Jac. Caproens (fl 1675 – 1725, in Antwerp) was a still life painter active in Antwerp in the late 17th and early 18th centuries. Only a handful of works by the artist have been identified. Caproens painted flower and fruit still lifes, garland paintings and banquet still lifes.

== Life ==
Nothing is known about the life of Jacob Caproens. The first mention of the artist is in an 18th-century sale catalogue, which mentions one large flower painting and two large flower and fruit paintings by Caproens. He is believed to have been active in Antwerp. While some art historians have situated the period of his activity between 1675 and 1725 others place it earlier between 1653 and 1672.

== Work ==
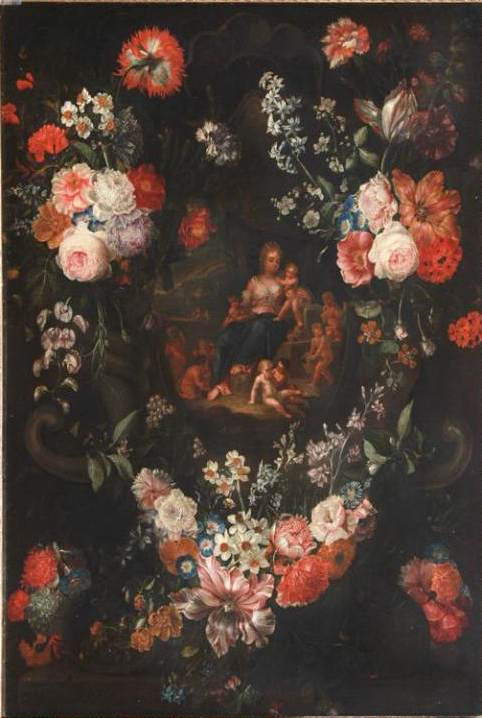
Cartouche still life of flowers around an image of Caritas

Caproens painted flower and fruit still lifes, garland paintings and banquet still lifes. Caproens' signature has been found on at least three large flower and fruit still lifes, which are clearly inspired by Flemish still life painting. His banquet style still lifes depicting food and tableware placed on a table also show the influence of Jan Davidszoon de Heem, a Dutch still life painter who was active in Antwerp from the mid-1630s.

Caproens produced a number of compositions in the genre of 'garland paintings'. Garland paintings are a type of still life invented in early 17th century Antwerp by Jan Brueghel the Elder and subsequently practised by leading Flemish still life painters, and in particular Daniel Seghers. The first paintings in this genre typically showed a flower or, less frequently, fruit garland around a devotional image or portrait. In the later development of the genre, the devotional image was replaced by other subjects such as portraits, mythological subjects and allegorical scenes.

Garland paintings were usually collaborations between a still life painter who painted the garland and a figure painter who filled the central cartouche with an image. The cartouche in the center of Caproens's garland paintings is filled with religious as well as mythological imagery. A pair of garland paintings entitled Cartouche still life of flowers around an image of Caritas and Cartouche still life of flowers around a bacchanal of putti (Town hall of Braunlage) have respectively a religious and secular cartouche.
