= Gravenkapel =

Medieval chapel in Kortrijk, Belgium

Coordinates: 50.8289°N 3.2676°E

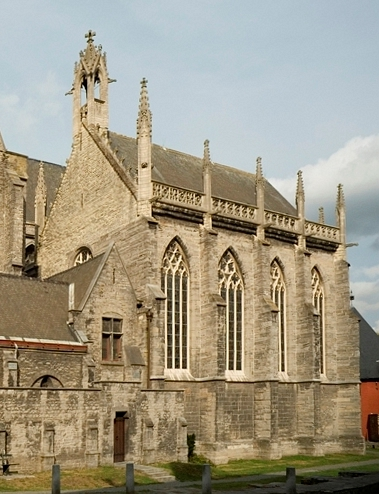
Chapel viewed from the outside

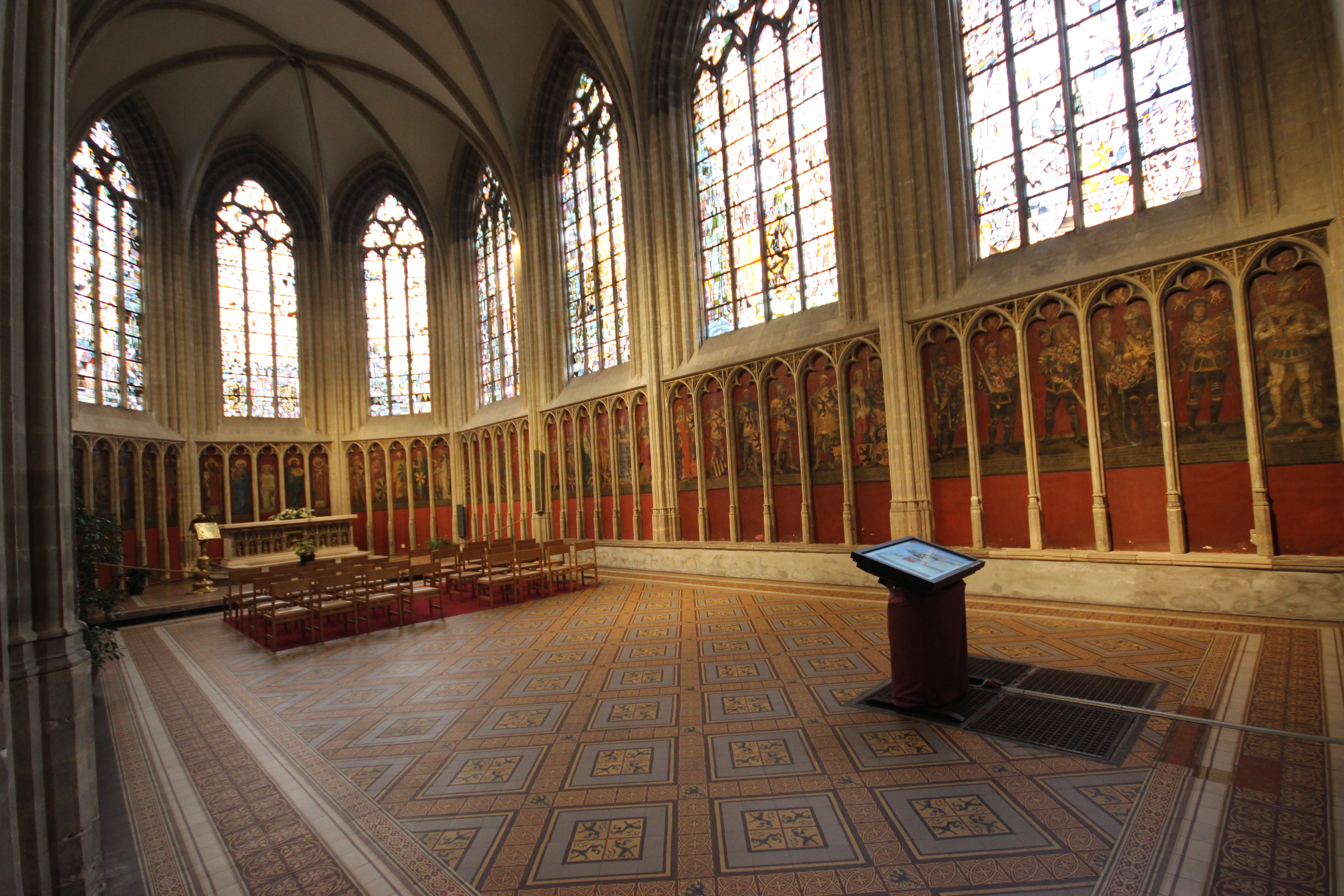
Interior of the Count's Chapel

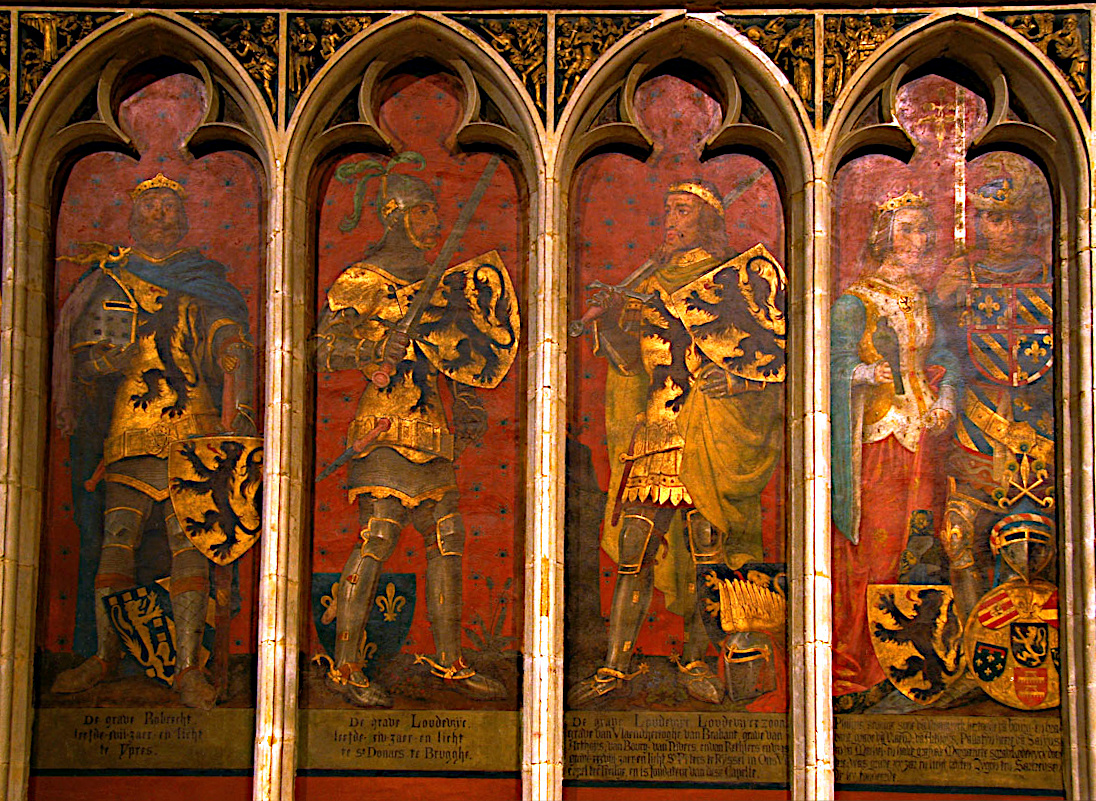
Portraits of all the Counts of Flanders line the walls

The Count's Chapel (Gravenkapel in Dutch) is a medieval chapel in the historic city centre of Kortrijk, Belgium. It is located next to the Church of Our Lady. It was built under Louis II, Count of Flanders as a mausoleum to the Counts of Flanders and a shrine to Saint Catherine. The Count's Chapel was finished around 1374.

== Features ==
- Portraits of the Counts of Flanders

All niches are ornate and were successively decorated with portraits of each count of Flanders. It is thought that Jan van Hasselt painted the first series of portraits, from the legendary Liederic de Buc to Louis II, the founder of the chapel. The effigies of the successors of Louis II were painted by Melchior Broederlam in 1407. The authors of the next portraits, until Emperor Charles V, are unknown.

- Statue of Saint Catherine

White marble statue carved by André Beauneveu.

- Decorations of the niche spandrels.
