= Pietro de Lignis =

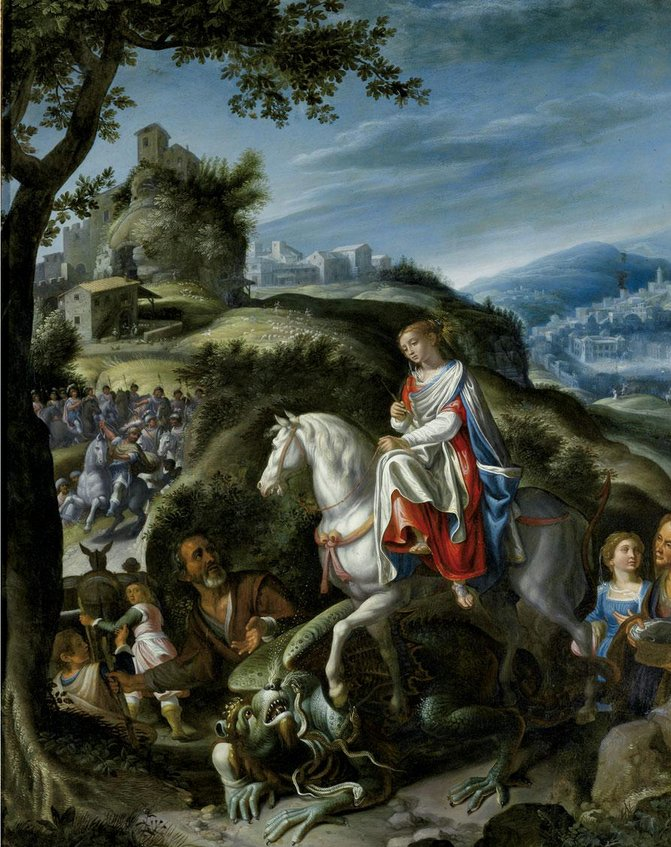
St Margaret tramples the dragon

Pietro de Lignis or Pieter van den Houte (c. 1577 in Mechelen – 6 April 1627 in Rome) was a Flemish painter who after training in Flanders spent his known career in Rome. He is mainly known for his religious compositions executed in a late Mannerist style.

== Life ==
Pietro de Lignis was born as Pieter van den Houte in Mechelen where he likely received his initial artistic training. He is recorded in Rome in 1599 and would live there for the remainder of his life. He was recorded as a member of the prestigious Accademia di San Luca in 1607. In Rome the artist formed part of the growing community of Northern artists in Italy, including Adam Elsheimer, with whom he is believed to have had close contact.

The artist died in Rome on 6 April 1627.

== Work ==
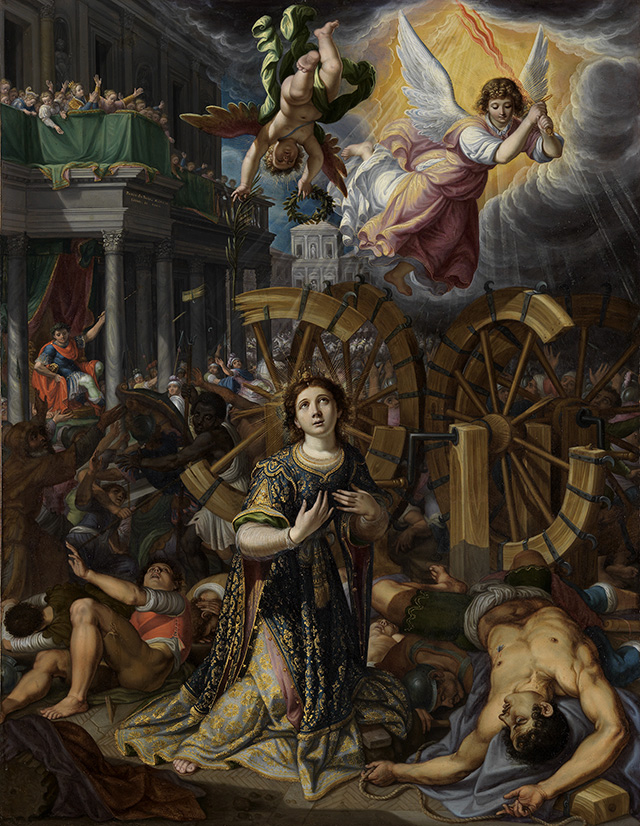
Martyrdom of St. Catherine of Alexandria

Very few works by the artist are known. His work has been reconstructed on the basis of the four known signed pictures by the artist: an Adoration of the Magi in the Museo del Prado, Madrid, which is signed and dated "Pietro de Lignis fiamengo in Roma 1616", The Martyrdom of Saint Catherine of Alexandria (Sotheby's 25 May 1988, lot 126), signed 'Pietro lignis', The Virgin swaddling the Infant Jesus (Christie's 19 April 2007, New York, lot 247) signed 'Pietro du Boi', and Saints Praxede and Potentian with the martyrs (Private Collection), signed 'Pietro Dubois'. The variety of signatures reflects the various translations of the artist's Flemish family name 'van den Houte', which means 'of the Wood': 'Pietro du Bois' (French translation) and 'Pietro Lignis' (Latin translation).

The artist painted religious subject matter, often set in a landscape. Many of his works are executed on copper.

De Lignis' style recalls that of other northern artists who were active in Rome at the time he was residing in the city. His landscapes are reminiscent of Paul Bril and his detailed painting technique demonstrates a knowledge of Adam Elsheimer's works as well as Carlo Saraceni's small paintings on copper.

The gentle rhythm of his compositions and smooth brushwork are the main characteristics of his technique.
