= François Xaver Henri Verbeeck =

Flemish painter

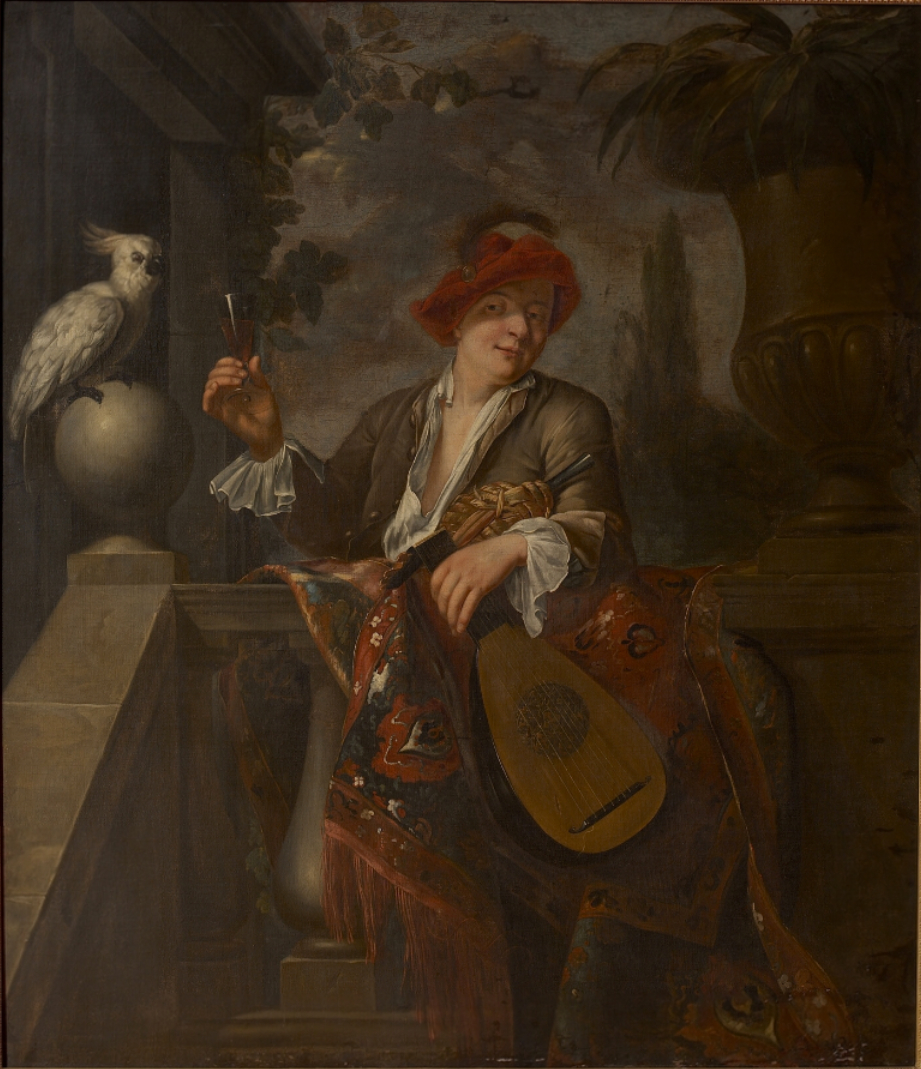
A musician

François Xaver Henri Verbeeck or Frans Verbeeck (Antwerp, baptized on 21 February 1686 – Antwerp, 28 May 1755) was a Flemish painter known mainly for his genre scenes and paintings of merry and gallant companies.

== Life ==
Details about the life of François Xaver Henri Verbeeck are scarce. He was baptized in Antwerp on 21 February 1686 as the son of Alexander Verbeeck and Anna de Goos. His father died young. His mother and stepfather Michiel Mettepenningen let him start his artistic training as a pupil of Jan Baptist de Bie on 24 March 1701. He became a master in the Antwerp Guild of Saint Luke in 1709–1710. He was dean of the Painter's Chamber of the Guild of Saint Luke in 1725–1726, 1733–1734 and 1746–1747.

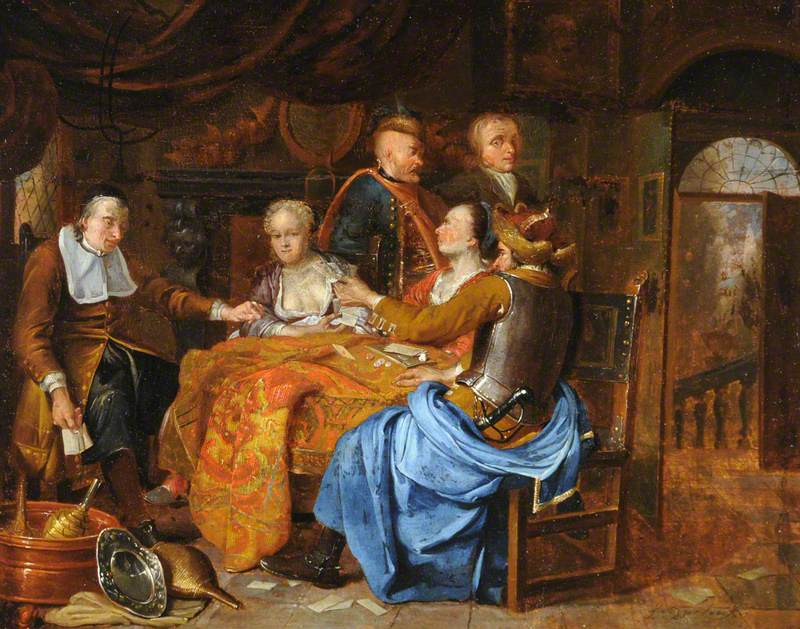
Card players

He married Maria Catharina Casteels on 5 August 1719. The couple had two sons and two daughters. Two of his daughters were painters. One of his brothers was appointed titular bishop by the Archbishop-Elector of Cologne and was also a sculptor.

He was active in Antwerp between 1710 and 1755.

== Work ==
François Xaver Henri Verbeeck was active as a genre and portrait painter. He was known for his merry company paintings depicting gallant groups enjoying themselves at drink, play or music playing. He also created a large merry company scene of the Antwerp guild of fencers which contains a portrait of J. B Vermoelen, the abbot of Saint Michael's Abbey and portraits of the members of the guild. He is regarded as a follower of Balthasar van den Bossche in his genre scenes and merry company paintings.

The genre works of Verbeeck are mostly in the style of merry companies and typically depict a group of men and woman engaged in music making, drinking and card playing. Some of the scenes depict gallant gatherings. He also painted tronie style portraits of single musicians, drinkers, cooks and servants.

Some of the merry company paintings are allegorical and represent one of the senses. Examples are The Sense of Taste; Elegant company eating and drinking and The Sense of Hearing; elegant company making music in an interior (auctioned at Christie's on 6 November 2002 in Amsterdam, lot 34).

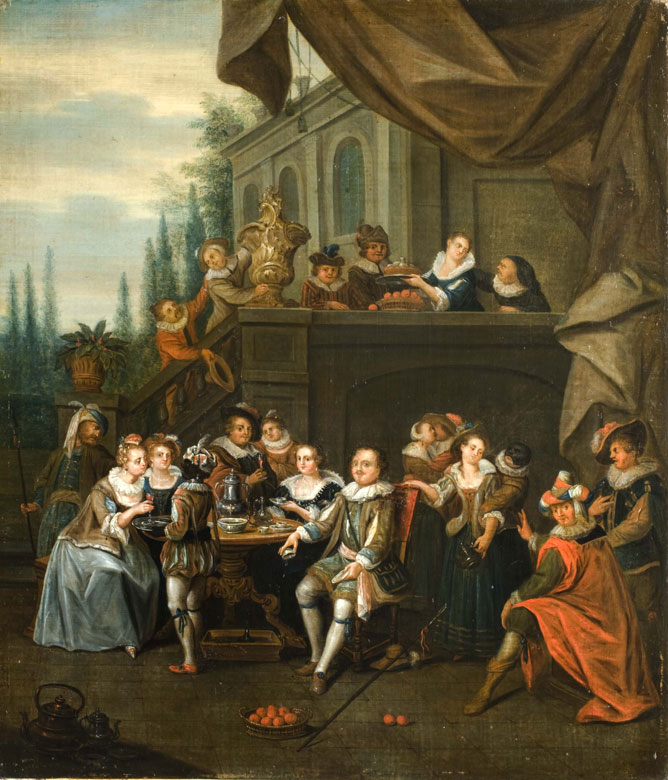
Elegant company at table on a castle terrace

Other of his merry company paintings are believed to convey some moral message through the use of certain symbols. The Card players (Guernsey Museum & Art Gallery) depicts a scene of a company of two women and four men. Two of the men and the women are sitting around a table playing cards. The composition may be a criticism of the vice of gambling, which leads to an individual's downfall. One of the players in the composition is a soldier, who has left his sword vulnerable and unguarded. There may also be some plot afoot involving the two men not participating in the card game, possibly referring to an historic event or proverb well known at the time. There is a feeling of things getting out of hand through the discarded empty bottles and the playing cards strewn on the floor.
