= Engelbert van Siclers =

Flemish painter, known for Ghent cityscapes

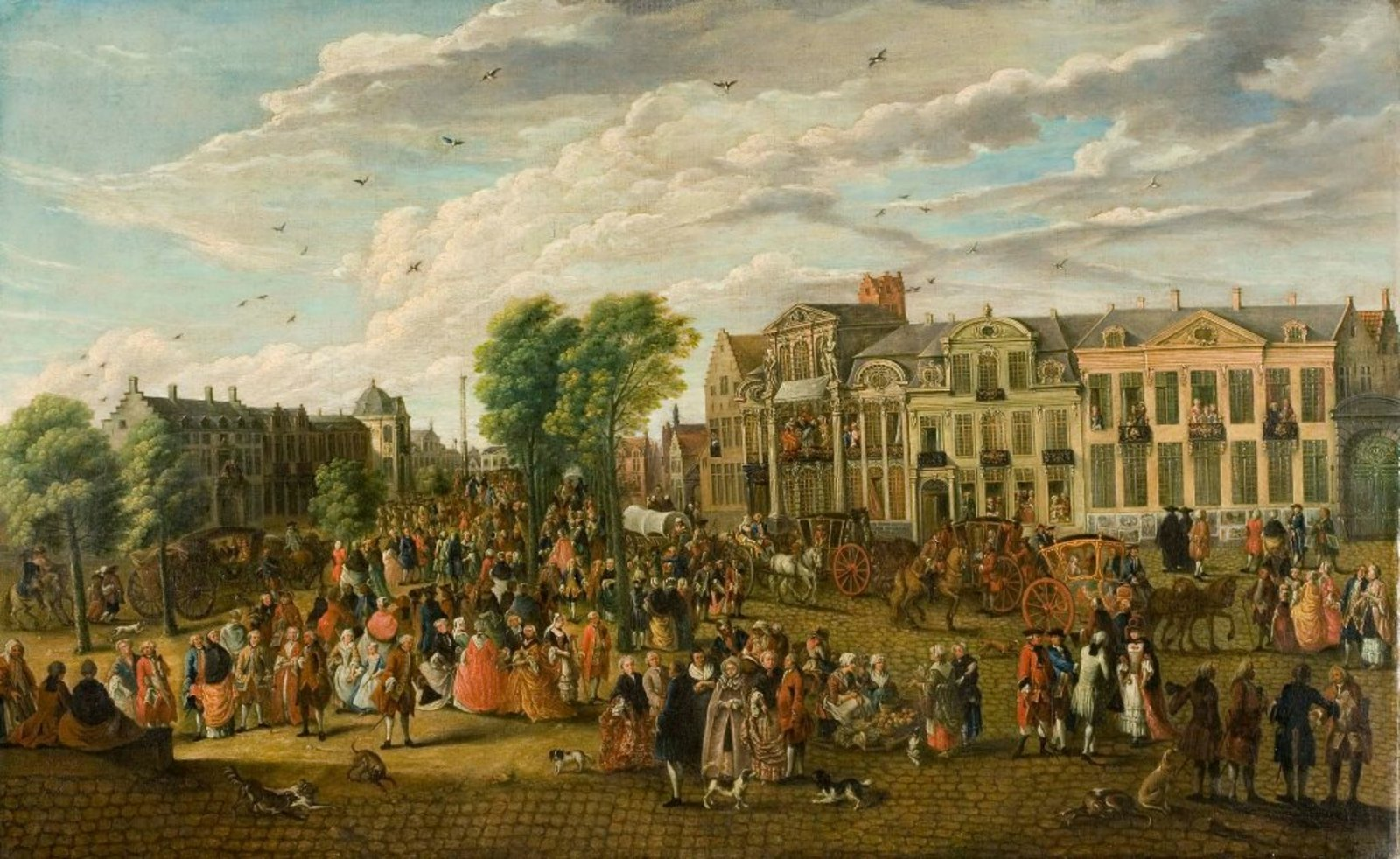
De Kouter in Ghent in 1763

Engelbert van Siclers or Engelbert Lieven van Siclers (Ghent, 6 June 1725 – 24 June 1796) was a Flemish painter who is known for his cityscapes of Ghent.

== Life ==
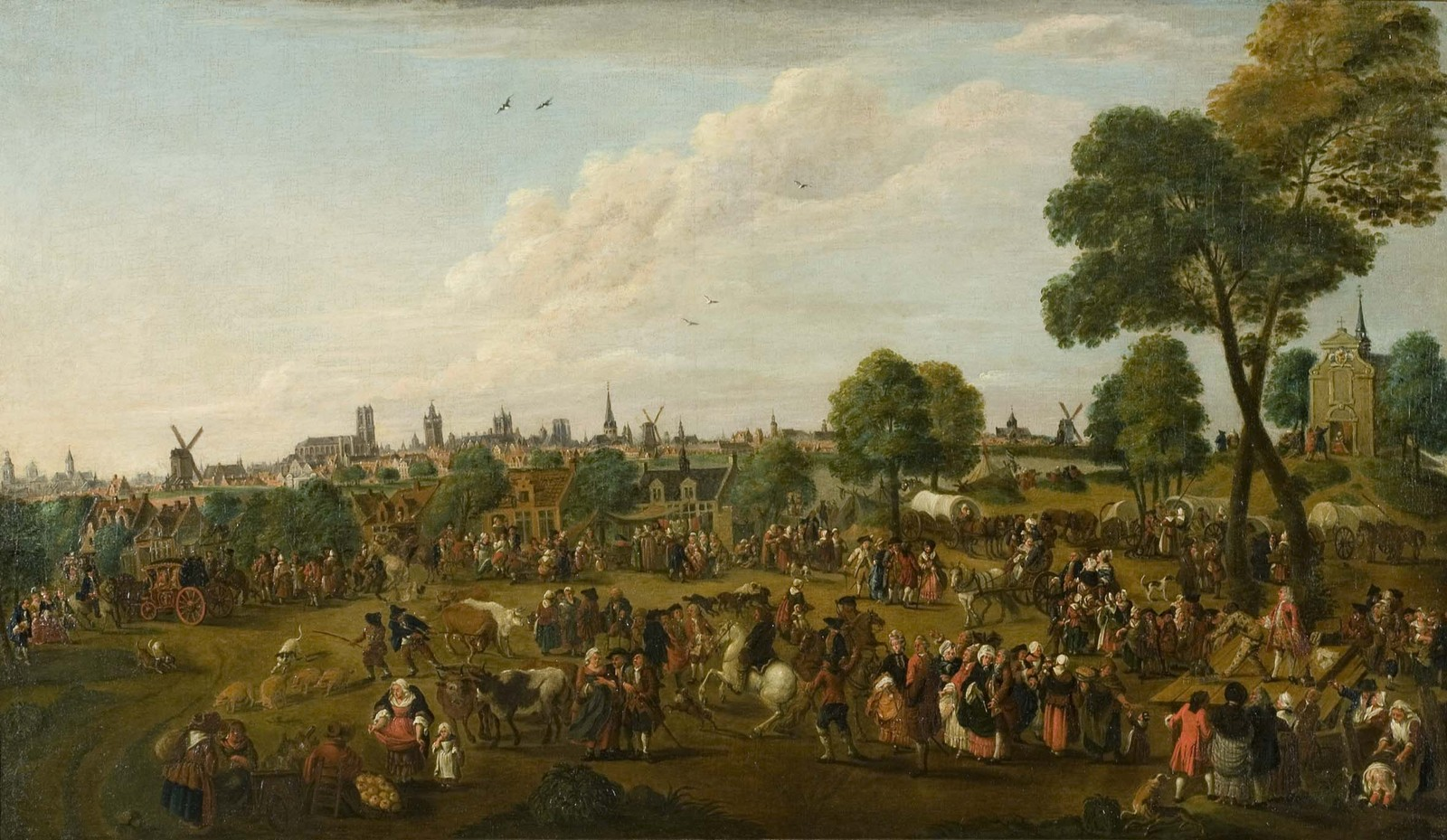
The 9 May market in Sint-Amandsberg

Engelbert van Siclers was born in Ghent as the son of Jacques van Siclers, lawyer on the Council of Flanders and Anne Odevaere, whose father, Martin Odevaere, had also been a lawyer on the same council. The Siclers were an old aristocratic family, which was of Lombard-Jewish ancestry and had played a prominent role in Ghent in the 14th to 16th century.

Engelbert studied law and practised painting only as an amateur as he was independently wealthy. He did not join the local Guild of St Luke. It is in the capacity of "retiree" that he joined in 1780 the Ghent assembly of notables known as the Collace. He was also a deacon of the fishmongers' guild.

He was a faithful contributor to the Ghent Academy for drawing, painting and architecture, where in 1782 and again in 1790 he was the patron of a pupil enrolled in drawing classes. He married Anne Bernardine Mechelynck.

== Work ==
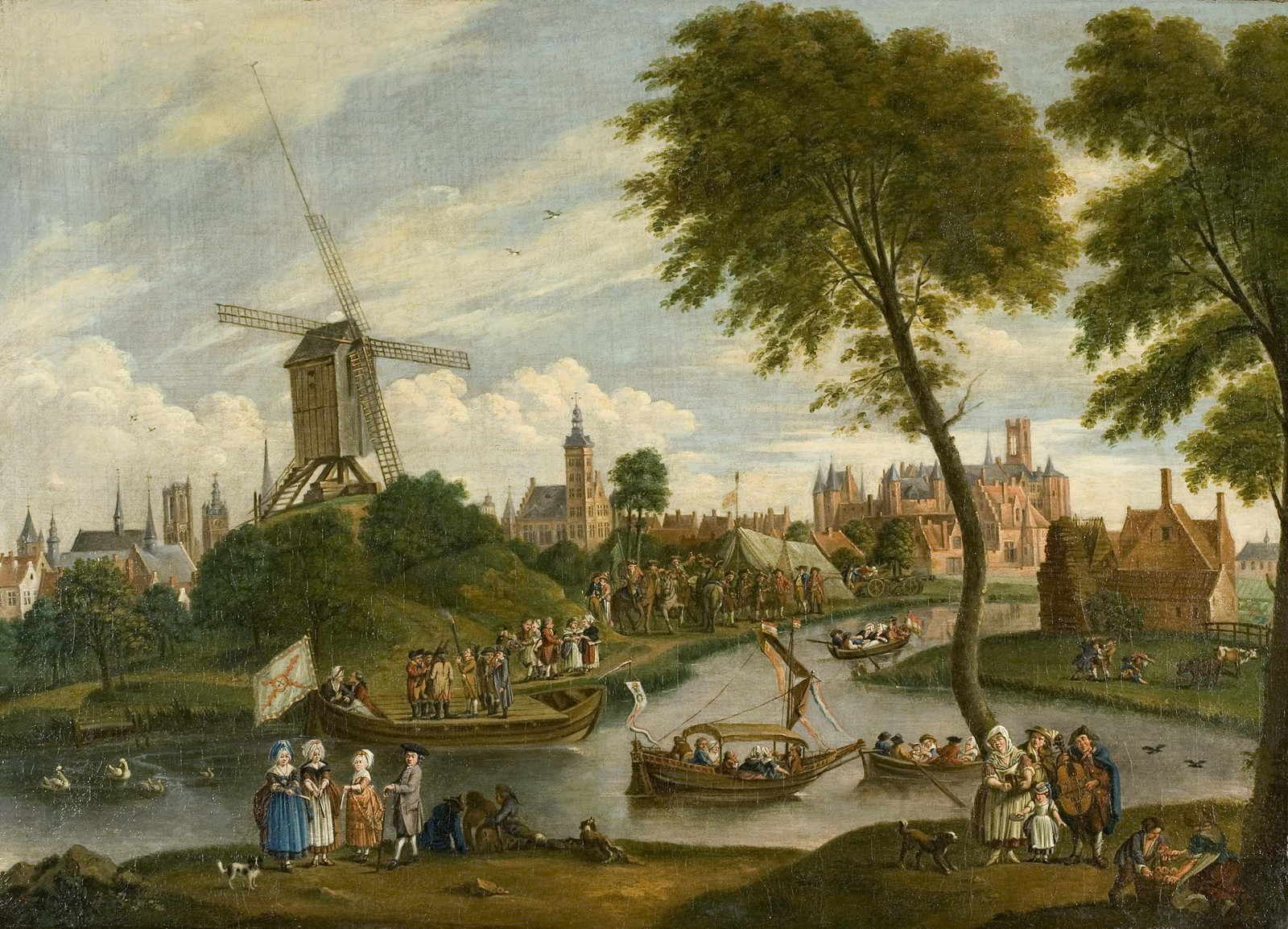
King's shoot of the St Anthony guild

Engelbert van Siclers created mainly paintings and drawings of city views, especially from Ghent. He excelled at arranging groups of figures in festive clothes. His works are important as documents of the history of Ghent. His works are preserved in the library of the University of Ghent. Four paintings by van Siclers, one signed and two monogrammed "S," are in the Ghent City Museum.
