= Cornelis van Huynen =

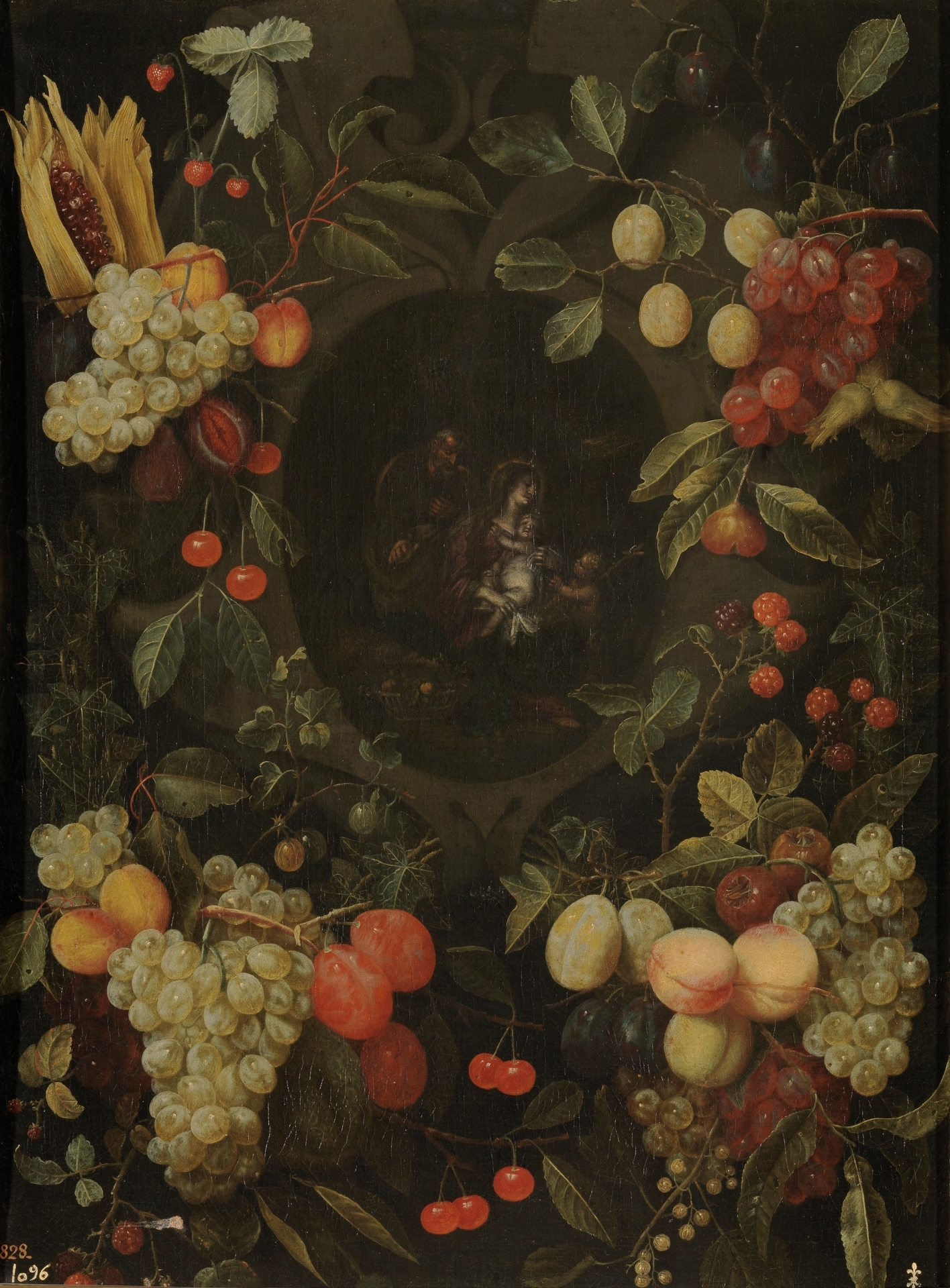
Garland of fruits with the Holy Family

Cornelis van Huynen (died 1703) was a Flemish still life painter who is known for his fruit and garland paintings. He was active in Antwerp where he had trained with the prominent still life painter Joris van Son.

== Life ==
Information about the life of Cornelis van Huynen is sketchy. The place and date of his birth are unknown. He is first recorded when in the guild year 1654/1655 he was registered at the Guild of Saint Luke of Antwerp as a pupil of the prominent still life painter Joris van Son. He became pupil of van Son in the same year as Frans van Everbroeck, who also became a still life painter. He became a master in the local Guild in the guild year 1661–1662.

Van Huynen was active in Antwerp until 1703. His death dues were paid to the Guild in 1703, which indicates he died that year.

== Work ==
The known oeuvre of van Huynen is very limited. There only signed works are two garland paintings conserved in the Prado Museum. In addition there are two other garland paintings attributed to the artist in the National Museum in Warsaw, which were previously attributed to Catarina Ykens (II). Two pendant works representing garlands of fruit auctioned at Bonhams & Butterfields (San Francisco, California) on 14 May 2003, lot 1026 as attributed to Frans Ykens have been attributed to Cornelis van Huynen by F G Meijer

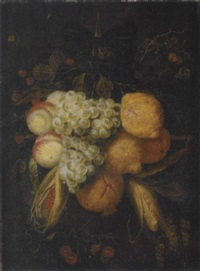
Still life with a swag of grapes, lemons, peaches and other fruits

Van Huynen's works fall into two categories: garlands of fruit and garland paintings. He must also have painted garlands of flowers as there is a record of a sale of a work in this genre by the art dealer Forchondt during his lifetime in 1671. His works demonstrate a great affinity with the creations of his master Joris van Son, although the models used in his figures demonstrate a knowledge of the work of Antony van Dyck.

The majority of his still lifes fall into the category of 'garland paintings'. Garland paintings are a type of still life invented in early 17th century Antwerp and whose earliest practitioner was Jan Brueghel the Elder. Paintings in this genre typically show a flower or, less frequently, fruit garland around a devotional image or portrait. Garland paintings were usually collaborations between a still life and a figure painter. Paintings in this genre typically show a flower or, less frequently, fruit garland around a devotional image or portrait. In the later development of the genre, the devotional image is replaced by other subjects such as portraits, mythological subjects and allegorical scenes.

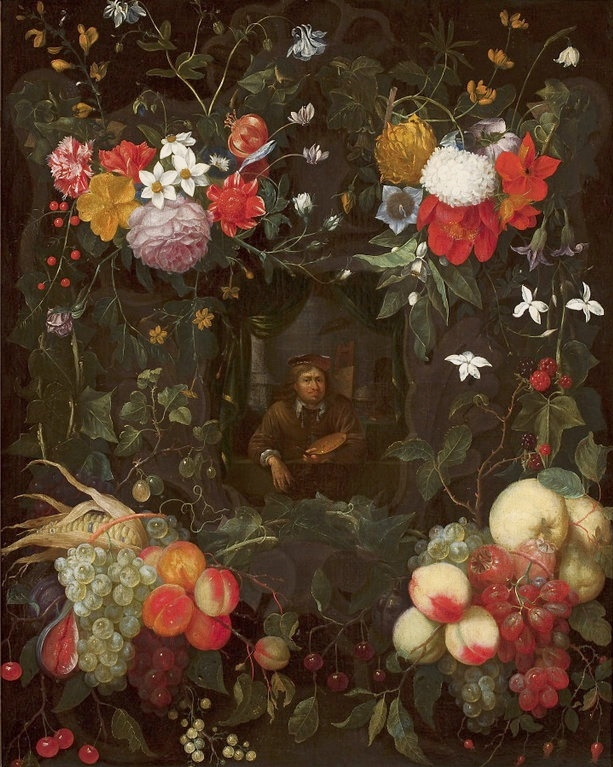
Portrait of a painter surrounded by a garland

The two garland paintings in the Prado have a devotional theme in the middle of the garland. The two garland paintings in the National Museum in Warsaw contain respectively portraits of a painter holding a palette and a woman reading. Like his master van Son these garland paintings consist of fruits or a combination of fruit and flowers with the upper part being made up of flowers and the lower part of fruit or vice versa. The fruits and flowers in these compositions are bunched together in groups that are attached to sculptural frames.
