= Jan Frans van Son =

Flemish still life painter

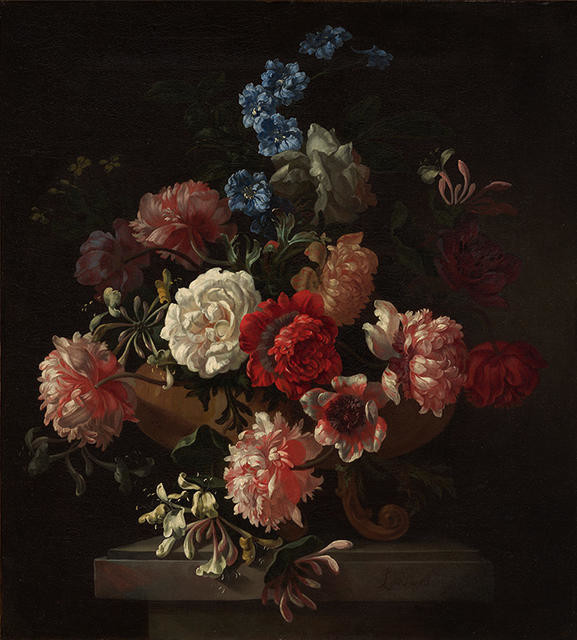
Flowers in a vase

Jan Frans van Son or Frans van Son (Baptized on 16 August 1658, Antwerp – 1701, London) was a Flemish still life painter. The son of the prominent Antwerp still life painter Joris van Son, he trained with another prominent still life artist Jan Pauwel Gillemans the Elder. He left for England at a young age and had a successful career in London. He painted flower pieces, fruit still lifes and banquet still lifes.

== Life ==
Jan Frans van Son was baptised on 16 August 1658 as the son of the painter Joris van Son and Cornelia van Heulem. His father died before Jan Frans reached the age of nine. As a result, Jan Frans trained with the still life artist Jan Pauwel Gillemans the Elder. He travelled to England at a young age, possibly just after Gillemans' death in Antwerp on 12 August 1675.

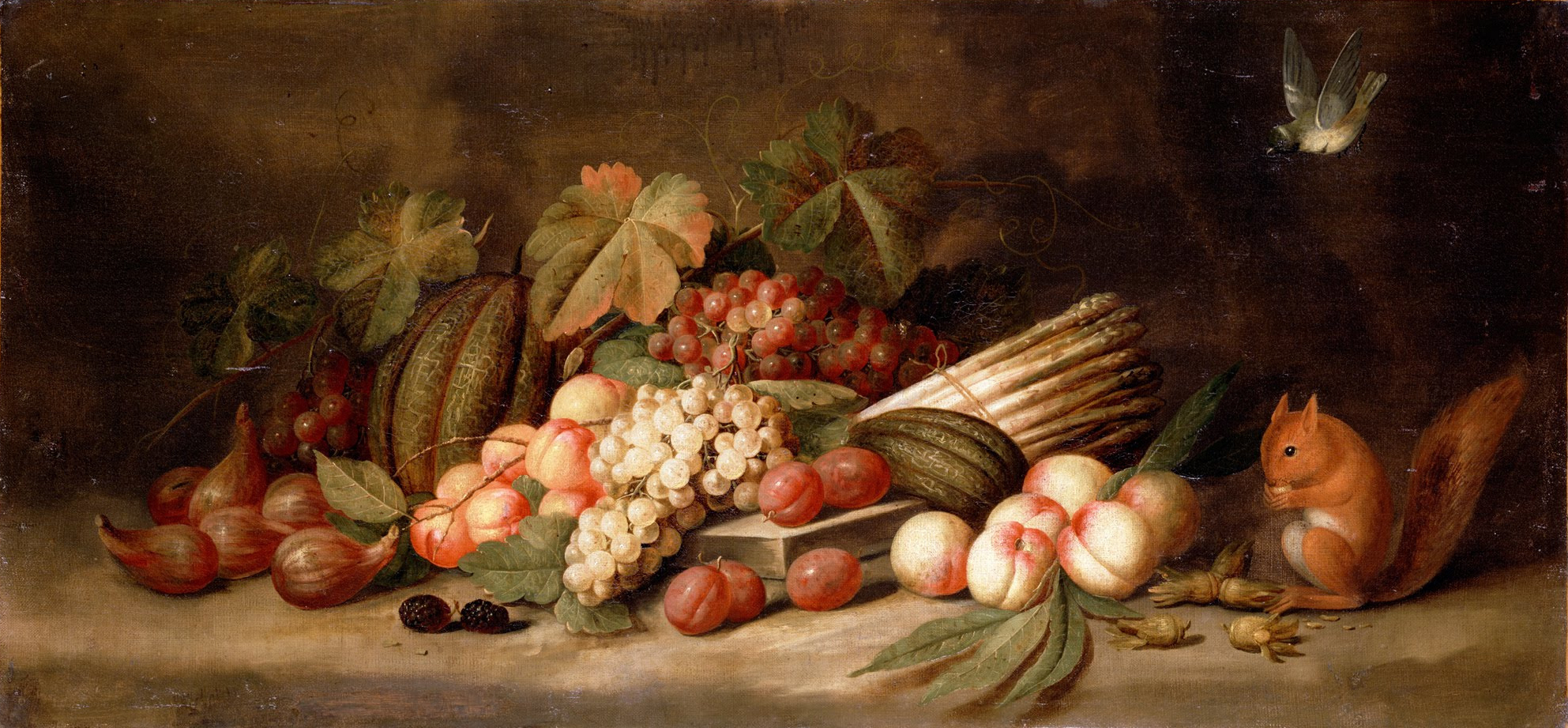
Still Life with Fruit and a Squirrel

He married Elizabeth Harler on 6 May 1684 in the St Marylebone Parish Church in London. The couple had at least five children: Elizabeth born on 25 March 1685, Francis born on 18 October 1686, Bridget born on 17 October 1688, Jermin born on 9 April 1691 and John born on 12 December 1693. Most of their children did young: Elizabeth was buried on 12 March 1687, Francis as well as Jermyn on 29 August 1691, and Bridget on 8 December 1700.

His wife was a niece of the king's serjeant-painter Robert Streater. His marriage thus brought him powerful connections and a lucrative patronage. He was also patronised by Charles Robartes, earl of Radnor, who reportedly had a large collection of van Son's paintings in his house in St. James's Square.

The artist is recorded as living in St Martin in the Fields, New Street Ward, Long Acre North in 1693–94. He may have lived at this location before and after that period. After lived in Long Acre, he finally moved to St. Albans Street, St. James's.

The death date of Jan Frans van Son is not known. It is likely he is identical to the Francis Vansson who was buried on 17 January 1701 St. James's Picadilly, London. His death followed shortly that of his daughter Bridget. The 18th century Dutch biographer Jacob Campo Weyerman reported that van Son died out of grief over the loss of his daughter.

It was believed earlier that he died after 1704 on the basis of this date appearing on a work attributed to him in the Palais des Beaux-Arts of Lille. On stylistic grounds it is no longer believed he painted that painting.

== Work ==
Jan Frans van Son was a still life painter who painted flower pieces, fruit still lifes, banquet still lifes and garland paintings. He signed his works "J van Son" or "JF van Son".

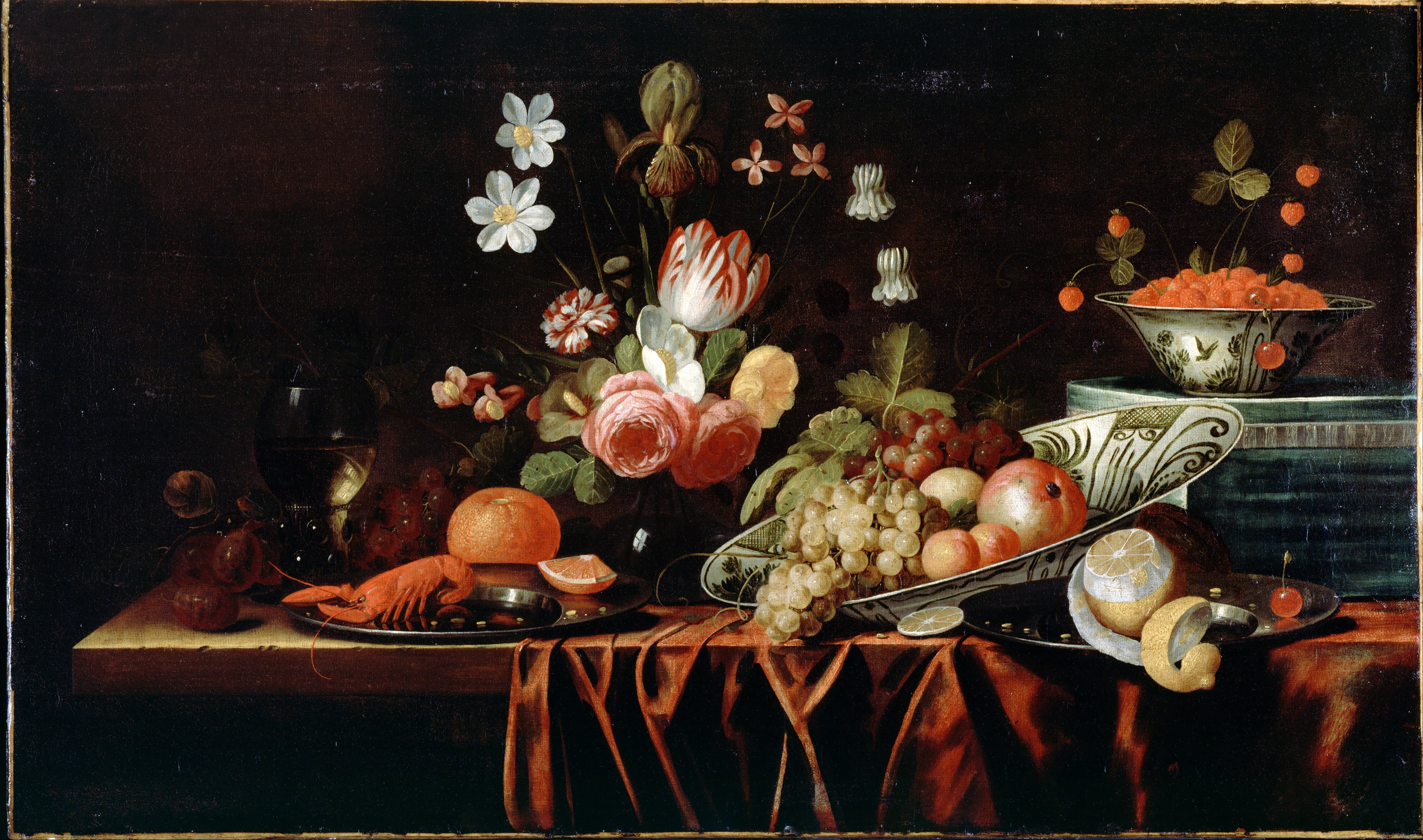
Still life with fruit, flowers and crayfish

His style is unlike that of his father as he did not train with him. His style is more in line with that of his teacher Jan Pauwel Gillemans the Elder and some paintings formerly attributed to a follower of Jan Pauwel Gillemans the Elder have been re-attributed to him. This includes three still lifes at the Dulwich Picture Gallery. These works likely were part of a larger set of interior decoration and were probably intended as overdoors and as an overmantel.

When Weyerman moved to London, van Son had recently died. Weyerman took over his unfinished flower paintings and sketches and finished them.
