= Joris van Son =

Flemish painter (1623–1667)

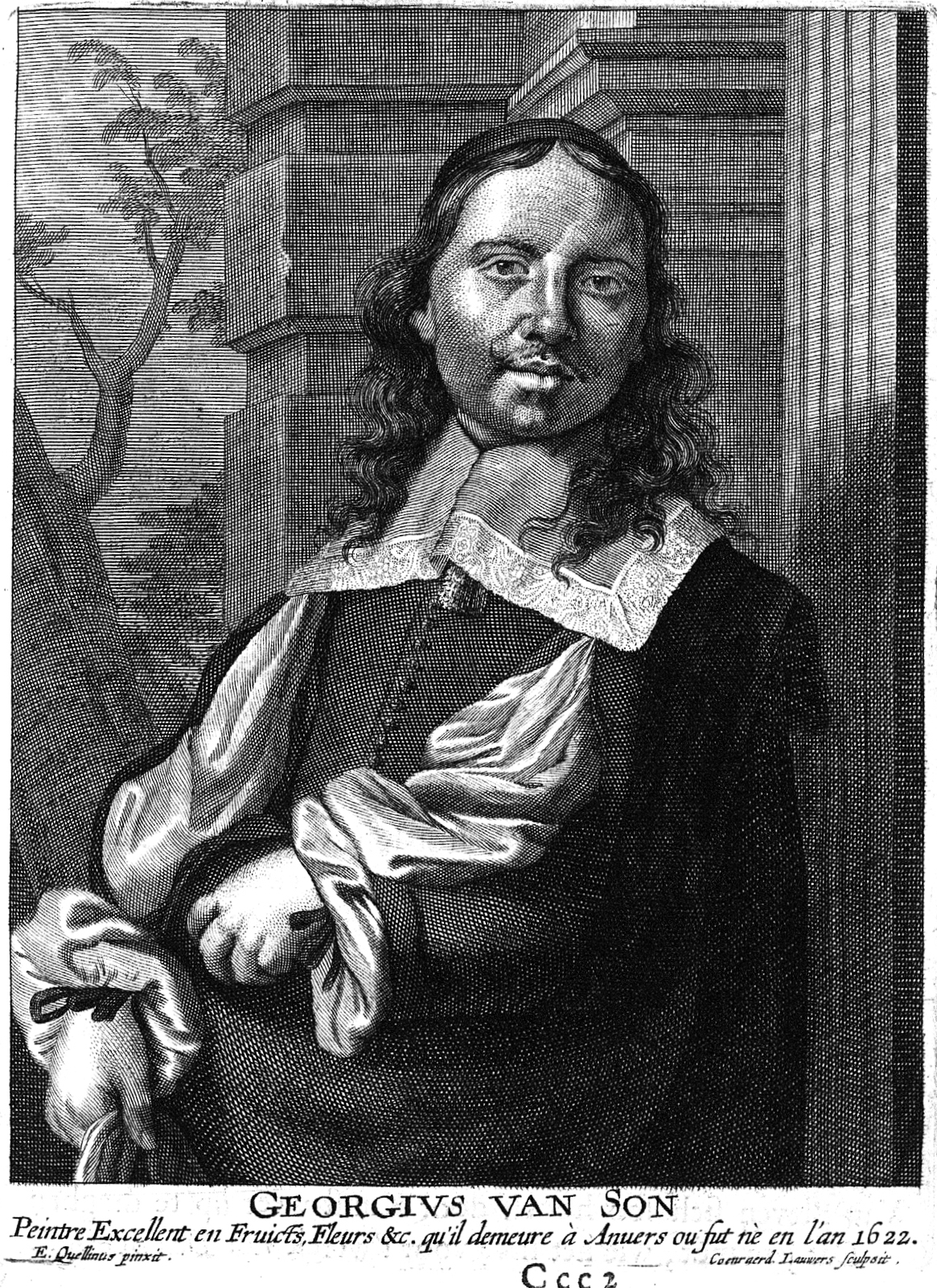
- Joris van Son, engraved after a design by Erasmus Quellinus II
- Born: 1623, Antwerp
- Died: 1667 (aged 43–44) , Antwerp
- Known for: Still life painting

Joris van Son or Georg van Son (baptized 24 September 1623 – buried 25 June 1667 in Antwerp) was a Flemish still life painter who worked in a number of sub-genres but is principally known for his still lifes of fruit. He also painted flowers, banquets, vanitas still lifes and pronkstillevens. He is known to have painted fish still lifes representing the Four Elements, and also collaborated with figure artists on 'garland paintings', which typically represent a devotional image framed by a fruit or flower garland.

== Life ==
Joris van Son was born in Antwerp, the son of Joris and Catharina Formenois and was baptized on 24 September 1623 in the Antwerp Cathedral. It is not clear with which artist he trained. His work shows a strong influence of Jan Davidszoon de Heem, a Dutch still life painter who was active in Antwerp from the mid-1630s. This may be an indication that van Son studied with de Heem or was an assistant in de Heem's studio and was very familiar with de Heem's work in his formative years. He became a master in Guild of Saint Luke of Antwerp in the guild year 1643/1644.

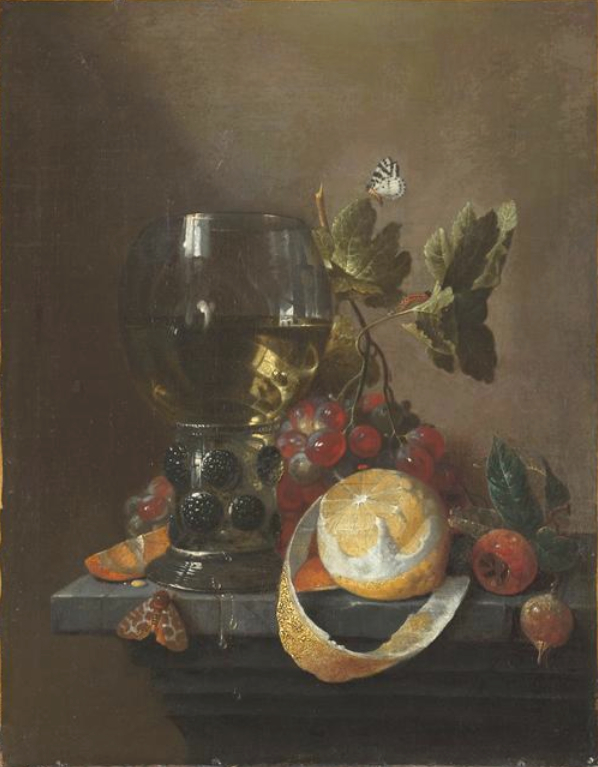
Still life with fruit and a glass on a ledge

In 1647, he became a member of the pious bachelor society, de 'Sodaliteit van de Bejaerde Jongmans', a fraternity for bachelors established by the Jesuit order. This did not stop him from seeking out the company of women. He started a relationship with Cornelia van Heulens. Their relationship produced a daughter, Maria Chatharina, who was born on 3 August 1656. The still life painter Jan Pauwel Gillemans the Elder was her godfather. Not long thereafter, on 22 October 1656, van Son married the mother of his child. Two years later a son, who was named Jan Frans, was born. The last child of the couple, called Maria Chatharina, was baptized on 5 October 1660.

Van Son's work was much appreciated by collectors and his paintings were in the collections of artists such as Victor Wolfvoet and traders such as Geraert van Dorth. The pupils of van Son included Frans van Everbroeck, Jan Pauwel Gillemans the Younger, Cornelis van Huynen, Norbert Montalie and Abraham Herderwijn (Aberam Herderwyn). His son Jan Frans was only nine when he died and was therefore not trained by Joris. Rather, Jan Frans was a pupil of Jan Pauwel Gillemans the Elder. Jan Frans became a still life painter and worked in England.

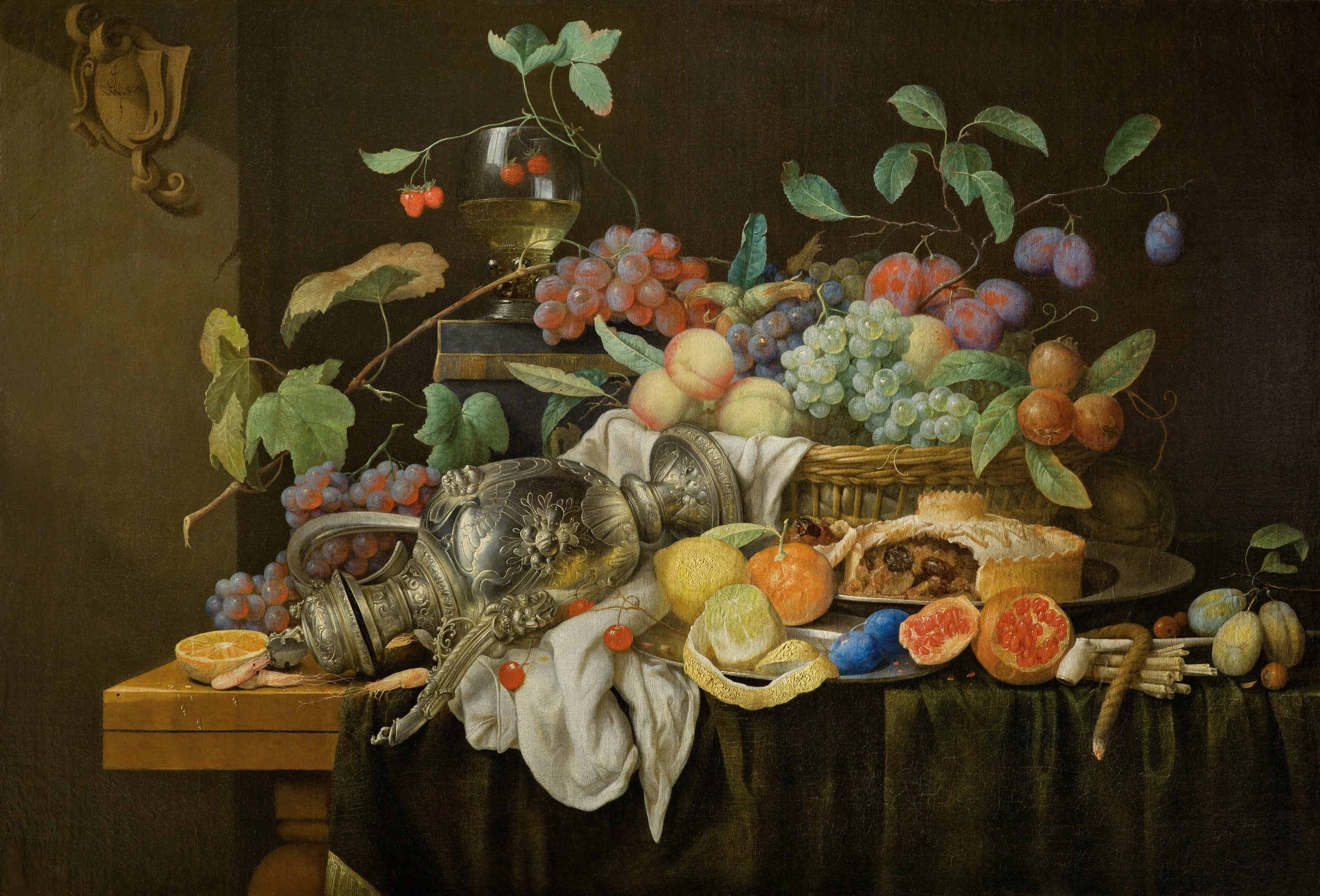
Pronk still life with overturned silver ewer

Van Son suddenly took ill in May 1667 and died prematurely at the age of 44, in his native city of Antwerp, where he was buried on 25 June 1667.

== Work ==
=== General ===
Van Son was a specialist still life painter. He practised many of the sub-genres of still life such as fruit still lifes, flower pieces, banquet still lifes, vanitas still lifes, garland paintings and pronkstillevens, i.e. sumptuous still lifes of luxurious objects. He is known to have painted fish still lifes representing the Four Elements. These showed fish lying on a beach in front of the ocean. The painter Jan van Kessel the Elder later produced similar works. The chronology of his work is not easy to establish as he did not date many of his paintings.

Van Son's still lifes almost always include fruit, often of varieties that are not native but imported. His still lifes are animated by branches of cherries or raspberries, which endow the composition with a great lightness. The objects are distributed on a table or ledge at a level so that an intimacy with the viewer is created.

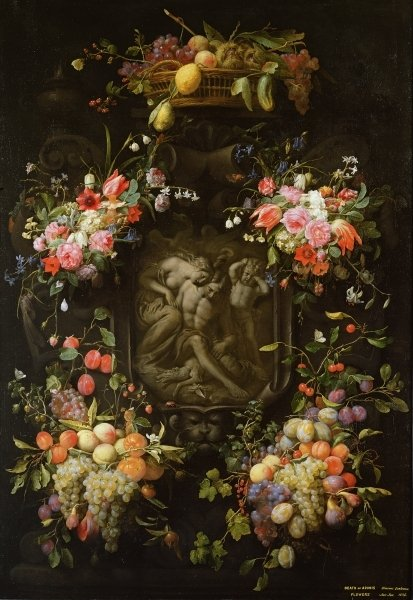
Garland of Fruit and Flowers with the Death of Adonis

=== Garland paintings ===
Another important portion of van Son's output falls into the category of 'garland paintings'. Garland paintings are a type of still life invented in early 17th-century Antwerp by Jan Brueghel the Elder and subsequently practised by leading Flemish still life painters, in particular Daniel Seghers. Paintings in this genre typically show a flower or, less frequently, fruit garland around a devotional image or portrait. In the later development of the genre, the devotional image is replaced by other subjects such as portraits, mythological subjects and allegorical scenes.

Garland paintings were usually collaborations between a still life and a figure painter. Not all of van Son's collaborators on his garland paintings have been identified but they are known to have included Erasmus Quellinus II, Pieter Boel, Frans Wouters, Gysbrecht Thys and Jan den Duyts. His collaborators painted the figure or figures inside the cartouche while van Son painted the fruit and flower garland. The Garland of Fruit and Flowers with the Death of Adonis is an example of a collaboration with Erasmus Quellinus. The central images in his garland paintings were devotional as well as secular.

Van Son painted garland paintings with garlands of flowers and of fruits and occasionally a combination of the two with the upper part being made up of flowers and the lower part of fruit or vice versa. The fruits and flowers in these compositions are bunched together in groups that are attached to sculptural frames. His flower garlands reveal the influence of Daniel Seghers, although conceptually his work is closer to that of Jan Davidsz de Heem who is presumed by some art historians to have been his master. The light in van Son's work is softer than that in de Heem's work. Van Son was particularly skilled in the rendering of the physical qualities of the skin of fruits, as is evident in the hairiness of the peaches in his compositions. An example of a devotional garland painting is The Virgin with the Child inside a festoon of fruit (Prado Museum).

=== Vanitas still lifes ===
Van Son is also known for his vanitas still lifes, a genre of still lifes which offers a reflection on the meaninglessness of earthly life and the transient nature of all earthly goods and pursuits.

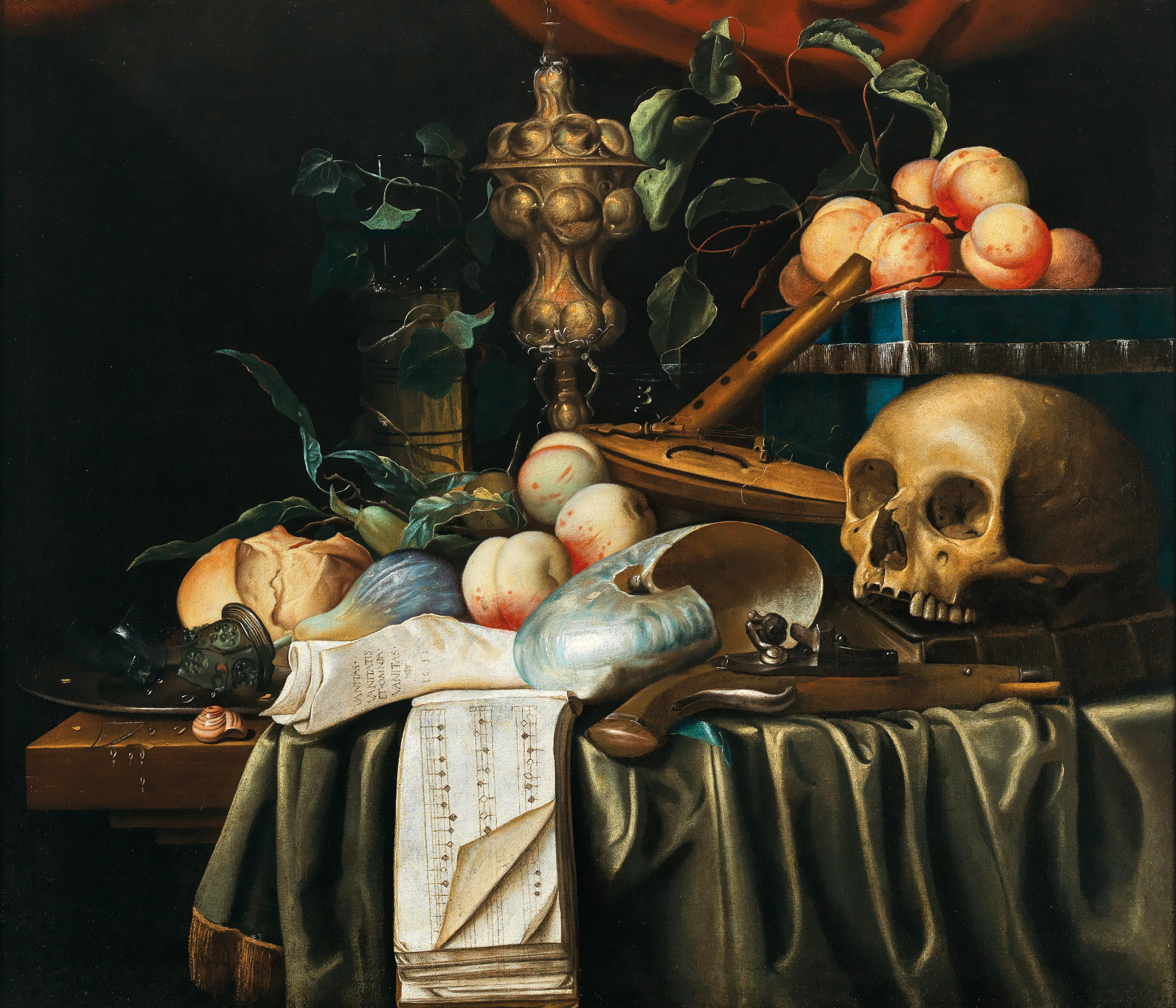
A vanitas still-life

Vanitas still lifes of van Son are listed for the first time in 1666 in Antwerp. Some of his garland paintings are vanitas paintings. This is for example the case with the composition Allegory of Human Life (At Walters Art Museum). This composition contains the typical symbols present in vanitas paintings: a skull, a burning candle and an hourglass. The flowers in high bloom and the butterflies also refer to the fleetingness of things. Another garland painting with vanitas motif is the Three Putti with Vanitas Symbols within a Decorated Cartouche (At Lempertz on 15 November 2014, Cologne, Lot 1072) where the typical symbols of vanitas also appear: a skull, soap bubbles and opulently glittering vases which reference the transience of things and, in particular, of earthly wealth.

A pure vanitas painting is the Vanitas still-life with a skull, a pistol, a lute with broken strings, a flute (At Christie's on 10 December 2004, London lot 59), in which a wide range of vanitas symbols are displayed on a table. On the lower right of the painting are inscribed the words 'Vanitas, Vanitas. Et omnia Vanitas', which refers to the famous line of the Ecclesiastes, which in the Latin version of the bible called the Vulgate 1:2; 12:8 is rendered as Vanitas vanitatum omnia vanitas. In the King James Version it is translated "Vanity of vanities, all is vanity".

=== Pronkstillevens ===
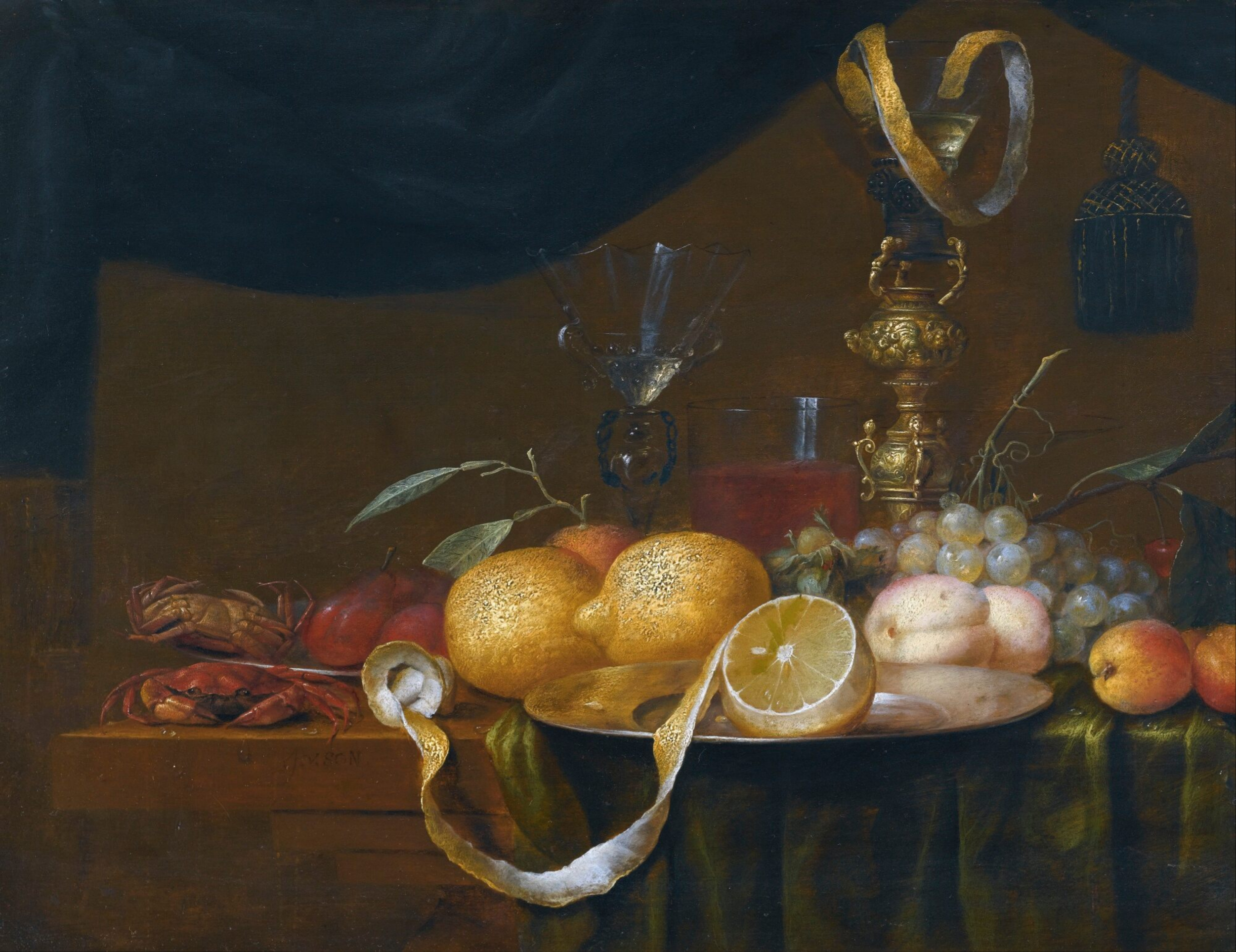
Still life with crabs, fruit and a partly peeled lemon, with glasses behind

A large portion of his output consists of pronkstillevens, the sumptuous still lifes that were popular in Flanders and the Dutch Republic from the 1640s. Van Son's work in this genre was influenced by Jan Davidsz. de Heem. A representative example in this genre is the Pronk still life with overturned silver ewer (Liechtenstein Museum). Pronk still lifes are often interpreted as having a vanitas meaning.

From the late 1650s van Son painted a number of more modest still lifes in which the composition and colouring was rather restrained. An example is the Still life with fruit basket, lobster and oysters (At Hampel 7 April 2016 Munich, lot 189). These more moderate still lifes are not believed to reference the vanitas theme but rather to celebrate the varied gifts of nature.
