= Jan Pauwel Gillemans the Elder =

Flemish goldsmith and still life painter

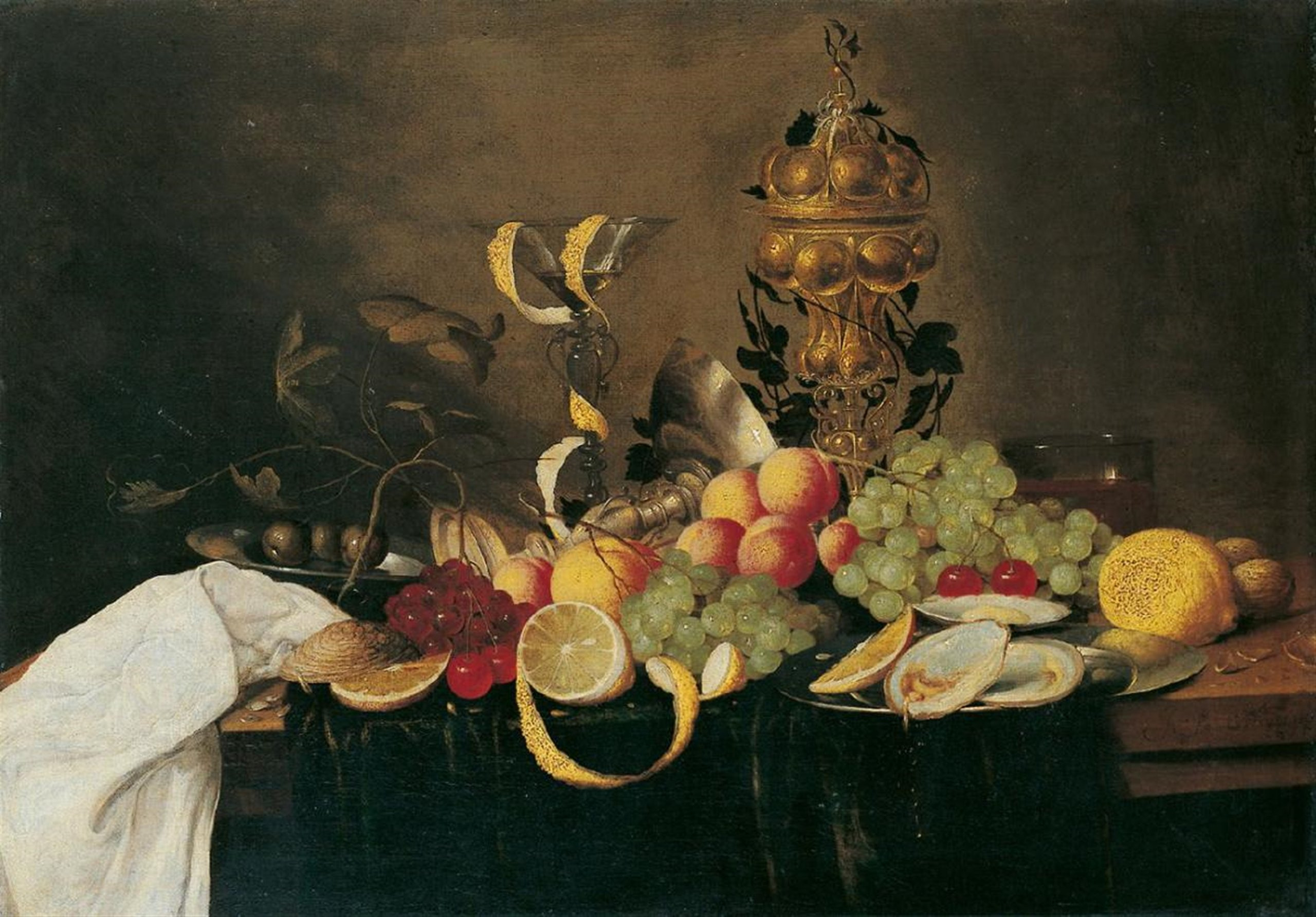
Pronk still life with fruit

Jan Pauwel Gillemans the Elder (Antwerp, 1618 - Antwerp, 1675) was a Flemish goldsmith and still life painter who is known for his fruit still lifes, flower pieces, vanitas still lifes and pronkstillevens.

== Life ==
Jan Pauwel Gillemans the Elder was born in Antwerp as the son of Adriaen Gillemans (born 1592) and Anna Braeckman. His father was a goldsmith and painter and a master of the Guild of Saint Luke of Antwerp. Gillemans was also destined to become a goldsmith and was sent to a family member in Liège to be trained in this craft. While this training included drawing, the young Gillemans wished to become a painter and returned to Antwerp after a stay of 7 to 8 years in Liège.

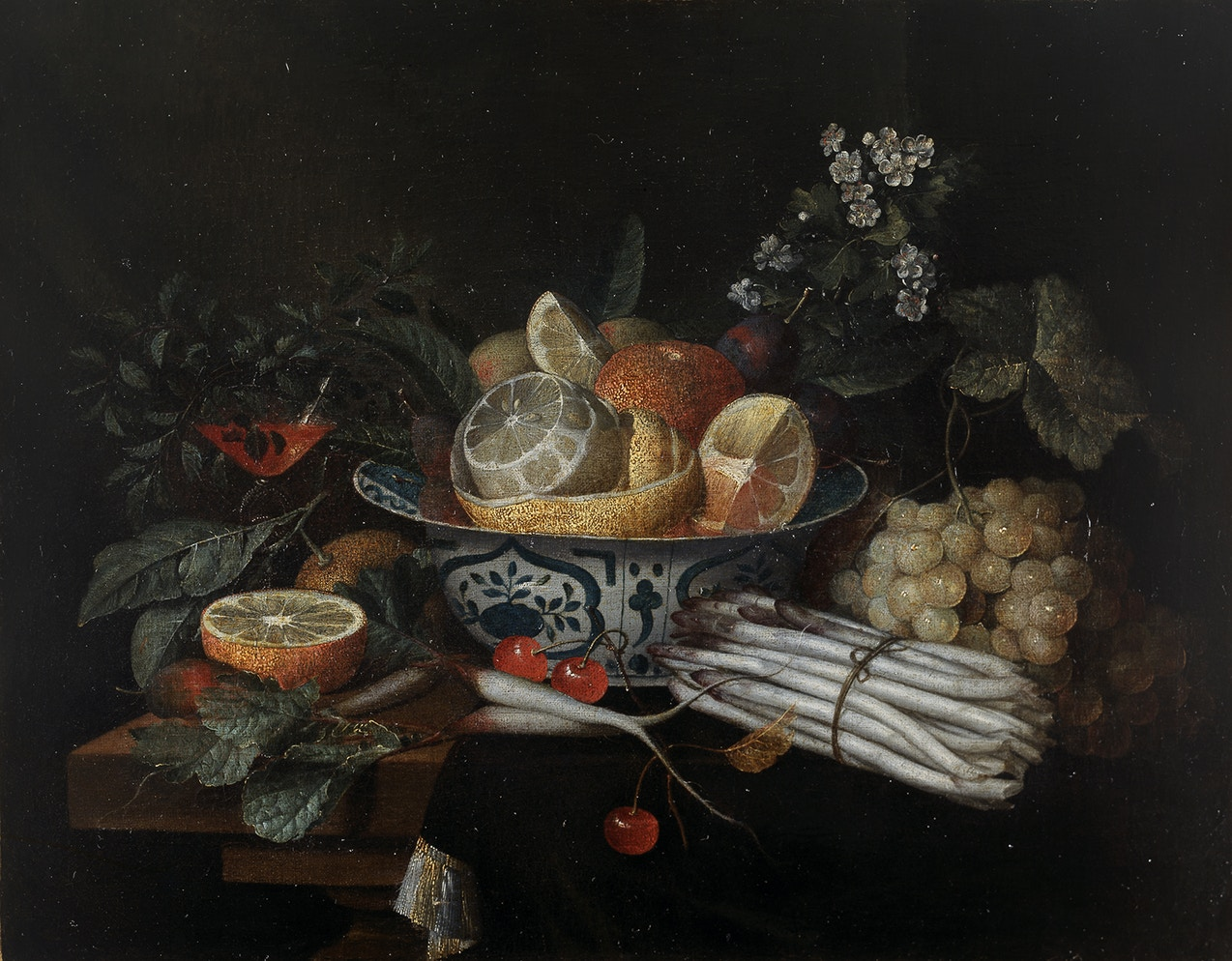
Still life with vegetables and fruits

It is not known with whom he trained to become a painter. He became a master of the Antwerp Guild of St. Luke as the son of a member in the guild year 1647/1648.

In August 1648 Gillemans married Paulina Uyt den Eeckhout. The couple had four sons and four daughters. His sons Jan Pauwel the Younger and Peter Mathys also became still life painters. The needs of his large family forced the artist to open a gold shop. The deacon of the goldsmiths first refused to have him admitted as a goldsmith of the Guild but thanks to the intervention of Antwerp's city magistrate and the submission of his admission piece he was finally accepted in 1662. Gillemans did not abandon painting but continued to paint while running his gold shop. From the records of the Antwerp art dealer Forchondt for the years 1665 to 1673 it is known that Gillemans regularly provided the art dealer with fruit still lifes and garlands with herrings or lobsters for the export.

Gillemans died in Antwerp on 12 August 1675.

He was the teacher of his son Jan Pauwel Gillemans the Younger and Jan Frans van Son, who was the son of the prominent still life painter Joris van Son.

== Work ==
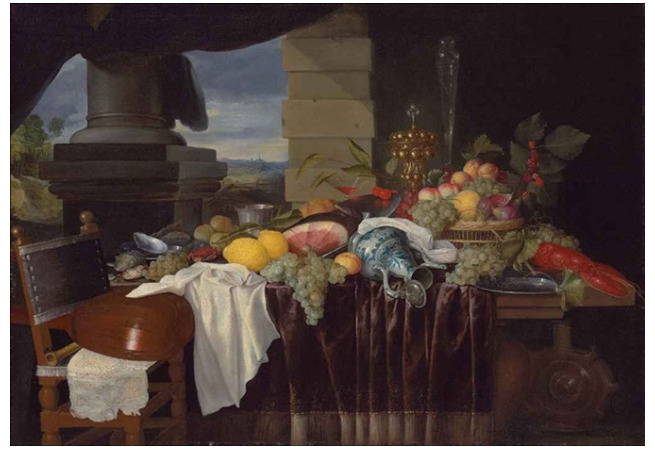
Pronk still life with fruit, a lobster and a lute

The known work of Gillemans is limited. Gillemans was a specialist still life painter who is known for his heavy garlands with fruits and flowers set on a neutral background. He also painted pronkstillevens (i.e. sumptuous still lifes of luxurious objects), vanitas still lifes and garland paintings.

His work shows that he was in contact with the circle of Jan Davidszoon de Heem, a Dutch still life painter who was active in Antwerp from the mid-1630s. Typical characteristics of his work are the studied compositions, beautifully harmonious colours, accurate depictions of various types of fabric and detailed displays of flowers and vegetables in all their diversity.

Some of his works are pronkstillevens, the sumptuous still lifes that were popular in Flanders and the Dutch Republic from the 1640s. A representative example in this genre is the Pronk still-life with fruit and a lobster, a lute on a chair, a landscape seen through a colonnade beyond (At Christie's London on 3-4 July 2012, lot 152), which represents a table laden with fruit, a ham, a lobster, a lute on a chair all placed in front of a landscape visible beyond a colonnade. Pronk still lifes are often interpreted as having a vanitas meaning.

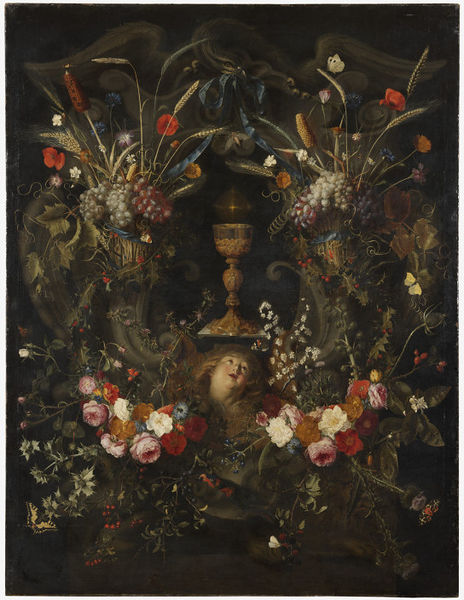
Garland of flowers surrounding a cartouche containing an angel's head and the Holy Sacrament

His fruit still lifes of fruit and flowers were typically of a large format. A few were created on a smaller scale and were popular among contemporary collectors as cabinet pieces. An example is the Still life with lemons, grapes, a pipe and filleted fish (At Dorotheum Vienna on 9 April 2014, lot 566). This signed work shows that in the small format Gillemans preferred narrow views that put the focus on meticulously described objects.

A number of his still lifes fall into the category of 'garland paintings'. Garland paintings are a type of still life invented in early 17th century Antwerp by Jan Brueghel the Elder and subsequently practised by leading Flemish still life painters, and in particular Daniel Seghers. Paintings in this genre typically show a flower or, less frequently, fruit garland around a devotional image or portrait. Garland paintings were usually collaborations between a still life and a figure painter. The figure painter would take care of the figures inside the cartouche while the still life painter was responsible for the flower or fruit garland. The names of the collaborators of Gillemans on his garland paintings are not generally known but a collaboration with Thomas Willeboirts Bosschaert is presumed. An example of Gillemans' work in this genre is the Garland of Flowers Surrounding a Cartouche Containing an Angel's Head and the Holy Sacrament (Victoria and Albert Museum). The garland includes thistles, grains, grapes and other flowers and fruit that allude to the Passion of Christ and to the Sacramental bread and wine of the communion which is depicted in the centre of the composition.

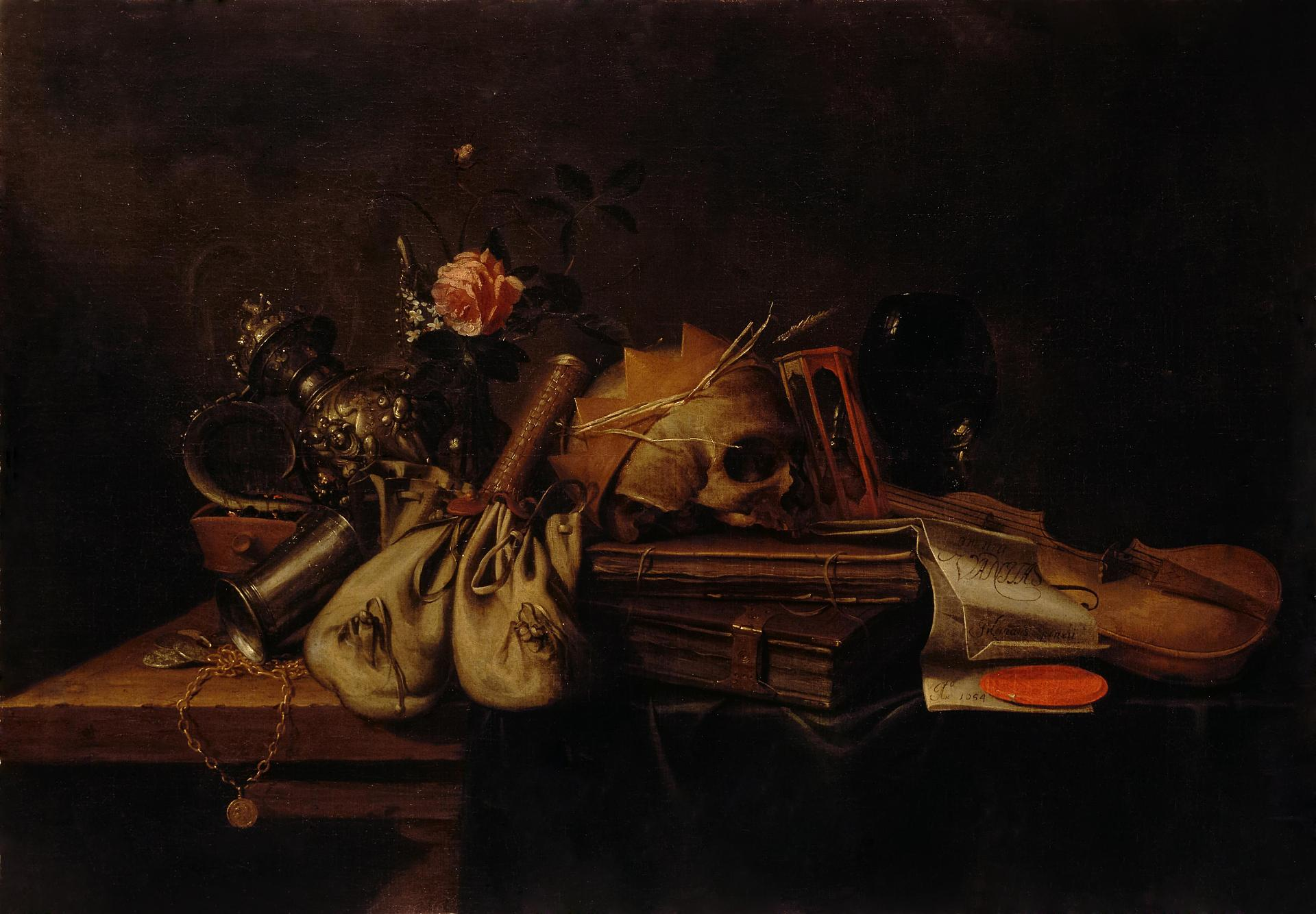
Vanitas still life

Gillemans also painted vanitas still lifes, a genre of still lifes which offers a reflection on the meaninglessness of earthly life and the transient nature of all earthly goods and pursuits. An example is the composition Vanitas still life (Hermitage Museum). This composition contains the typical symbolism of vanitas paintings: a crowned skull, a wilting flower, an hourglass, an empty glass and cup, and a book and money bags (symbolising the futility of mankind's higher and worldly aspirations). On a scroll of paper are written the words 'Omnia Vanitas', which refer to the famous line of the Ecclesiastes, which in the Latin version of the bible called the Vulgate 1:2; 12:8 is rendered as Vanitas vanitatum omnia vanitas. In the King James Version it is translated "Vanity of vanities, all is vanity". This is one of the principal themes of vanitas paintings.
