= Gysbrecht Thys =

Flemish painter (1617–c. 1661)

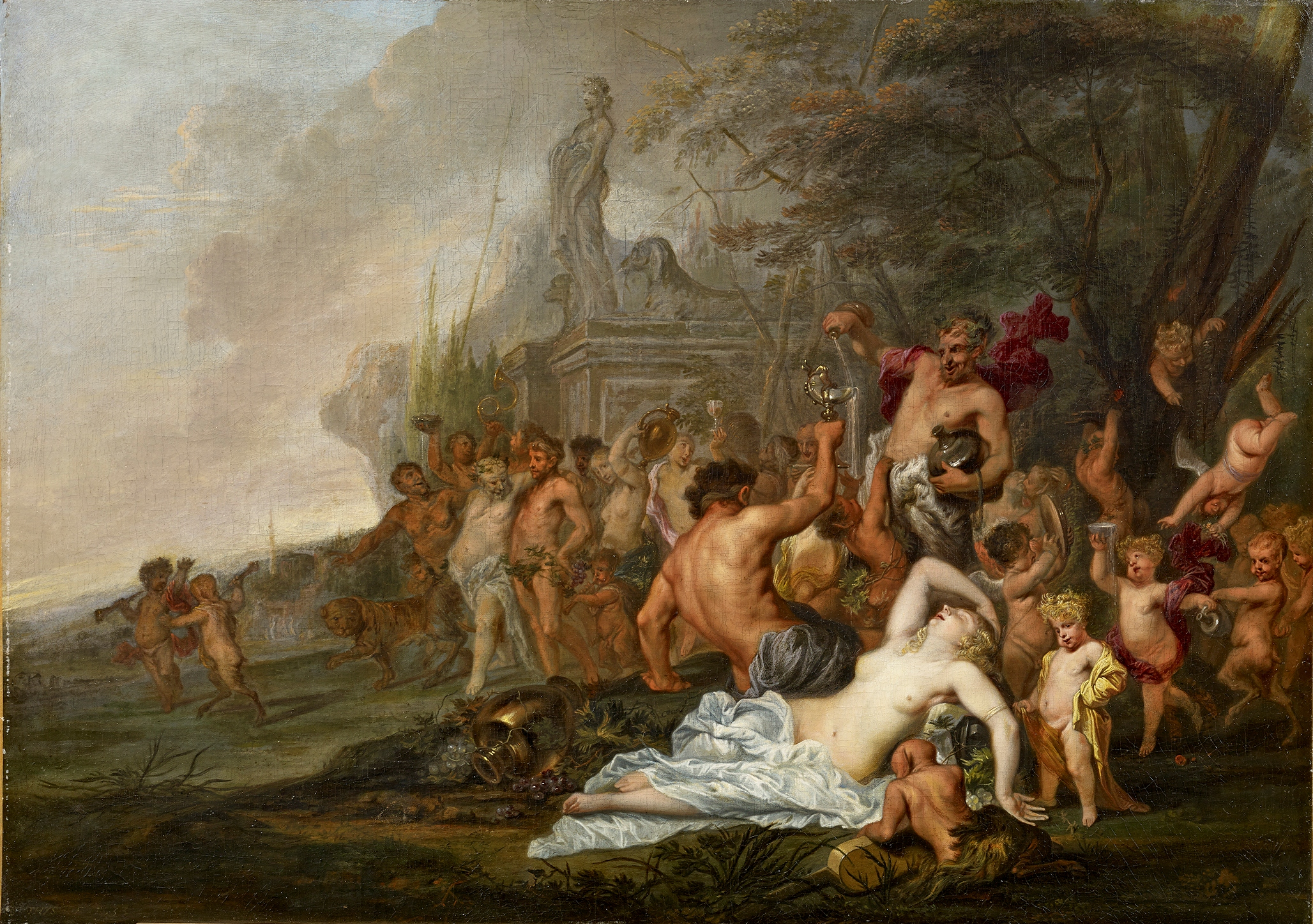
The Golden Era

Gysbrecht Thys or Gysbrechts Thys (baptized on 20 January 1617, Antwerp – after 1661) was a Flemish painter active in Antwerp known for his religious and mythological works as well as for his nudes. He also painted landscapes. Very few paintings have been attributed to the artist to date.

== Life ==
Very little is known about the life of Gysbrecht Thys. He was born in Antwerp. It is believed he was a cousin of the more famous history and portrait painter Pieter Thijs. He was registered as a pupil at the local Guild of Saint Luke in the guild year 1629–1630. He became a master painter at the Guild in the guild year 1636–1637. He married Catharina Lodewijcx on 20 January 1650.

The date of his death is not known with certainty. He was described by Cornelis de Bie as being still alive when his book of artist biographies 'Het Gulden Cabinet' came out in 1661. The 19th century art historian Georg Kasper Nagler stated he died in 1684, citing Jean-Baptiste Descamps' La Vie des Peintres Flamands, Allemands et Hollandois (mid 18th century), although Descamps does not mention this death date.

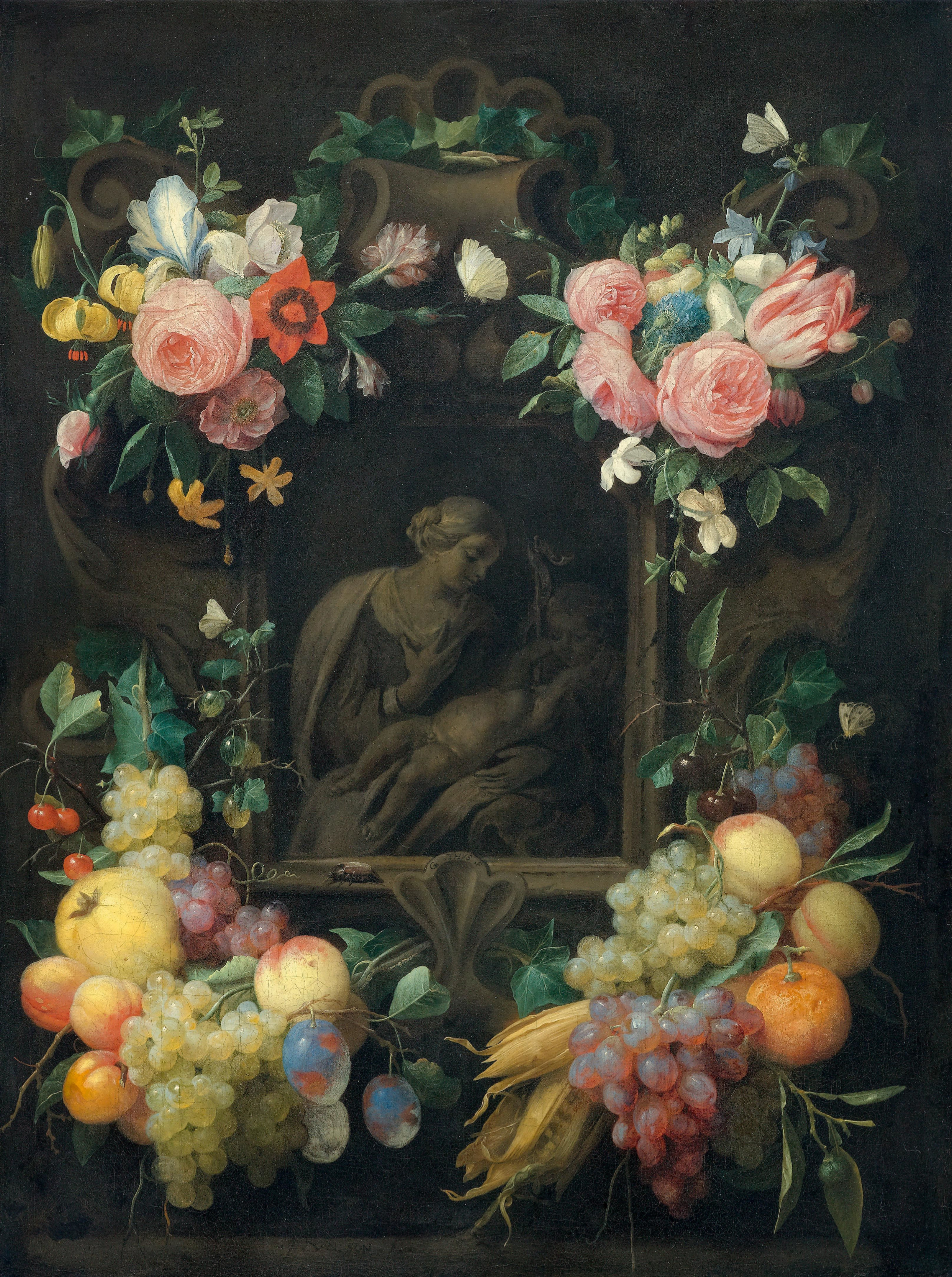
Stone cartouche with a depiction of the Madonna and Child and John the Baptist surrounded by bouquets of flowers and fruits

== Works ==
Thys was described by his Flemish contemporary Cornelis de Bie as a painter particularly skilled in nudes as well as in religious and mythological works. De Bie also credited him with being a good landscape painter. Later Dutch biographers Arnold Houbraken and Jacob Campo Weyerman claimed he was a portrait painter but this may have been a misreading of de Bie's Gulden Cabinet or a confusion with his cousin Pieter Thijs.

A work sold as a Bacchanal but now identified as a representation of the Golden Age is signed and dated '... THYS F. 1653' (At Artcurial on 26 March 2014, lot 121). The Louvre has a photo on file of a painting of the artist, the location of which is unknown. This lost painting shows many similarities in style and in the figures with the composition depicting the Golden Age.

Thys was also active as a figure painter and collaborated with specialist figure painters on so-called 'garland paintings'. Garland paintings are a type of still life invented in early 17th century Antwerp by Jan Brueghel the Elder and subsequently practised by leading Flemish still life painters, and in particular Daniel Seghers. Paintings in this genre typically show a flower or, less frequently, fruit garland around a devotional image or portrait. In the later development of the genre, the devotional image is replaced by other subjects such as portraits, mythological figures and allegorical scenes. Garland paintings were typically collaborations between a still life and a figure painter. The Stone cartouche with a depiction of the Madonna and Child and John the Baptist surrounded by bouquets of flowers and fruits (At Koller Auktionen on 23 March 2018, Zurich, lot 3036) is an example of a collaboration on a garland painting by Thys and the Antwerp still life painter Joris van Son.
