= Peter Mathys Gillemans =

Flemish still life painter

Fruit, rabbits and birds among classical ruins in a landscape

Peter Mathys Gillemans (Antwerp, baptized 28 March 1653 - Schelle, buried on Schelle 7 March 1692) was a Flemish still life painter. He worked in a range of still life genres including flower and fruit still lifes often situated in landscapes and with animals.

== Life ==
Gillemans was born as the son of Jan Pauwel Gillemans the Elder and Paulina Uyt den Eeckhout in Antwerp where he was baptised in the Saint James Church on 28 March 1653. His father was a prominent still life painter. The Gillemans family was originally from the Brussels region. They had moved at the end of the 16th century to Antwerp where they were active as goldsmiths. His elder brother was Jan Pauwel Gillemans the Younger, who also made a name as a still life painter.

Still life of fruit with a red squirrel and a parrot in a landscape

Peter Matthys had two more brothers and four sisters. The size of the family created financial stress for the family. To increase the family income Jan Pauwel the Elder also registered as a master goldsmith with the local guild with the support of the Antwerp city magistrate. Gillemans likely studied with his father. In the Guild year 1673–1674, he and his brother Jan Pauwel became masters of the Guild of Saint Luke of Antwerp as a 'wijnmeester', i.e. the son of a member.

On 28 June 1675 the deputy mayor of Antwerp gave Gillemans special dispensation to marry his bride outside the city walls without loss of his Antwerp citizen rights (poorterij). On 30 June 1675 he then married Anna Palmaert in Schelle, a small town about 12 kilometers south of Antwerp where his bride had been born and resided. The couple settled there and had four boys and two girls between the years 1677 and 1691. The family continued to live in Schelle where he died in 1692.

== Work ==
Gillemans's known work is very limited. He started as a painter of flower still lifes. However, no known flower still lifes by him are currently known. It was not until 1974 that a painting signed by him was located. The few known paintings of the artist are very similar in style and subject matter as those of his brother Jan Pauwel and could therefore be easily confused with them. The works use copper as support.

Fruit still life with a hare

Peter Matthys's large fruit still lifes are typically set in a landscape or architectural setting with columns and fountains and include animals such as rabbits, birds and butterflies. It is not clear whether like his father and brother, he also created 'garland paintings', the type of still life invented in early 17th century Antwerp by Jan Brueghel the Elder. Paintings in this genre typically show a flower or, less frequently, fruit garland around a devotional image or portrait. Garland paintings were usually collaborations between a still life and a figure painter. The figure painter would take care of the figures inside the cartouche while the still life painter was responsible for the flower or fruit garland. At a Bonhams auction a Saint Joseph within a garland of fruit was attributed to the artist.
