= Jan Pauwel Gillemans the Younger =

Flemish still life painter

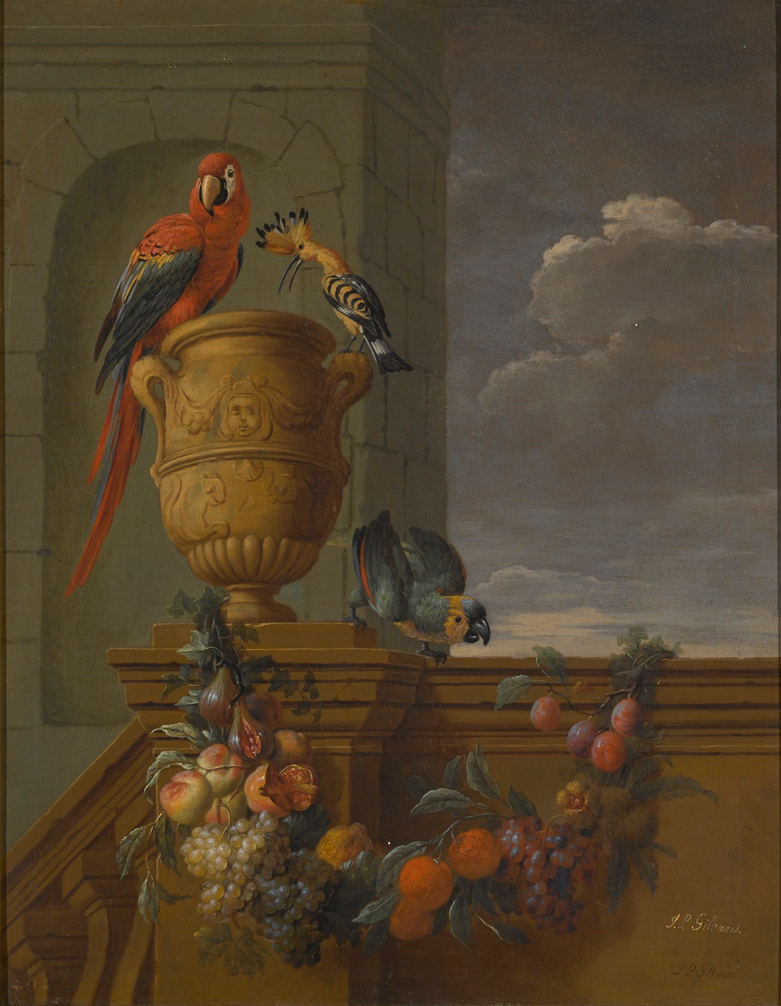
A macaw and a hoopoe perched on a stone urn with a parrot on the balustrade with a swag of fruit

Jan Pauwel Gillemans the Younger (Antwerp, baptized 3 September 1651 - Antwerp, buried 20 March 1704) was a Flemish still life painter. He worked in a range of still life genres including flower and fruit still lifes, banquet still lifes, pronkstillevens and hunting pieces. He collaborated with figure painters to create landscapes which combined a mythological or allegorical scene with a still life. He worked and lived in Antwerp, Middelburg, London and Amsterdam.

== Life ==
Gillemans was born in Antwerp as the son of Jan Pauwel Gillemans the Elder and Paulina Uyt den Eeckhout. His father was a prominent still life painter and goldsmith. The Gillemans family was originally from the Brussels region and had moved at the end of the 16th century to Antwerp where they were active as goldsmiths. Jan Pauwel Gillemans the Younger had three brothers and four sisters. The size of the family created financial stress for the family. To relieve it Jan Pauwels the Elder also registered as a master goldsmith with the local guild with the support of the Antwerp city magistrate. He studied initially with his father. From the guild year 1665-1666 he was formally enrolled at the Guild of Saint Luke of Antwerp as a pupil of the leading Antwerp still life painter Joris van Son who was also a good friend of his father.

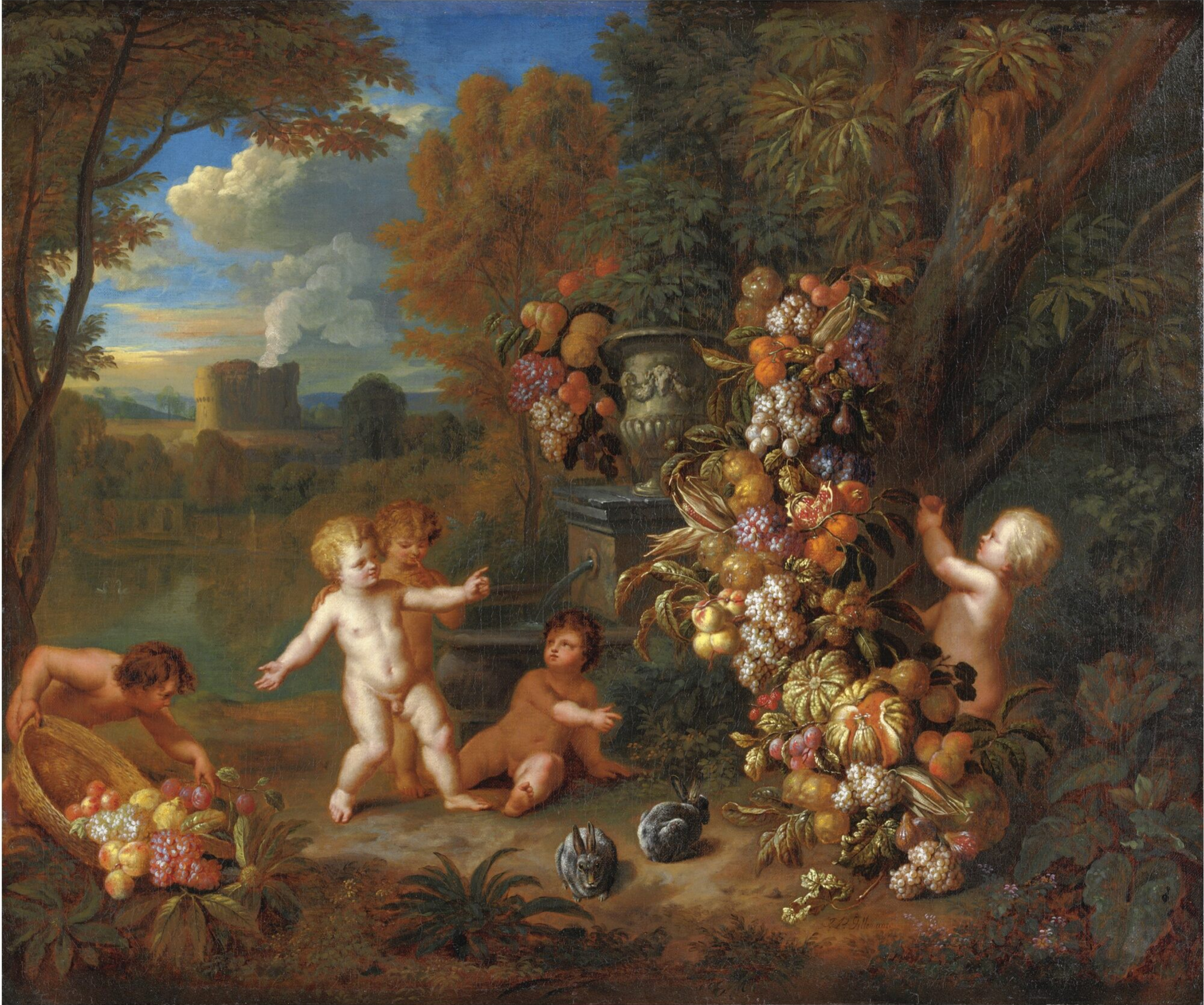
Garland of fruit with putti

Jan Pauwel Gillemans the Younger became a master of the Guild of Saint Luke of Antwerp as a 'wijnmeester', i.e. the son of a member. His brother Peter Mathys who was a successful still life painter as well became a master of the Guild in the same year.

Gillemans worked in Middelburg in the Dutch Republic in 1675. That year he was fined for working as an artist without being registered at the local guild of Middelburg. He is believed to have worked in London in 1678 as can be deduced from the inscription 'Londini' on his Still life with fruit by a fountain in a landscape dated 1673 or 1678 (With art dealer Hoogsteder & Hoogsteder, The Hague in 2004, artwork no. 59038). Gillemans was back in Antwerp from 1680. He married late in life on 3 March 1693. His wife was Isabella Maria van den Eynde, daughter of the local sculptor Norbert van den Eynde. One son was born from the union in 1695. His wife died on 6 October 1697. Not long thereafter, on 22 March 1698 he remarried with the wealthy widow Joanna van Hellefort with whom he had two more sons.

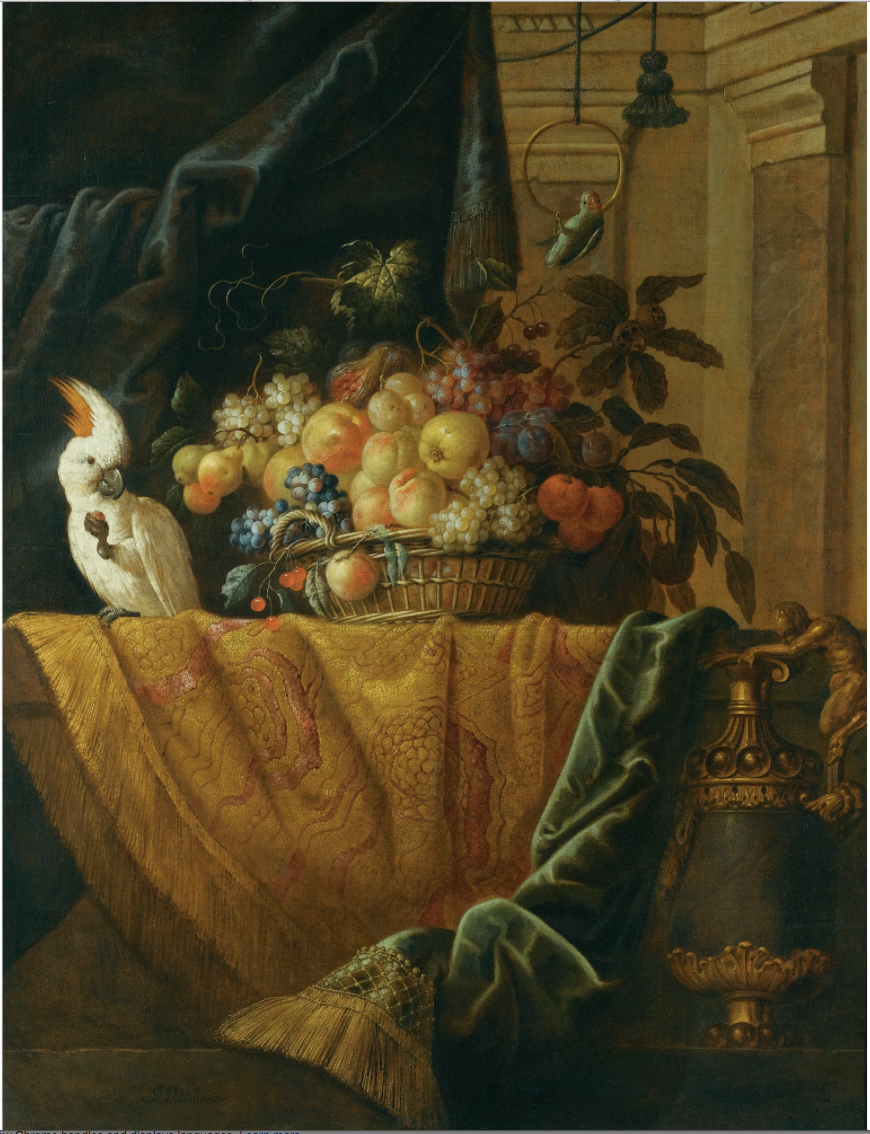
Still life with a basket of fruit and a parakeet upon a ledge draped with a damask

In 1696 Gillemans was elected dean of the Guild but he bought off his duties by a payment to the Guild. In 1702 the artist is recorded back in Middelburg where he became a member of the local Guild of Saint Luke. He is subsequently recorded in Amsterdam where he died in 1704. Whether or not he died by drowning in the canals of Amsterdam after drinking too much as stated by the early biographer Jacob Campo Weyerman in The Lives of Dutch painters and paintresses (third volume, 1729 – 1739) is unclear. Weyerman's anecdotes are often fictitious.

== Work ==
Jan Pauwel Gillemans the Younger was a still life painter mainly of fruit and flower still lifes. His early works were banquet style still lifes. His later, large compositions with fruit still lifes in outdoor settings often included scenes of animals, putti or mythological figures and were created in collaboration with figure painters. He may also have painted garland paintings.

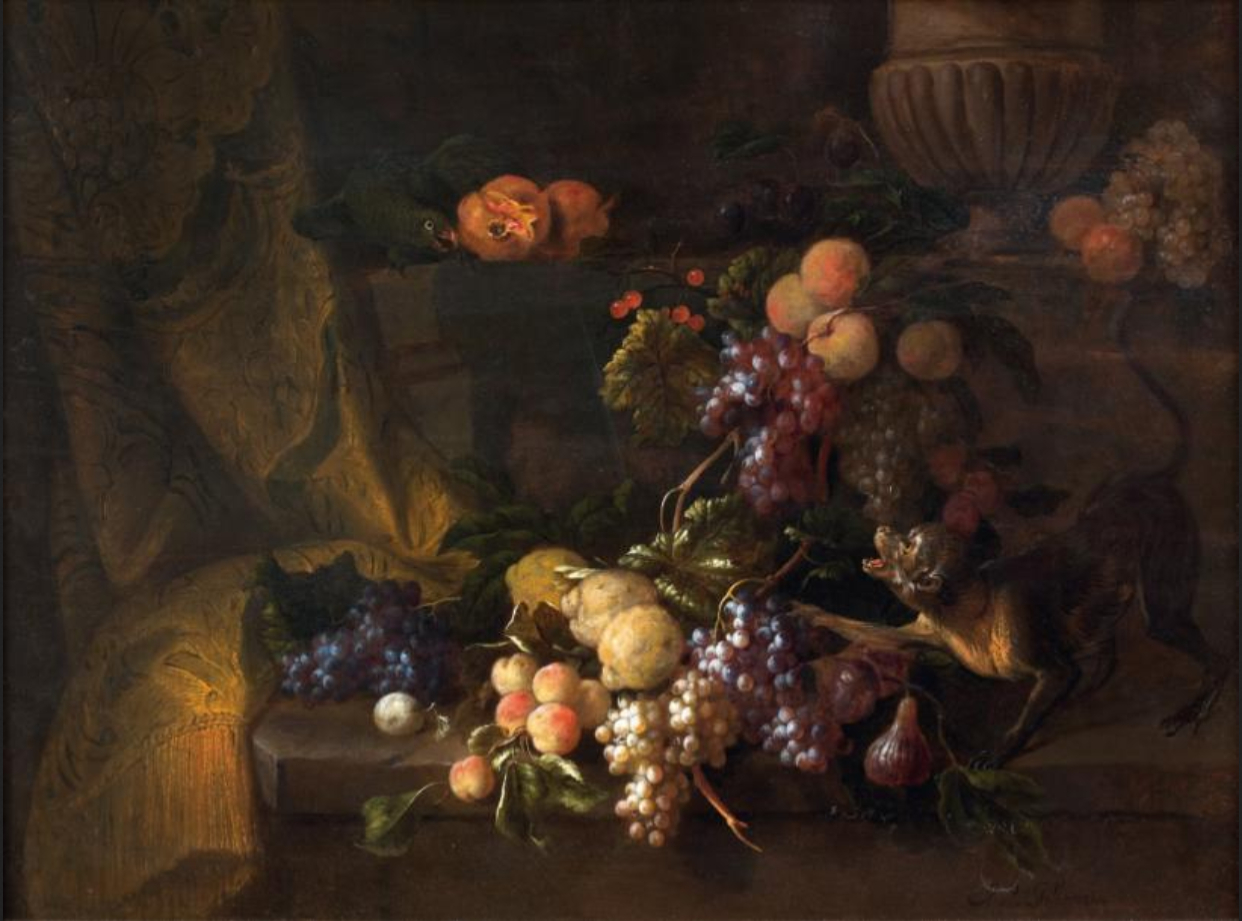
Still life with grapes, monkey and parrot

His early works are close to that of his father and typically depict still lifes of various objects placed on a tabletop or ledge against a neutral background. This type of painting was particularly popular among Antwerp still life painters who had come under the influence of Jan Davidszoon de Heem, a Dutch still life painter who was active in Antwerp from the mid-1630s. Jan Pauwel's father and Joris van Son who were his teachers both produced similar works. Generally speaking, the works of Jan Pauwel the Younger were more decorative in character than those of his father, who had a more limited colour palette.

His work developed away from the style of his father towards a more decorative style, a trend common in Flemish still life painting in the final decades of the 17th century. Under the influence of the French Classical movement the dramatic realism of the early Baroque was replaced by an idealised, decorative vision of nature and reality. These compositions sought to evoke an Arcadian vision of an unspoiled and harmonious nature, uncorrupted by civilization. Typical for his work is the gold-colored lighting of the colors as well as the detailed reproduction of the different fruit varieties.

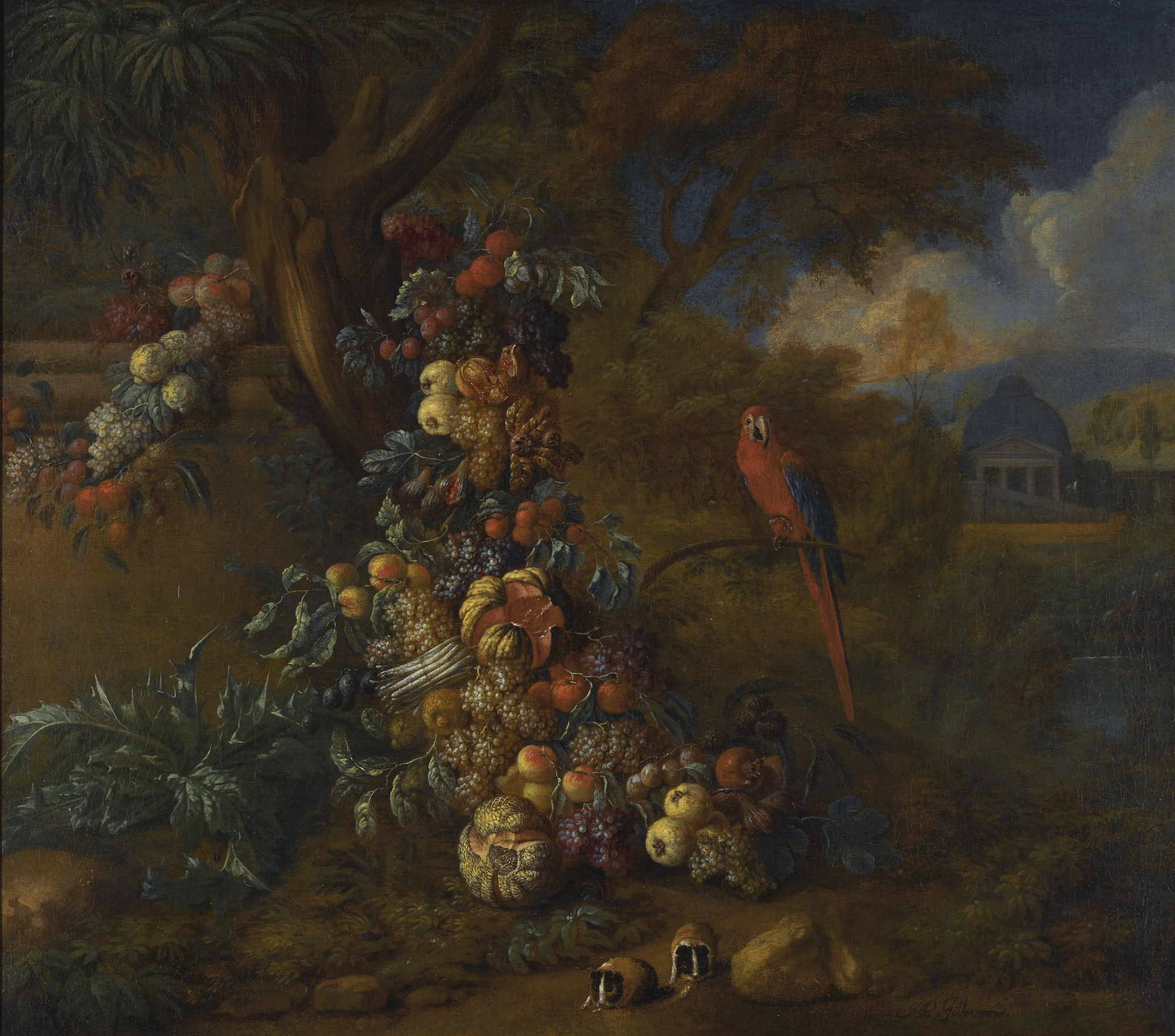
Still life of fruit and vegetables in a park landscape, with a macaw and two guinea pigs

Jan Pauwel regularly placed his large fruit still lifes in a landscape or architectural setting with columns and fountains. For some of these paintings he worked together with specialists such as Pieter Rijsbraeck who was a landscape painter and Peter Ykens who was a figure painter. The identity of the collaborators on his paintings is often unknown. Gillemans was capable of painting the background landscapes for his still lifes himself. When he did, he would paint the trees, foliage and sky with more accuracy than Rijsbraeck.

It is not clear whether like his father, Gillemans the Younger also created 'garland paintings', the type of still life invented in early 17th century Antwerp by Jan Brueghel the Elder. Paintings in this genre typically show a flower or, less frequently, fruit garland around a devotional image or portrait. Garland paintings were usually collaborations between a still life and a figure painter. The figure painter would take care of the figures inside the cartouche while the still life painter was responsible for the flower or fruit garland. A pair of two garland paintings on copper have been attributed to Gillemans the Younger: the Stone niche decorated with fruit and flowers with insects surrounding the Virgin and Child and the Stone niche decorated with fruit and flowers with insects surrounding the Holy Family (At Mercier & Cie, Lille (France) on 26 June 2016, lot 210). While these paintings are quite similar to his father's works in this genre, they have been attributed to the son Jan Pauwel the Younger because they display the more typical traits of his work in their colourful and decorative aspects.
