= Frans van Everbroeck =

Flemish still life painter

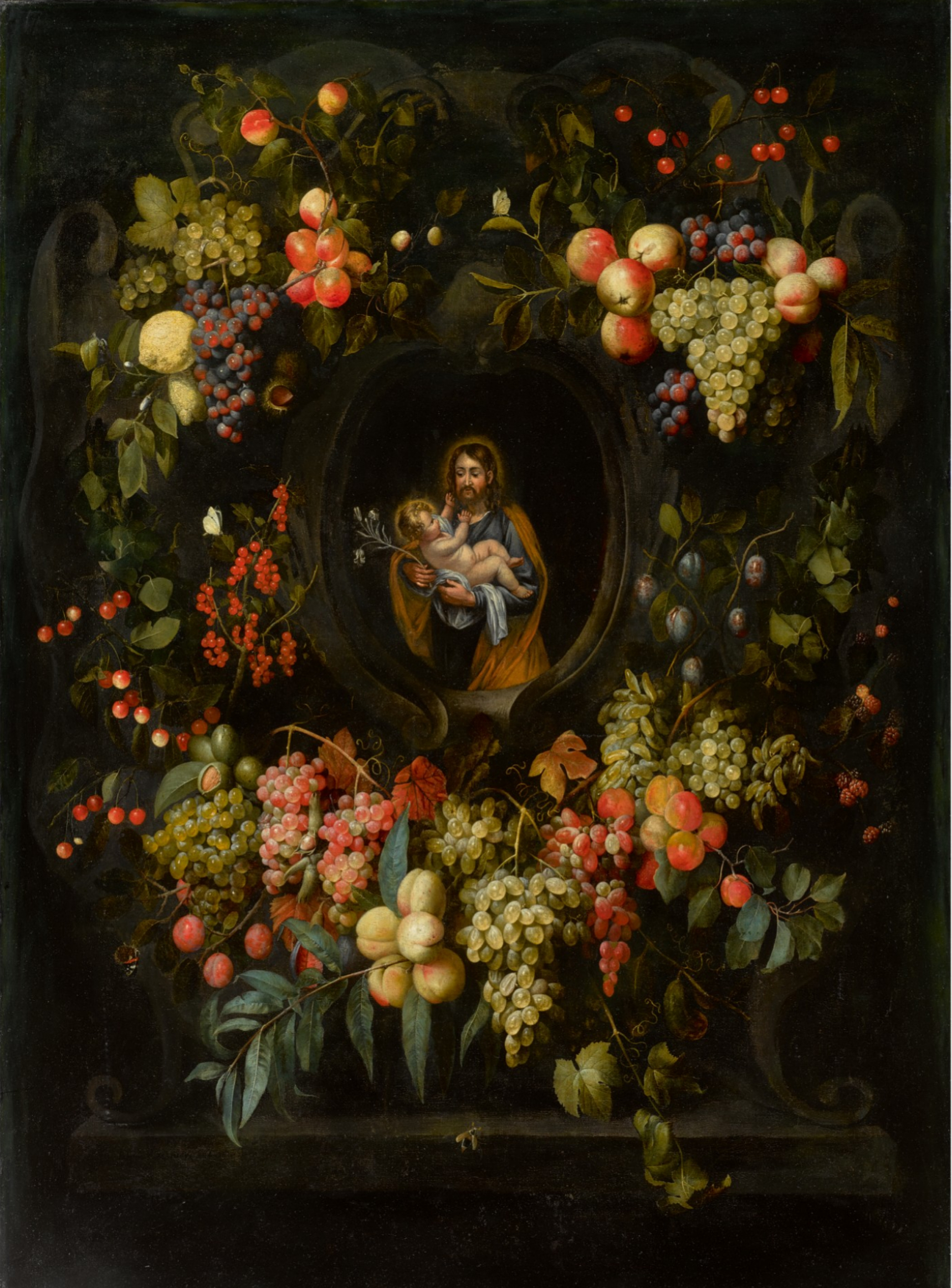
Garland of fruit surrounding St Joseph with the Child Jesus

Frans van Everbroeck (c. 1628– between 1676 and 1693) was a Flemish still life painter who is known for his fruit still lifes, vanitas still lifes and pronkstillevens. He was active in Antwerp, Amsterdam and London. The Dutch painters Abraham Mignon and Maria van Oosterwyck are regarded as his followers.

== Life ==
Information about the life of Frans van Everbroeck is rather sketchy. He is believed to have been born around 1628, likely in Antwerp. He is first recorded when in the guild year 1654/1655 he was registered at the Guild of Saint Luke of Antwerp as a pupil of the prominent still life painter Joris van Son.

He became a master in the local Guild in 1662. As he was admitted as a 'wijnmeester' (wine master') it is likely his father was or had been a master of the Guild.

Van Everbroeck was active in Antwerp until 1672 except for a brief period in 1667 during which he worked in Amsterdam. Peeter Lints was registered as his pupil in the Guild year 1672–73. The next record on the artist places him in England where in 1676 he was admitted to the painter's guild in London (the Painter Stainers Company). During the period 1689 to 1693, paintings by van Everbroeck were regularly offered at English auctions. This could mean that he was possibly still active in London at that time.

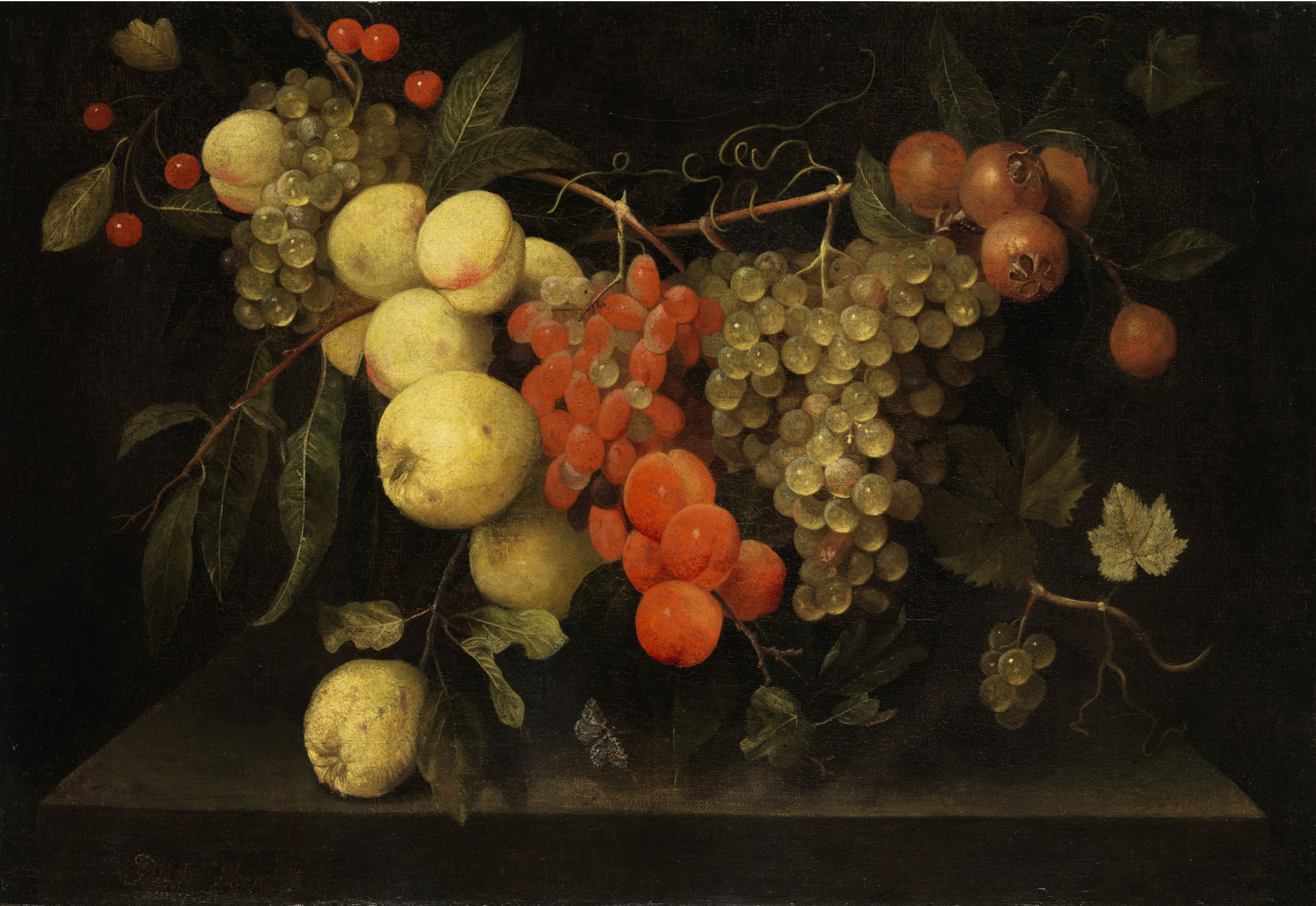
Fruit stil life

The date and place of his death are unknown.

== Work ==
Van Everbroeck painted fruit still lifes, vanitas still lifes and pronkstillevens, i.e. sumptuous still lifes of luxurious objects.

A number of his still lifes fall into the category of 'garland paintings'. Garland paintings are a type of still life invented in early 17th century Antwerp and whose earliest practitioner was Jan Brueghel the Elder. Paintings in this genre typically show a flower or, less frequently, fruit garland around a devotional image or portrait. Garland paintings were usually collaborations between a still life and a figure painter.

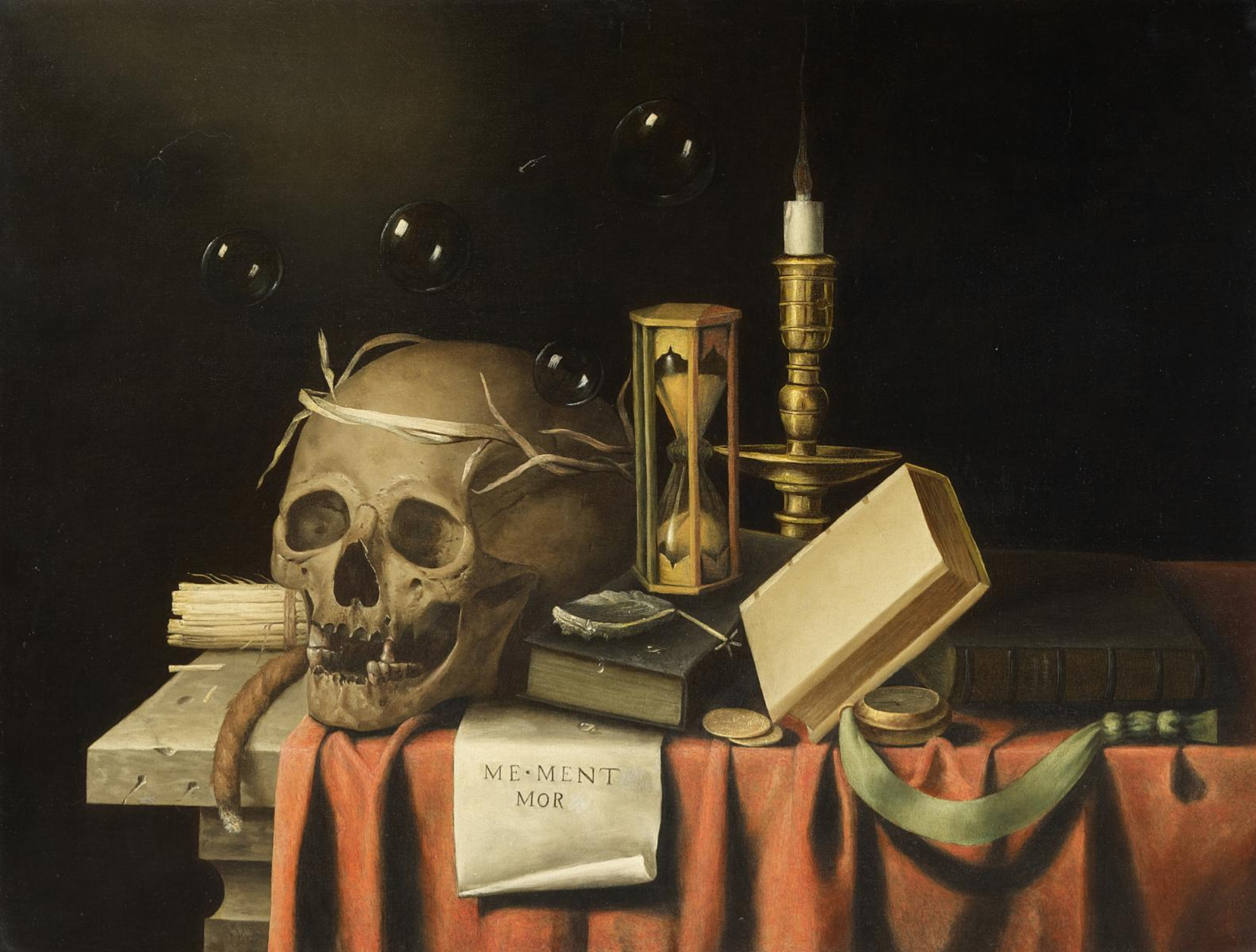
Memento Mori

Van Everbroeck collaborated on garland paintings with other painters, but it is not recorded who were his collaborators. The collaborators painted the figure or figures inside the cartouche while van Everbroeck painted the fruit garland. An example is the Garland of fruit surrounding St Joseph with the Child Jesus (1667, at Hampel Fine Art Auctions on 27 March 2009 in Munich, lot 280). The artist has included a beetle on the stone ledge and a butterfly on the left side among the fruit in the garland. Van Everbroeck rendered the fruits in a luminescent and naturalistic manner, with a pronounced depth. Another example of his production in this genre is A cartouche still life of flowers and fruit around a portrait of a lady dressed as a shepherdess (At Sotheby's on 3 May 2017 in London, lot 138).

Van Everbroeck is also known for his vanitas still lifes, a genre of still lifes which offers a reflection on the meaninglessness of earthly life and the transient nature of all earthly goods and pursuits. An example is the composition Memento Mori (At Van Ham Kunstauktionen on 17 May 2013 in Cologne, lot 478). This composition contains the typical symbolism of vanitas paintings: a skull, soap bubbles, a candle, an hourglass, a watch and a book (symbolising the futility of mankind's higher aspirations). On a paper are written the words Memento mori (Latin: "remember that you have to die"), one of the principal themes of vanitas paintings.

The Dutch painters Abraham Mignon and Maria van Oosterwyck are regarded as his followers.
