= Laurent Geedts =

Flemish still life painter

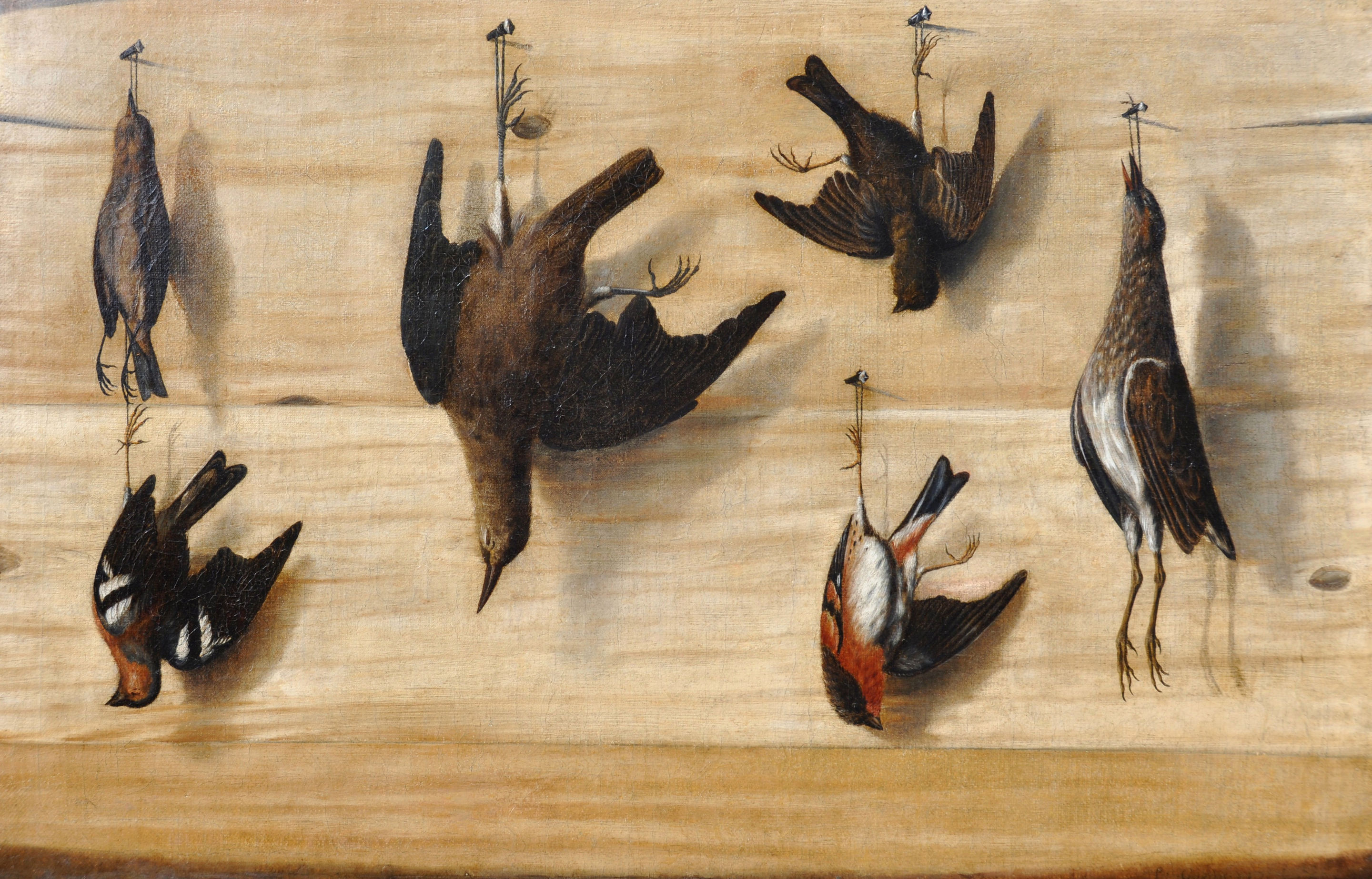
Trompe-l'œil still life of birds hanging from nails against a wooden wall

Laurent Geedts (Leuven, 1728 – Leuven, 1813) was a Flemish still life painter active in Leuven. He is known for his trompe-l'œil still lifes of game birds.

== Life ==
Laurent Geedts was born in Leuven where he appears to have been active throughout his career. He is the first artist in the Geedts family and was followed by a large number of painters, sculptors and engravers. His nephew Josse-Pieter Geedts was a genre, history and religious artist and Josse-Pieter’s son Pieter Paul was a portrait painter, lithographer and sculptor. The artists in the Geedts family further included Guillaume-Auguste (1802–1866) and his three sons Auguste, Hippolyte and Paul.

Laurent Geedts was the master of François Xavier Joseph Jacquin (1756–1826).

== Work ==
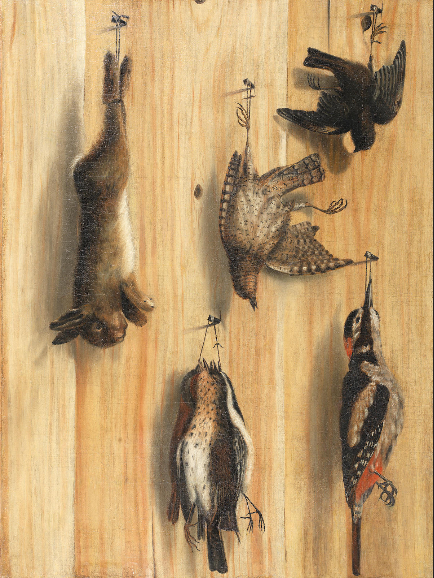
Trompe-l'œil still life with a dead hare, a wryneck, great spotted woodpecker, thrushes and finches

Laurent specialised in still life paintings and in particular trompe-l'œil still lifes of game. He was active as a decorative artist whose works were designed to be displayed over a chimney or as an over-door. He produced accurately observed depictions of birds.

His work continued the tradition of trompe-l'œil still lifes of game of the Netherlandish masters of the 17th century such as Jacob Biltius, Cornelis Biltius and Cornelis Norbertus Gysbrechts. His illusionistic works of game birds against a plain or wooden wall use natural light and shade effects, combined with a very detailed and precise rendering of the plumage to create the trompe-l'œil effect that they appear to be real.
