= Frans van Dorne =

Flemish painter

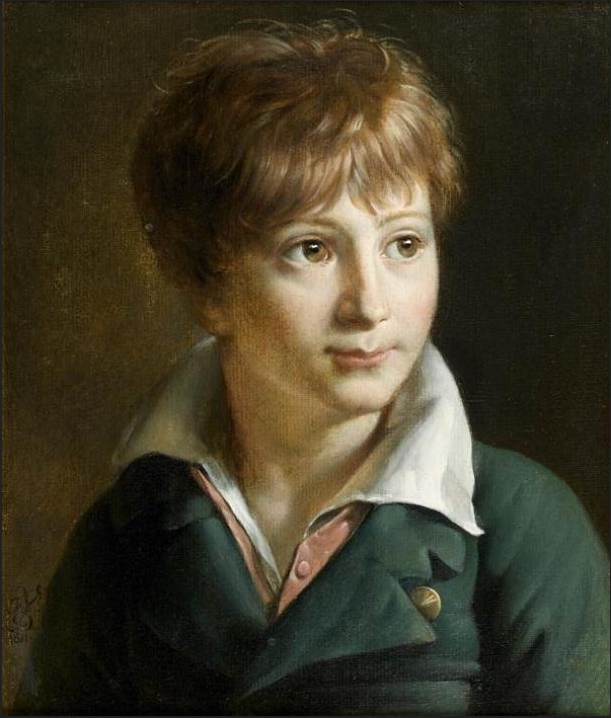
Portrait of a young man

Frans van Dorne or François van Dorne (Leuven, baptized on 10 April 1776 – Leuven, 30 November 1848) was a Flemish painter of portraits and religious subjects. He is known for his still lifes of fruit and flowers. He trained in Paris with the famous French Neoclassical painter Jacques-Louis David. Van Dorne worked in Paris until 1822, the year in which he returned to his hometown Louvain.

== Life ==
Frans van Dorne was the son of Martin van Dorne and Petronilla Ekermans. His father was an eminent painter of still lifes of fruit and flowers who was nominated court painter by Prince Charles Alexander of Lorraine, the governor of the Austrian Netherlands.

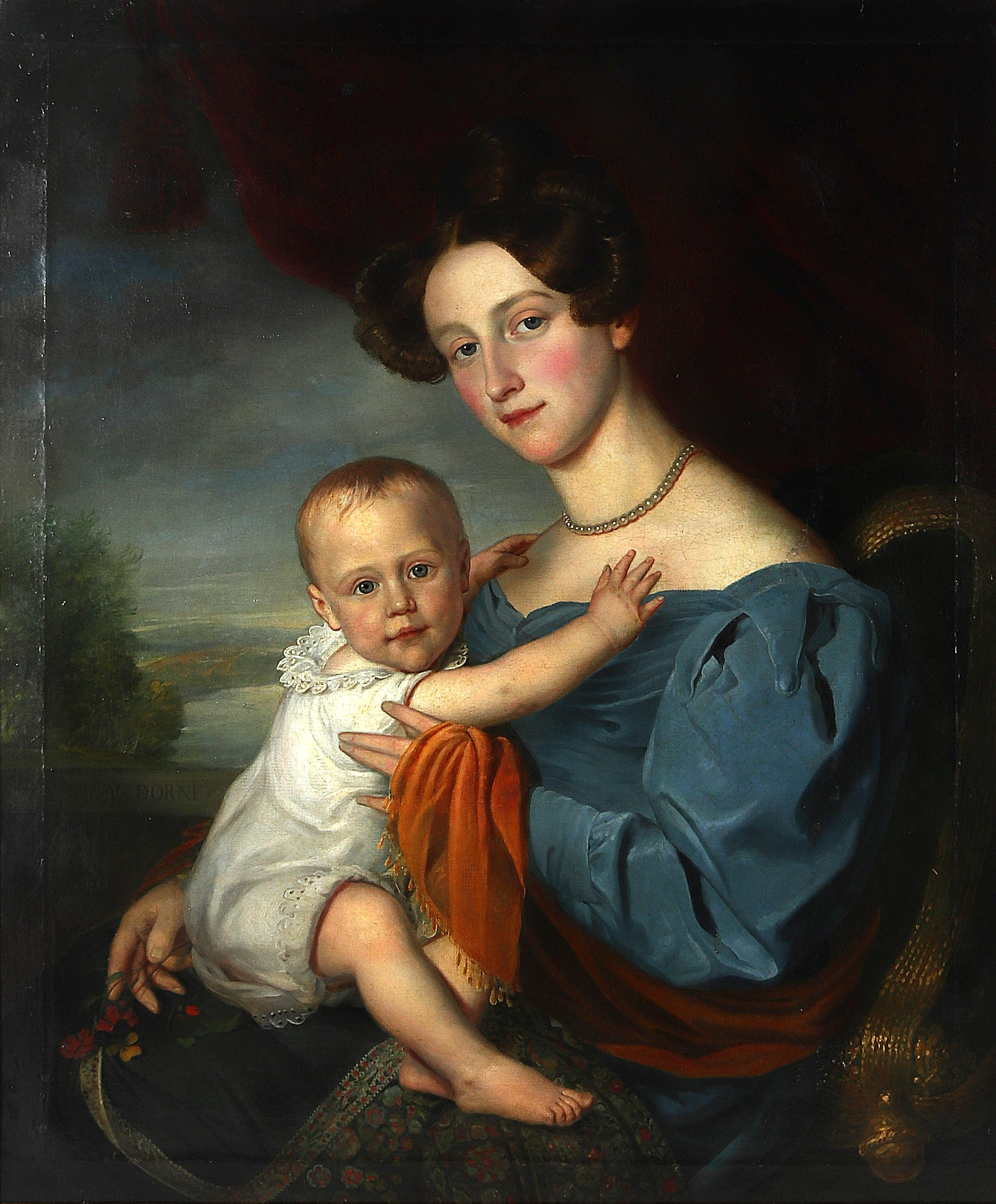
Mother and child

Frans trained initially with his father. Later he studied under Pieter-Jozef Verhaghen, a prominent history and portrait painter in the Baroque style and a court painter of Maria Theresa of Austria. Verhaghen was then a teacher at the Academy of Leuven, which had been founded in October 1800 by van Dorne's father, together with Verhaghen, François Xavier Joseph Jacquin, Josse-Pieter Geedts, Frans Berges, Pieter Goyers and Antoon Clevenbergh.

Van Dorne won the prize for drawing after the antique at the Academy in 1802. Thanks to the prize he disposed of the necessary financial resources to continue his studies in Paris. In Paris he became one of a selected number of pupils of Jacques-Louis David, the famous French Neoclassical painter. He worked in Paris for a long time.

In 1806, he received from the magistrates of his native city Leuven a commission to paint a full-length portrait of Emperor Napoleon. Van Dorne submitted a mythological picture representing Venus to the Paris Salon of 1808. The painting was not well received by the critics and from that time onwards the artist decided to dedicate himself to portrait painting.

Van Dorne married Maria Theresia Bastiné who was the sister of the painter Jean-Baptiste Bastiné of Louvain, an artist who had also studied under David in Paris around the same time as van Dorne.

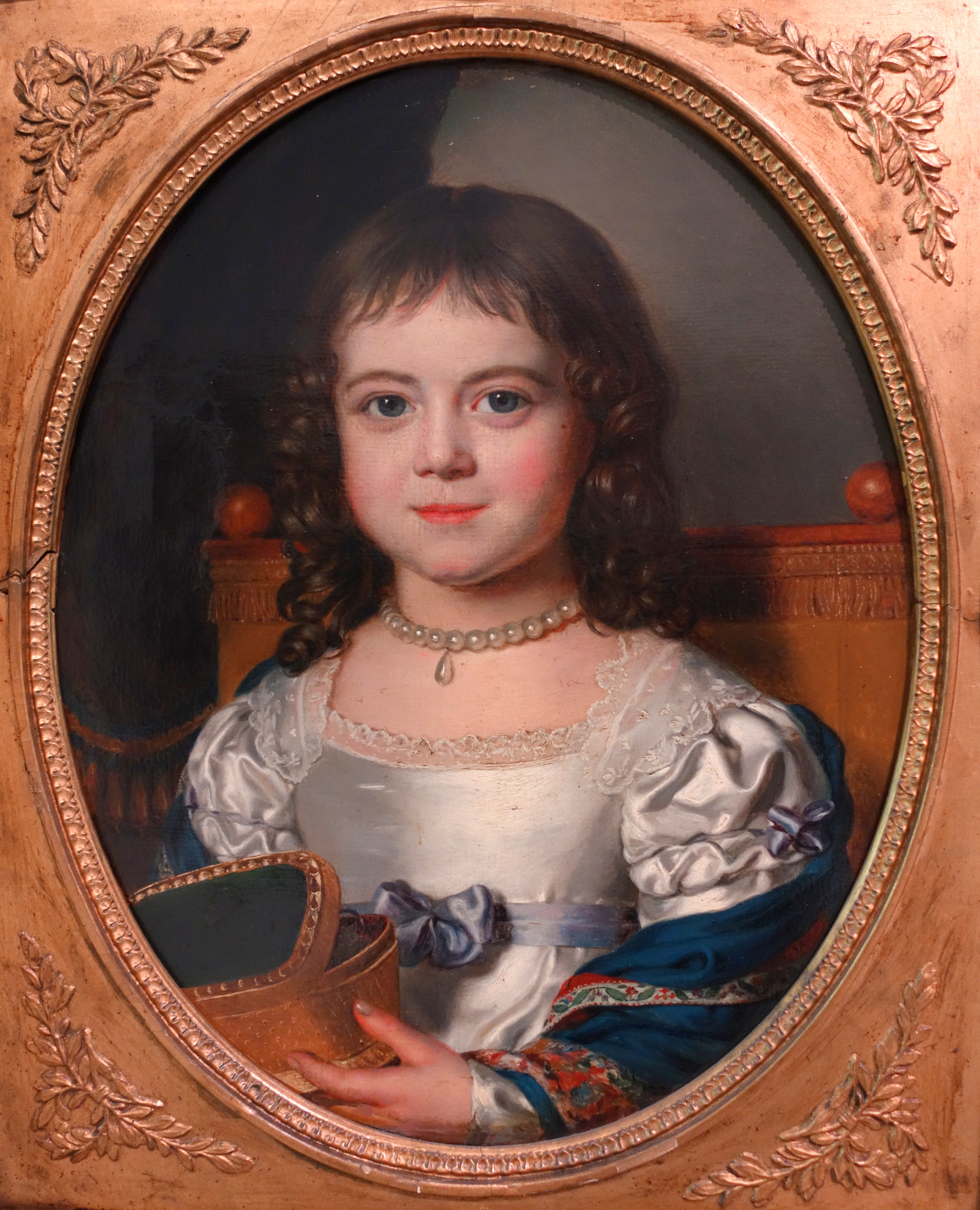
Fanny Van Dorne, the artist's daughter

Van Dorne remained in Paris until 1822, the year in which he returned to his hometown Louvain. He produced a large number of portraits until the end of his career. He received a commission from a monastic institution in England to paint four religious compositions representing various episodes of the life of the Virgin. He also painted a copy of a masterpiece of the Flemish Baroque master Gaspar de Crayer for the St. Peter's Church in Leuven.

He died in Leuven on 30 November 1848.

== Work ==
Frans van Dorne was mainly a portrait painter although he also painted a number of religious compositions. His portraits show the influence of the French Classicism that he had studied under David in France.
