= François Xavier Joseph Jacquin =

Flemish painter and draughtsman

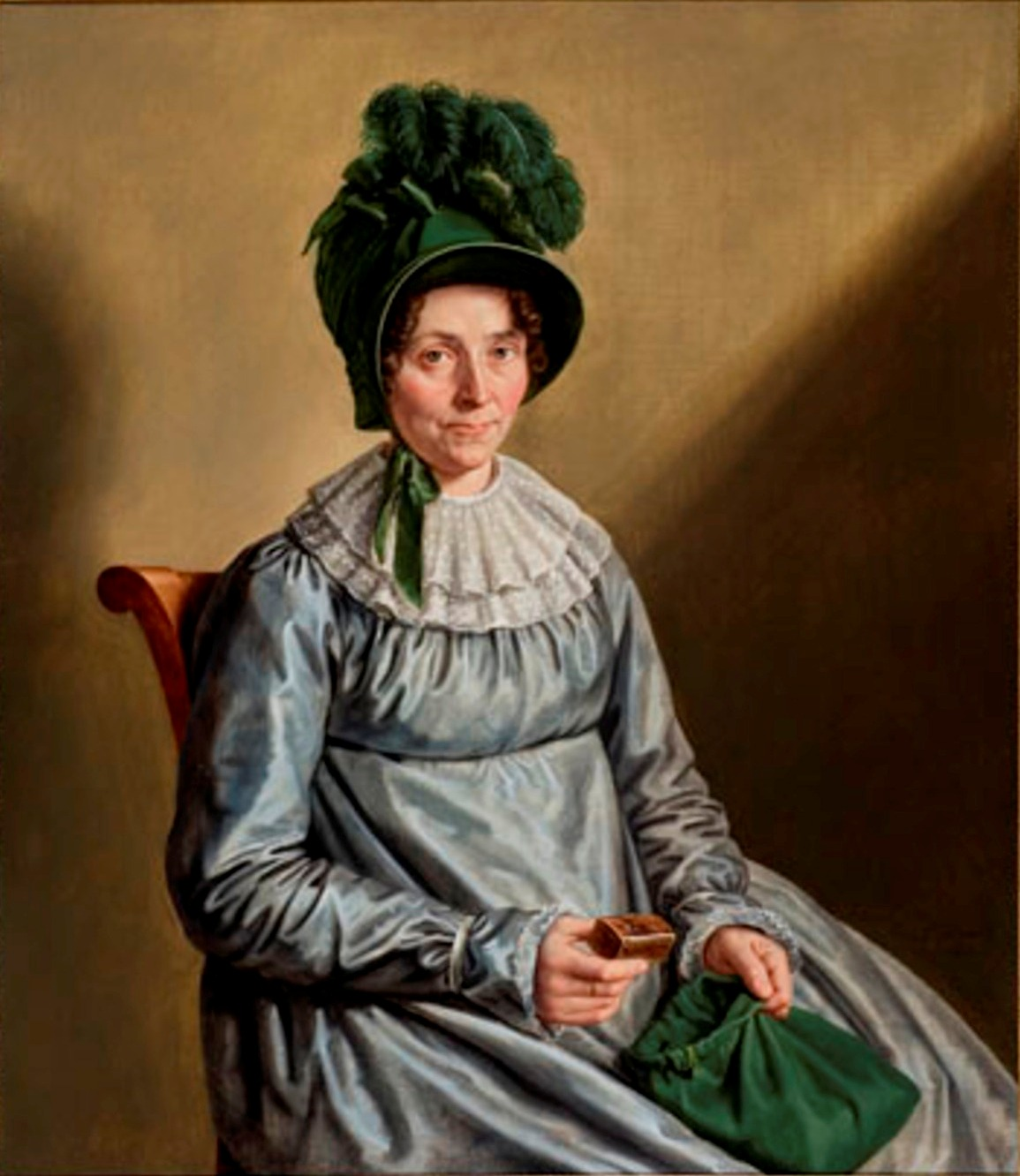
Portrait of Henrina Catharina Boogaerts

François Xavier Joseph Jacquin or Frans Jaquin (1756 in Brussels – 1 November 1826, in Leuven) was a Flemish painter and draughtsman known for his portraits, still lifes and landscapes. He was in demand as a portrait painter of religious dignitaries, the nobility and the bourgeoisie. As a still life painter he created game pieces and trompe-l'œil still lifes of game birds.

== Life ==
François Xavier Joseph Jacquin was born in Brussels. He commenced his art studies at the Académie Royale des Beaux-Arts in 1768 and later moved to Antwerp where he trained in the workshop of Hendrik-Jozef Antonissen, a painter of landscapes and cattle. Here he also befriended the landscape painter Balthasar Paul Ommeganck. He moved to Leuven in 1776 where he became a student of Laurent Geedts, a still life painter.

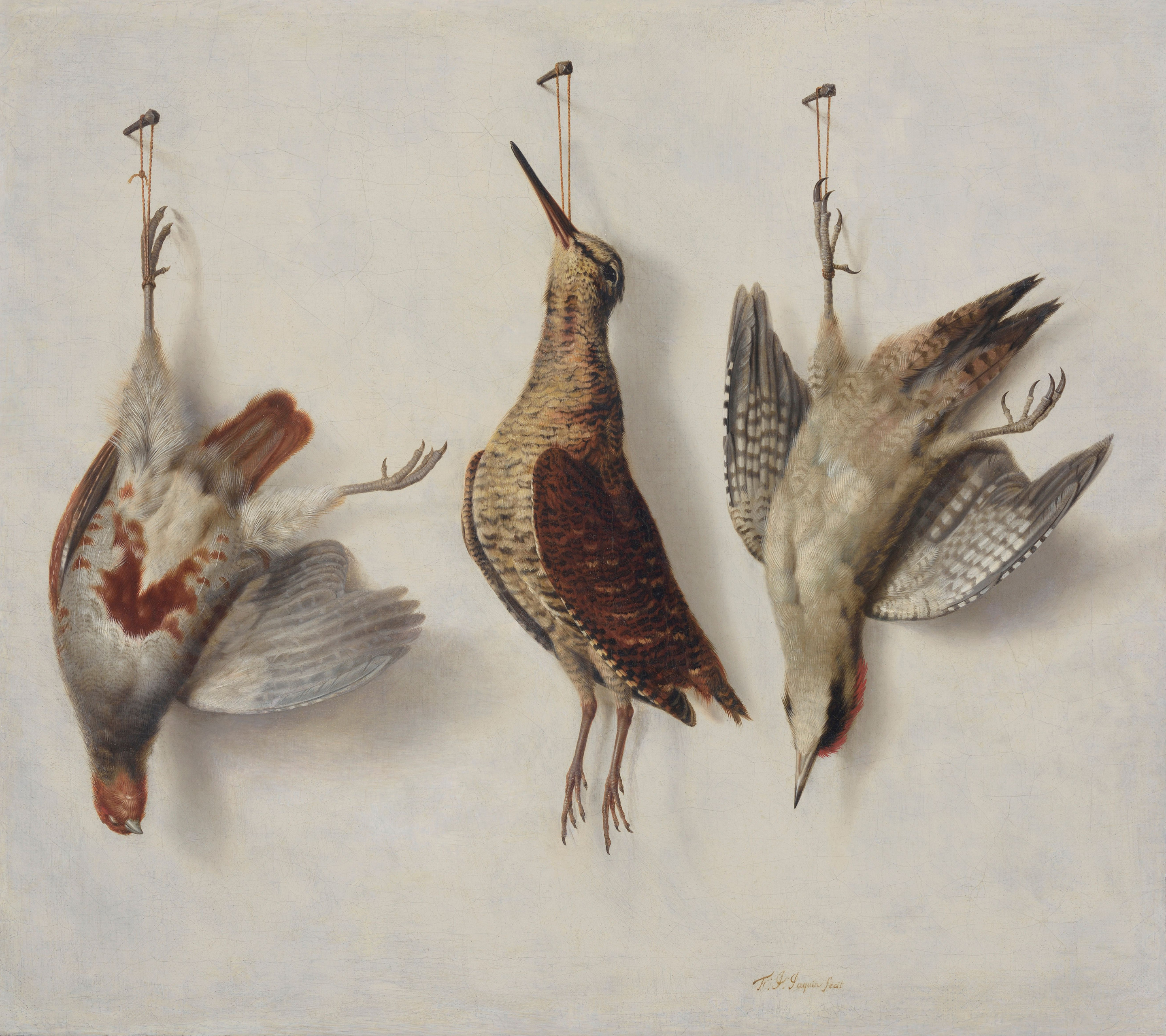
Trompe-l'œil still life of game birds

He married Anna Maria Simons of Leuven in 1777. The couple had 14 children of whom only two survived into adulthood.

He initially devoted himself to still lifes and then from 1780 onwards he became in demand as a portrait painter. After gaining a commission to paint Simon Wouters the prelate of the Park Abbey in Heverlee near Leuven, he was able to obtain many further commissions from religious dignitaries including the archbishop of Mechelen Franckenberg and of professors of Leuven University. These portrait commissions kept him particularly busy.

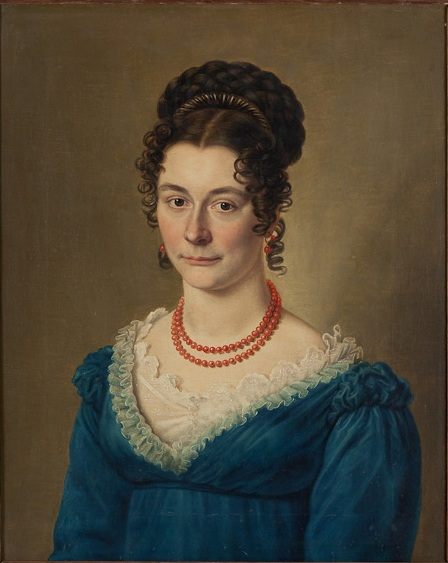
Portrait of Mrs. De Virieu of Zaltbommel

He painted a portrait of the Austrian Emperor Francis II for the city hall of Leuven in 1792. This work was engraved by Antoine Cardon and displayed in the city hall of Leuven where it was burnt on 21 January 1795 by citizens of Leuven. He became the appointed portraitist of the notables and bourgeois of Leuven but also recruited his clientele in Hainaut, Brabant and The Netherlands. After the invasion of the Southern Netherlands by the French in 1794, Jacquin's commission work dried up and he gave up painting to trade in wine and cloth.

Jacquin was together with Josse-Pieter Geedts, Frans Berges, Pieter-Jozef Verhaghen, Pieter Goyers, Martin van Dorne and Antoon Clevenbergh one of the founders of the Academy of Fine Arts of Leuven in 1800. After the founding of the academy, Jaquin's artistic career took off again and he re-established himself as a portrait painter to the world of merchants and the middle classes of Leuven.

One of his pupils at the academy was Henri van der Haert. He died on 1 November 1826 in Leuven.

== Work ==
François Xavier Joseph was mainly a portrait painter but he also created still life paintings and landscapes. He produced accurately observed depictions of birds.

In his portraits, Jacquin aimed to render realistic clothes, furniture and architecture. His palette is bright and fresh.

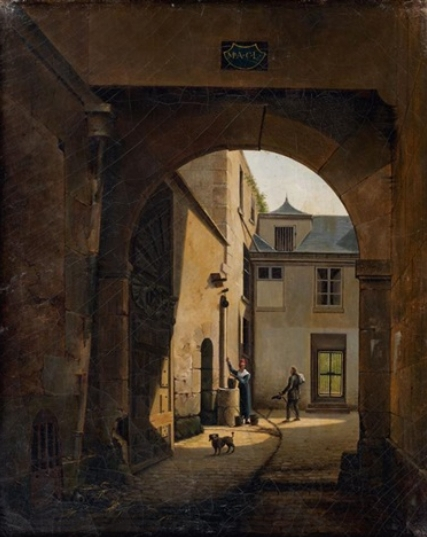
Street scene

His still lifes were typically closely observed depictions of birds, often draped over the edge of a table. These works are somewhat reminiscent of the works of the Dutch still painter Elias Vonck. His illusionist work continued the tradition of trompe-l'œil still lifes of game of the Netherlandish masters of the 17th century such as Cornelis Norbertus Gysbrechts, Jacob Biltius and Cornelis Biltius. Jacquin's illusionist works of birds against plain walls use natural light and shade effects together with accurate painting of the plumage to create the illusionistic effect that they are real.

Jacquin also painted a few realistic street scenes.
