= Henri van der Haert =

Belgian portrait painter, sculptor, illustrator and engraver

Portrait of Henri van der Haert, par Sophie Rude, née Frémiet. Huile, 1827.

Henri van der Haert, Hendrik van der Haert or Henri Anne Victoria van der Haert (1790–1846) was a Belgian portrait painter, sculptor, illustrator and engraver.

== Life ==
He was born in Leuven, and was a student at the Academy of Leuven under Josse-Pieter Geedts (1770–1834), who gave him his first lessons in painting. He also studied with the portraitist François Xavier Joseph Jacquin (1756–1826).

After a trip to Paris, he decided to settle in Brussels in 1818. He attended classes with Jacques-Louis David and worked in the studio of the sculptor François Rude. He was given some commissions to execute architectural drawings and decorative ornaments for the castle of Tervuren. In 1819, he made bas-reliefs in grisaille for the halls of the Concert Noble in Brussels. He attended a school of drawing, before being appointed in 1836 as professor at the then newly founded Royal School of Engraving in Brussels.

He was director of the Royal Academy of Fine Arts in Ghent from 1841 until his death, teaching among others, Liévin De Winne (1821–1880).

He was a protégé of the family d'Arenberg. He died in Ghent.

== Work ==
His work includes a large number of portraits, drawn and lithographed, and engravings from the works of contemporary artists.

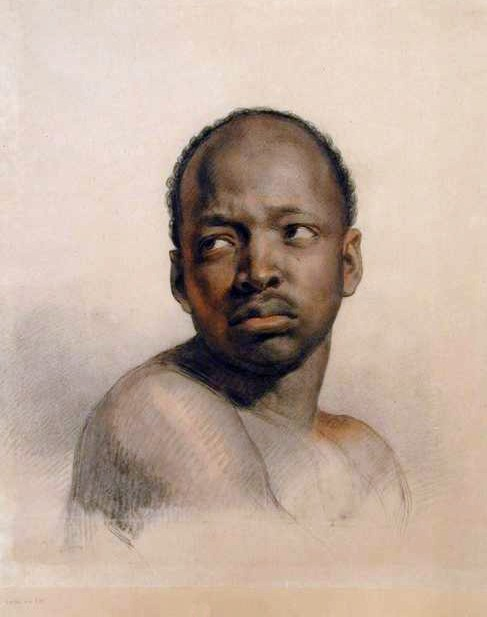
Head of an African

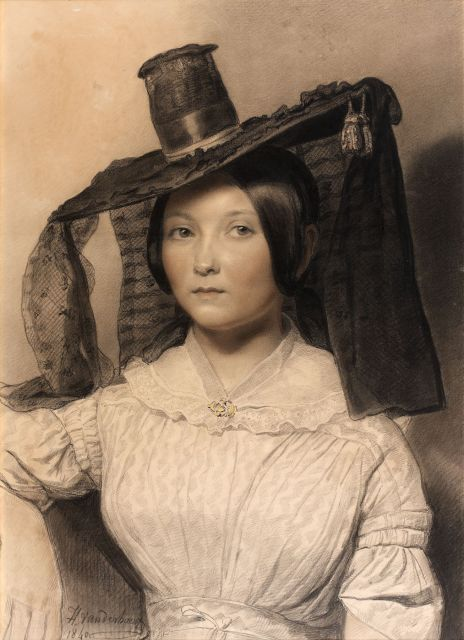
Presumed portrait of the artist's daughter
