= Martin van Dorne =

Flemish painter (1736–1808)

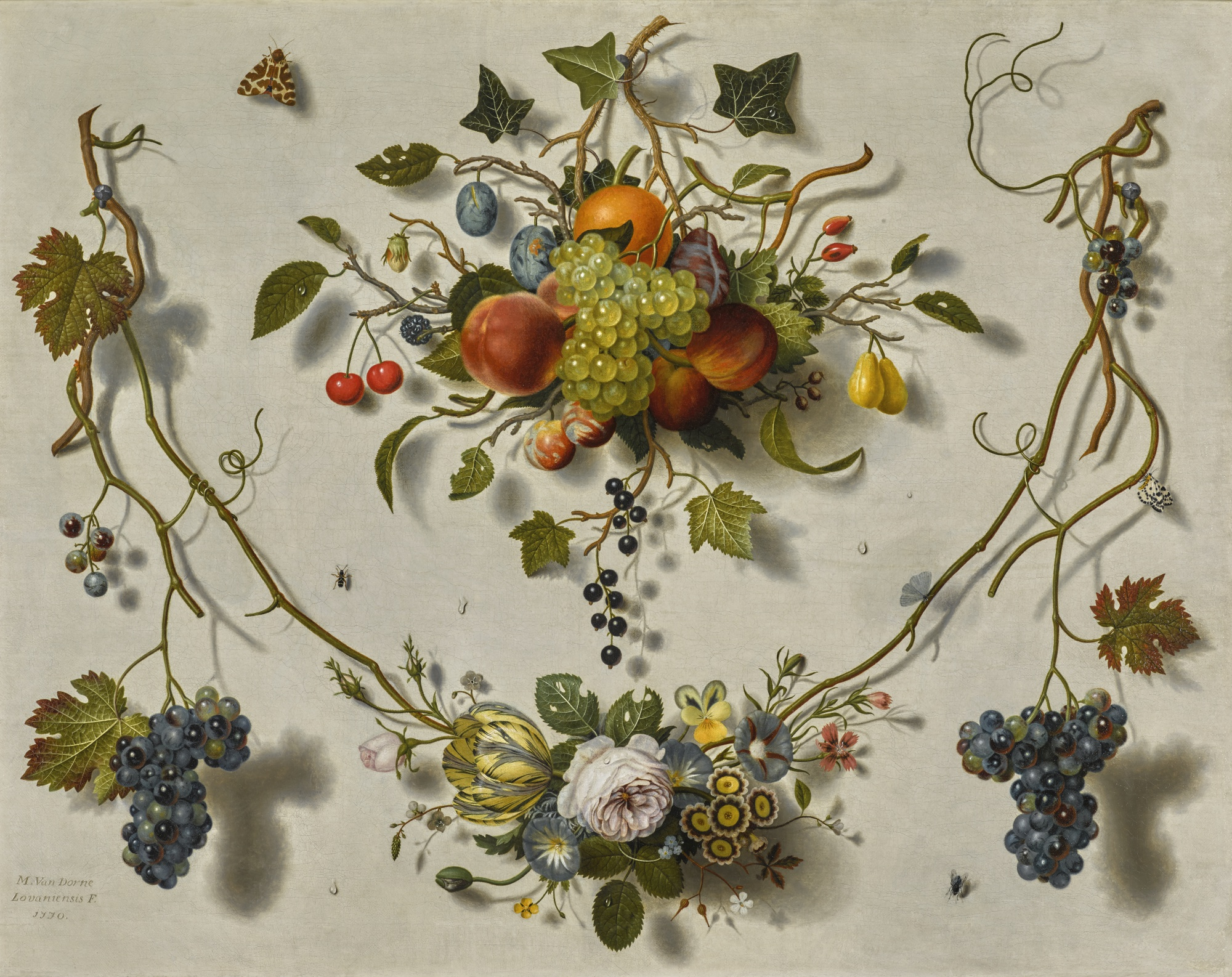
Trompe l'œil of swags of fruit and flowers pinned to a white wall together with moths and other insects

Martin van Dorne or Martinus Vandorne (Leuven, baptized on 22 January 1736 – Leuven, 2 May 1808) was a Flemish painter and poet who specialized in still lifes. He is known for his still lifes of fruit and flowers. He was nominated court painter by Prince Charles Alexander of Lorraine, the governor of the Austrian Netherlands. He was also a poet in the Dutch language.

== Life ==
Martin van Dorne was the son of Amandus van Dorne and Elisabetha Annosset. Nothing is known about his training and early career. It is possible that he was self-taught. He was established in his hometown as a painter of floral still lifes and gained a regional reputation. Possibly, like many contemporaries, he was also working as a decorative painter.

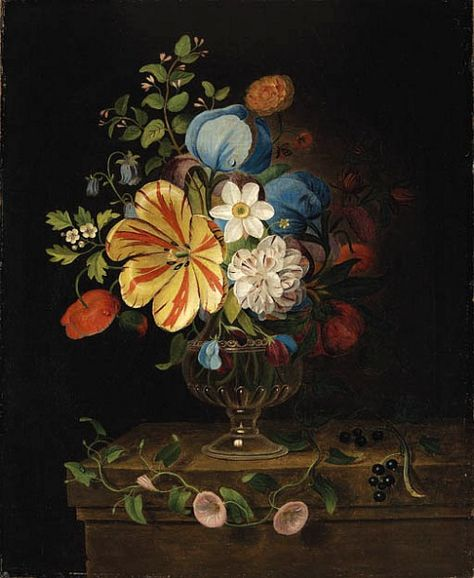
Flowers in a glass vase on a stone plinth

He married Petronilla Ekermans on 25 February 1765. Of their children a son called Frans (10 April 1776-30 November 1848) became an esteemed portrait painter.

Prince Charles of Lorraine, governor of the Austrian Netherlands appointed van Dorne as an ordinary painter, by letters patent dated 5 August 1779. In October 1800 van Dorne was, together with Pieter-Jozef Verhaghen, François Xavier Joseph Jacquin, Josse-Pieter Geedts, Frans Berges, Pieter Goyers and Antoon Clevenbergh, a co-founder of the Academy of Leuven.

Van Dorne was an amateur poet who composed occasional poetry at family feasts and meetings of artists. On the return to Belgium of the history painter Pieter-Jozef Verhaghen, who was also his friend, he described in a short didactic poem, all the works executed by the prolific artist Verhaghen.

He died in the Civil Hospital of Leuven on 2 May 1808.

== Work ==
Martin van Dorne mainly painted still lifes with flowers, butterflies and fruit. These works continue the late baroque tradition of Flemish still life painters such as Jan Baptist Bosschaert. A pair of still lifes in the M – Museum Leuven show still lifes of flowers in a vase on a pedestal with a view of a landscape in the background. There is also some fruit on the pedestal.
