= Pieter-Jozef Verhaghen =

Flemish painter

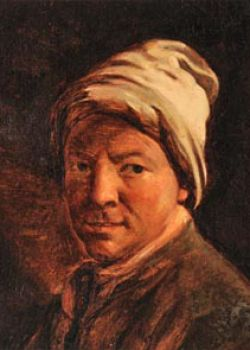
Self-portrait (date unknown)

Pieter-Jozef Verhaghen (Note: Variations and alternative spellings of name: Pieter Jozef Verhaghen, Pieter Jozef Verhaegen, Pieter-Jozef Verhaghen, P. J. Verhaegen, Pierre Joseph Verhagen, Pièrre Joseph Verhaghen, Pierre-Joseph Verhaegen, Pierre Joseph Verhaghen, Pietro Giuseppe Verhagen) (19 March 1728 in Aarschot – 3 April 1811 in Leuven) was a Flemish painter of large-scale religious and mythological scenes. He is regarded as the last representative of the so-called Flemish School of painting. In particular, he is seen as continuing the artistic tradition of Flemish Baroque painting as exemplified by Rubens in the late 18th century and into the 19th century. He was highly regarded during his lifetime and enjoyed the patronage of eminent patrons and religious institutions. He was appointed first court painter to Empress Maria Theresa of Austria who also provided him a stipend to travel abroad to further his artistic studies.

== Life ==
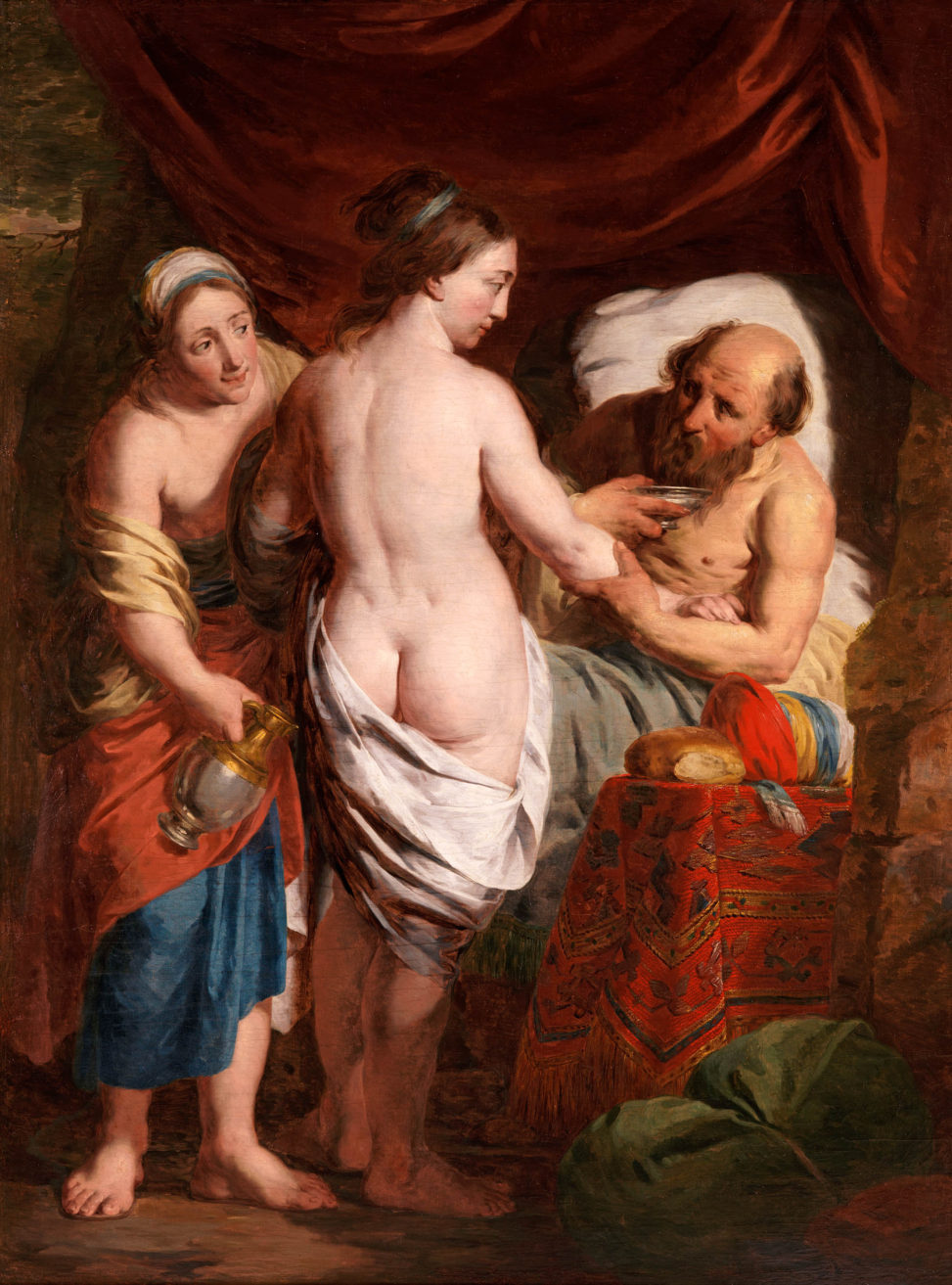
Lot and his daughters

Pieter-Jozef Verhaghen was born in Aarschot on 19 March 1728. Grandfather and father Verhaghen belonged to the notables of the city and practised as surgeons. The two sons of the family broke with the family tradition and opted to become painters. Jan-Jozef Verhaghen (1726-1795), older brother of Pieter-Jozef, is known in the history of 18th century painting as Potteke (little pot) Verhaghen, because in his works he often depicted kitchen utensils, pots and bowls of earthenware, copper and tin.

Pieter-Jozef Verhaghen thanked his artist career to a chance meeting. As a young boy, he very much enjoyed drawing. When in 1741 he learned that the traveling painter and art restorer Jan-Baptist van den Kerckhoven (c. 1709-1772) was working to restore a painting in the Church of Our Lady in Aarschot he showed van den Kerckhoven some of his drawings. Van den Kerckhoven immediately recognized the boy's artistic talent and convinced father Willem Verhaghen to let his son study the principles of painting. The young Verhaghen stayed with Van den Kerckhoven and travelled with him to other cities nearby working on decorations and restorations. When van den Kerckhoven was called to some job further away, Verhaghen was not allowed by his father to travel with him due to his young age. He spent the next two years studying art by making copies after prints. In 1744 he moved to Antwerp where he continued his training with Balthasar Beschey. Beschey was an upcoming painter who worked in the style of Rubens and even made direct copies after the famous Antwerp master. As part of his training in Beschey's workshop Verhaghen made studies after 17th-century works. He was simultaneously enrolled at the Royal Academy of Fine Arts in Antwerp where he learned to draw after models. His brother Jan-Jozef later also moved to Antwerp where he worked while taking art classes. In 1747 Pieter-Jozef left Antwerp to return to Aarschot to live with his parents.

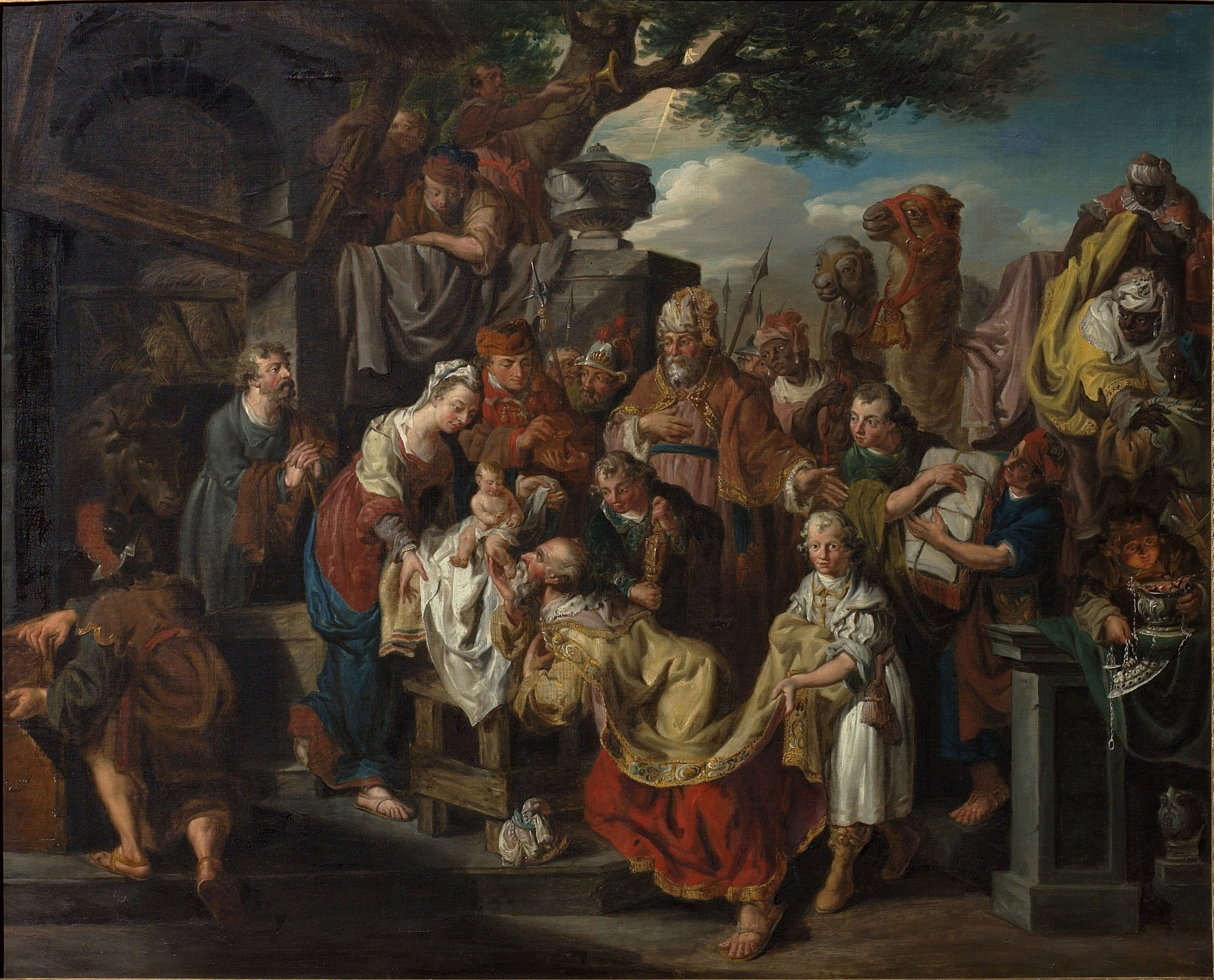
The adoration of the Magi

In 1749, he was summoned to Leuven where brewer Guilliam Vrancx asked him to decorate the salons of his house on the Mechelsestraat with decorative paintings in Louis XV style. Vrancx was an influential business man and later mayor of Leuven who provided the young artist with an excellent introduction to the bourgeois milieu in Leuven. Not long after his move to Leuven, Verhaghen met and fell in love with Johanna Hensmans, the daughter of a brandy distiller. Rather than return to Antwerp to take up his studies again, the artist decided to stay in Leuven where the couple were married in 1753. Seven children (four sons and three daughters) were the issue of this marriage. The couple settled in Leuven where Verhaghen opened a small workshop while his wife ran a yarn and linen shop. In 1754 the artist became formally a citizen of Leuven. In these early years of his career Verhaghen was mainly active as a decorative painter. He counted among his patrons members of the bourgeoisie as well as from the circle of the University of Leuven. For the University's graduates who were not from the aristocracy he painted coats of arms, which they could hang above their house door. He also started to receive commissions for larger works with religious themes, in which he was able to give free rein to his creativity. These works include 11 paintings for the chapel of Leuven University, two canvases for the chapter hall of the Park Abbey and a series of paintings for the Dominican church in Leuven. These works show that his artistic aspiration was to paint in the style of his artistic examples, Rubens and Gaspar de Crayer. He took de Crayer as his example as there were multiple works of this artist present in the churches of Leuven. He gradually also found patronage outside Leuven and its immediate surroundings and painted altarpieces for churches in Turnhout, Halle and Ghent. He was also active as a portrait painter.

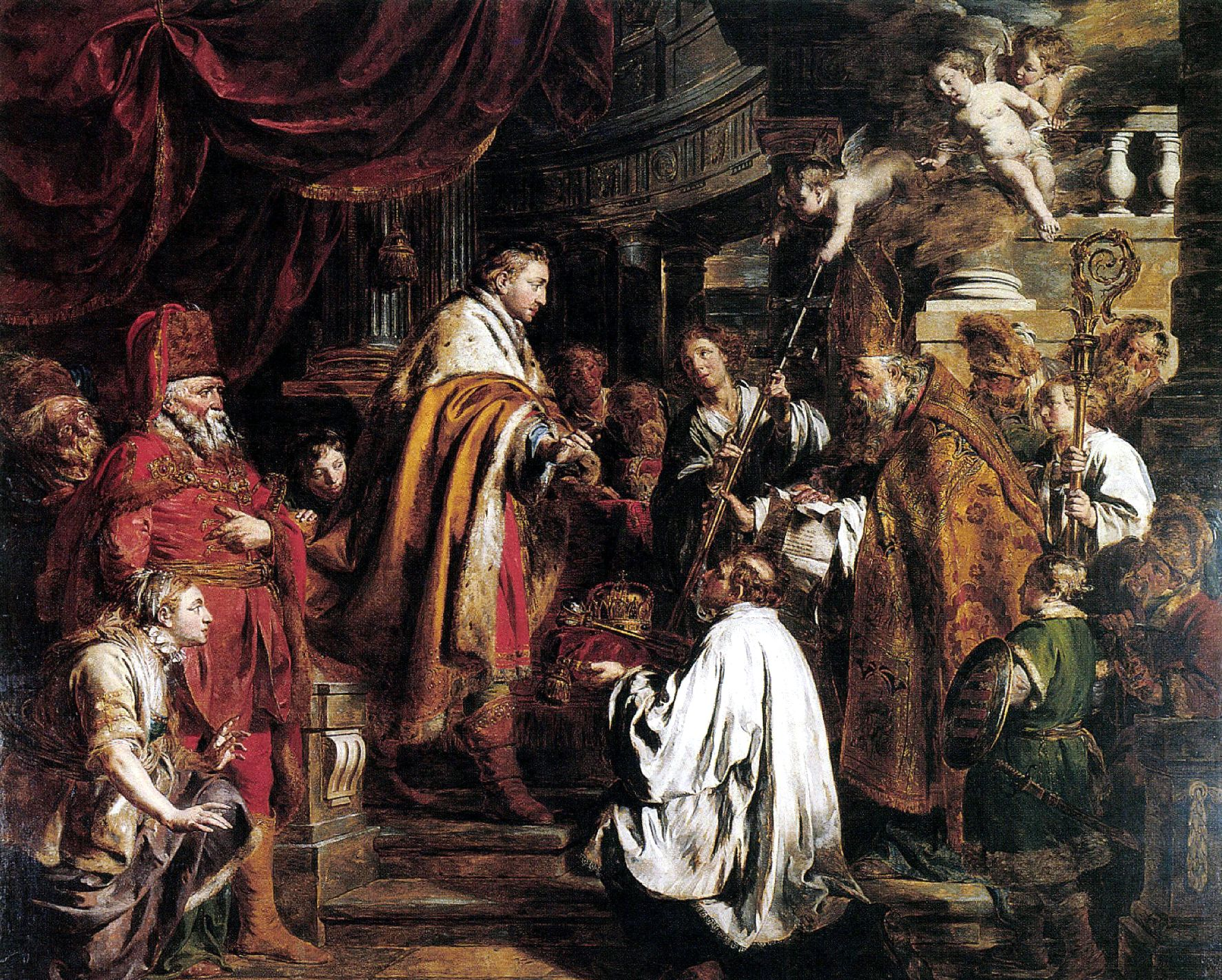
Hungarian king St Stephen receiving the Pope's envoys bringing him the crown

The Brussels banker and art lover Daniel Danoot introduced Pieter-Jozef Verhaghen to Prince Charles Alexander of Lorraine, Governor of the Austrian Netherlands. At the time Verhaghen had been working on a commission for the duke Karl von Koblenz depicting the Hungarian king St Stephen receiving the Pope's envoys bringing him the crown. When von Koblenz died before Verhaghen had delivered the commission, he offered the finished work to Prince Charles. Prince Charles wrote to Austrian Empress Empress Maria Theresa to ask for permission to purchase the work. The Austrian Empress Empress Maria Theresa agreed to the request and when she later was sent the work, she was taken by its qualities. She decided to support the artistic development of the artist by funding a study trip to Italy. He was awarded a stipend that would cover the living expenses of the artist and his family for a period of two years.

In May 1771 Verhaghen was made the ordinary painter of Prince Charles Alexander of Lorraine. In the same month he set out on his trip together with his eldest son Willem who would later become a priest. Travelling first to Paris he then continued via Lyon to Turin. Here he was received at the court of Sardinia. He then travelled on to Milan, Parma, Piacenza, Bologna to arrive in Rome at the beginning of August 1771. He stayed in Rome for one and a half years and visited Napels during that period. While in Rome, Pope Clement XIV granted the artist an audience and he offered plenary indulgence to him, his family in the third degree, and thirty other people of his choice. The pope also personally gave the artist's son Willem a tonsure.

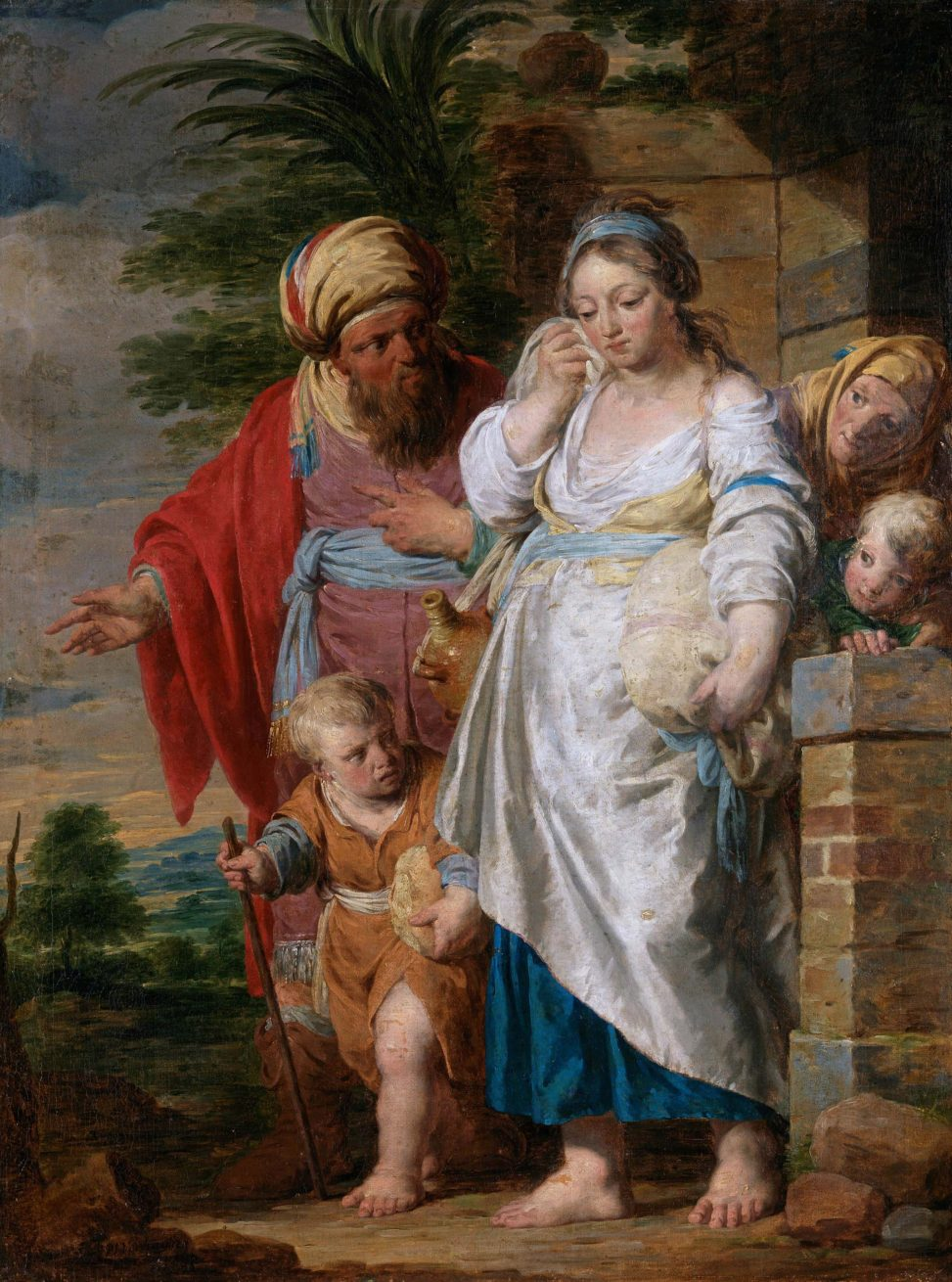
Hagar and Ishmael banished by Abraham

Subsequently Verhaghen travelled to Vienna via Tuscany and Venice. He arrived in Vienna on 9 June 1773. Here the Empress received him in audience two times. She honored him by bestowing the title of 'first court painter' on him. When he returned home in October 1773, he was welcomed as a kind of national hero in various cities, including his native city Aarschot, his hometown Leuven and Antwerp. The Leuven painter and poet Martin van Dorne composed a short didactic poem, in which he evoked all the works executed by the prolific Verhaghen. His reputation had increased enormously and many institutions wanted to own paintings by his hand. His reputation grew also outside his own country. His success were supported by his ability to paint quickly and his efficient workshop organization in which he followed the example of his teacher Balthasar Beschey.

Religious institutions were his most important customers, so his career suffered from the Austrian government's efforts to curb the influence of the Catholic Church. The invasion of the Southern Netherlands by French troops in the 1790s further affected the artist's career. Two of his sons, Willem, parish priest in Schaerbeek, and Joris-Jozef, canon of the Park Abbey had to shelter in the artist's home to escape persecution of the French administrators. After the Concordat of 1801 entered into between Napoleon and Pope Pius VII in 1801, the religious tensions decreased and Pieter-Jozef was able to get some new orders, especially from private individuals. But the time for his great historical compositions had passed.

After on 26 October 1800 artist from Leuven such as Martin van Dorne, François Xavier Joseph Jacquin, Josse-Pieter Geedts, Frans Berges, Gillis Goyers and Antoon Clevenbergh had established a society for the establishment of an academy in Leuven, Verhaghen was elected its honorary director. After suffering a stroke in 1809, the artist was no longer to work in the last years of his life. He also lost his oldest son and wife in the year 1810.

By the time he died on 3 April 1811, the interest in his work had been in decline for a while.

== Work ==
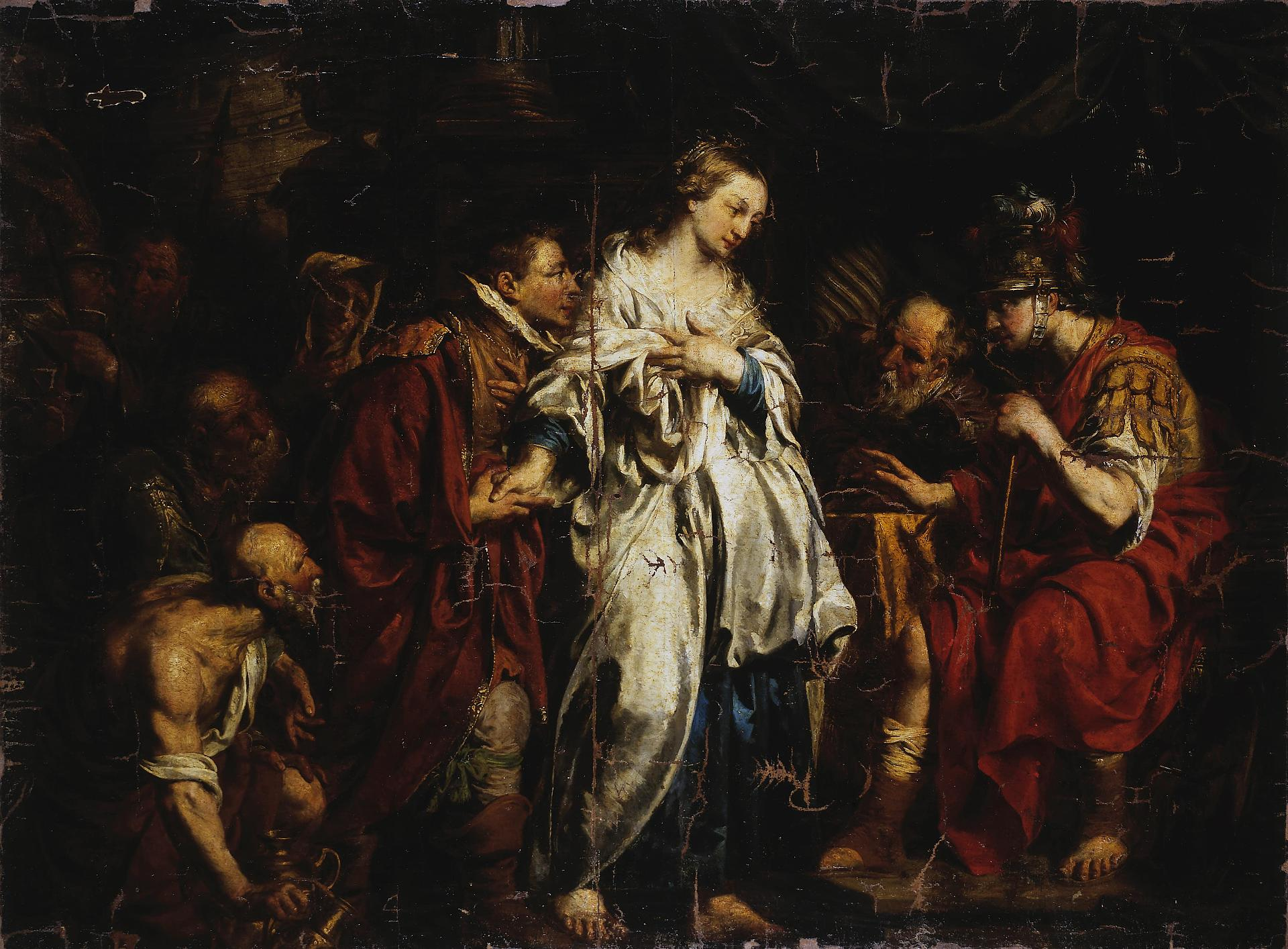
The magnanimity of Scipio Africanus

Verhaghen was a very prolific painter who created religious and mythological compositions as well as some portraits. He painted over 300 works during his lifetime and was thus one of the most productive painters of the Austrian Netherlands. The master excelled mainly in his large history paintings for which he was in demand throughout Flanders. He was less successful as a portrait painter since his creations were deemed not to produce good likenesses to the sitters. The portraits of abbot Simon Wouters van der Park Abbey and Adriaan Trudo Salé of Averbode Abbey are rare examples of Verhaghen's portrait work. Both portraits date from 1779 and show the abbots in their study room or library. The abbots are depicted with the symbols of their religious status. He was appreciated in his time as a great colorist and one of the most important painters working in the Southern Netherlands.

Stylistically he is regarded as one of the last members of the Flemish Baroque and his style is indebted to the works of the great Flemish masters of the 17th century such as Rubens, van Dyck, Jordaens and Caspar de Crayer. He thus sided with other artists of his time such as Willem Jacob Herreyns who continued the Flemish tradition of the Antwerp school against artists such as Cornelis Cels who sought inspiration in new artistic currents such as the Academic style popularized in France.

Many of his works are still on display at many churches and religious institutions throughout Belgium including the Saint Quentin's Church in Leuven, Averbode Abbey and Park Abbey in Heverlee.
