= Cornelis Biltius =

Dutch painter

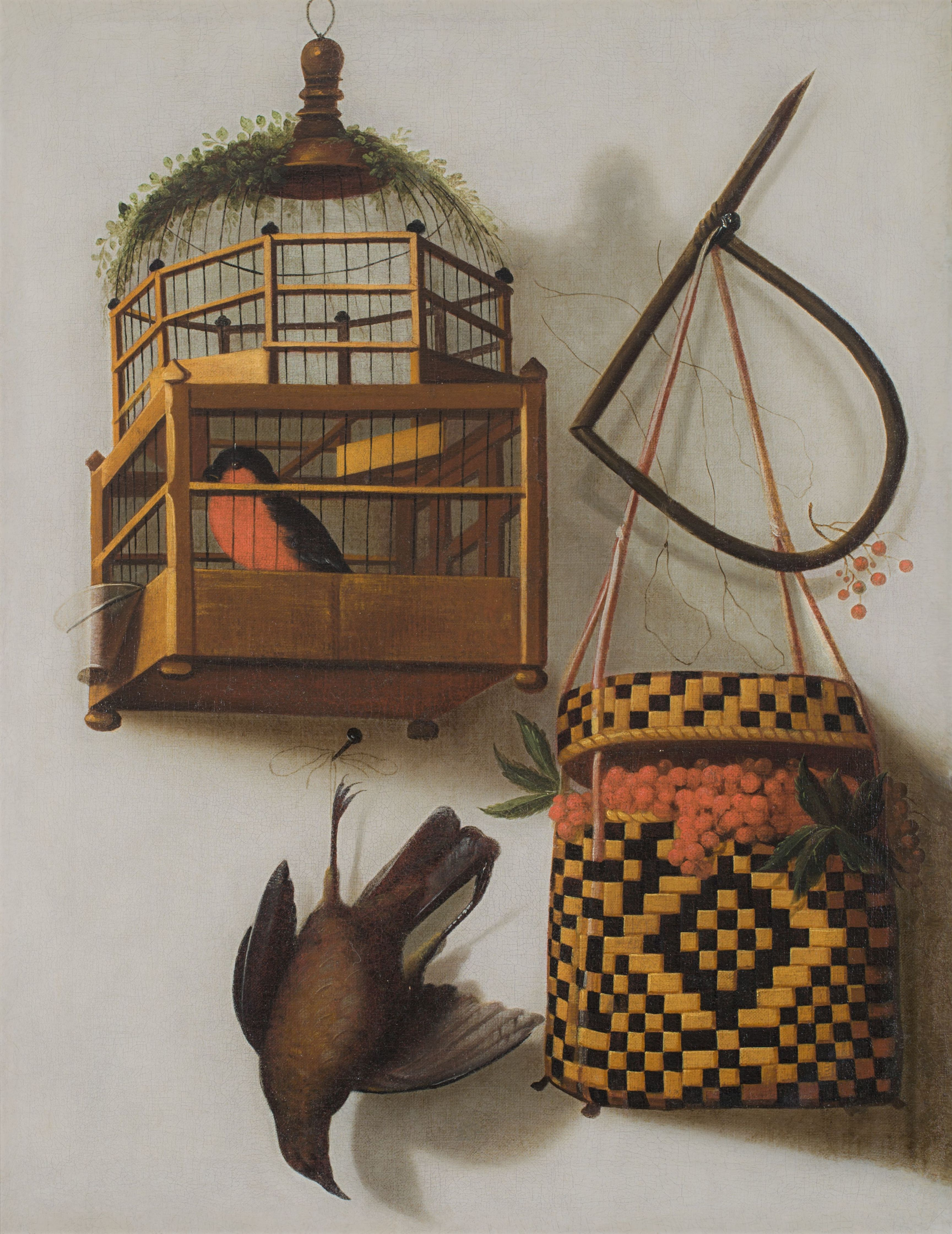
Trompe l'oeil with a bird cage

Cornelis Biltius or Cornelius Biltius (The Hague, baptized 12 November 1653 – in or after 1686) was a Dutch still life painter originally from The Hague who worked in various locations in Germany. He was known for his trompe-l'œil still lifes of game, hunting equipment, kitchen still lifes and letter racks close to the style of his father Jacob Biltius.

== Life ==
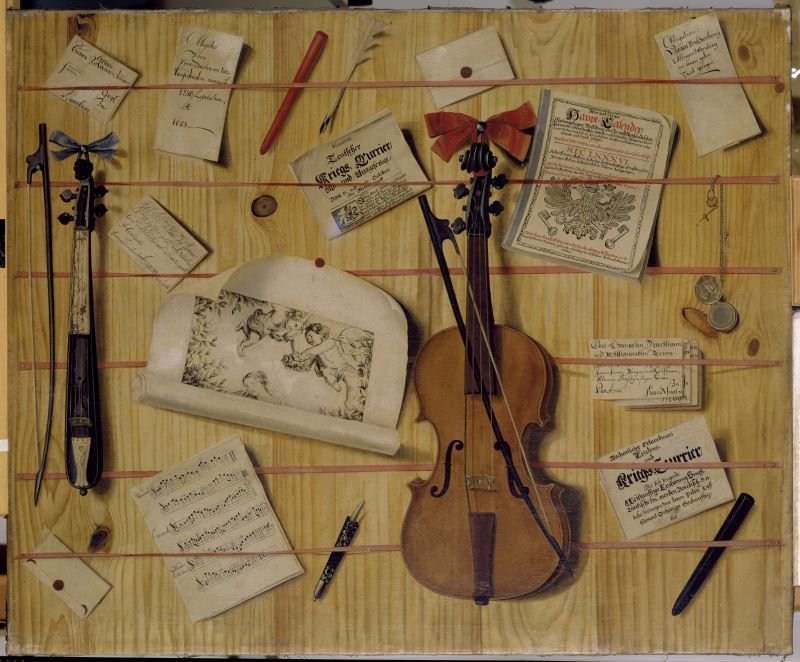
Quodlibet with violin and documents

Cornelis Biltius was born in The Hague as the first-born child of Jacob Biltius and Adriana Proot van der Jeucht. His father was a still life painter originally from Middelburg. He would later have seven more siblings of whom Bartholomeus also became a painter.

While he was growing up his family moved a lot. In 1661, the Biltius family moved to Amsterdam, where it settled until 1666. Between 1666 and 1670 the family resided in Maastricht. In 1671 the family returned for a few months to Amsterdam, but then moved to Flanders and settled in Antwerp. His parents joined in Antwerp the secret society of local Calvinists, 'de Consistorie van de Brabantsche Olijfberg' (Consistory of the Olive Mountain of Brabant).

Cornelis likely trained with his father. From the 1670s he is active in Germany including in Bonn, Cologne and Ehrenbreitstein (Fort). In the period from 1680 to 1686 he worked in Würzburg, Nuremberg and possibly Bamberg. Cornelis Biltius was in the service of the Oberhofmeister of the Electorate of Trier von Bronsar between 1680 and 1686. He received a monthly stipend from the Oberhofmeister.

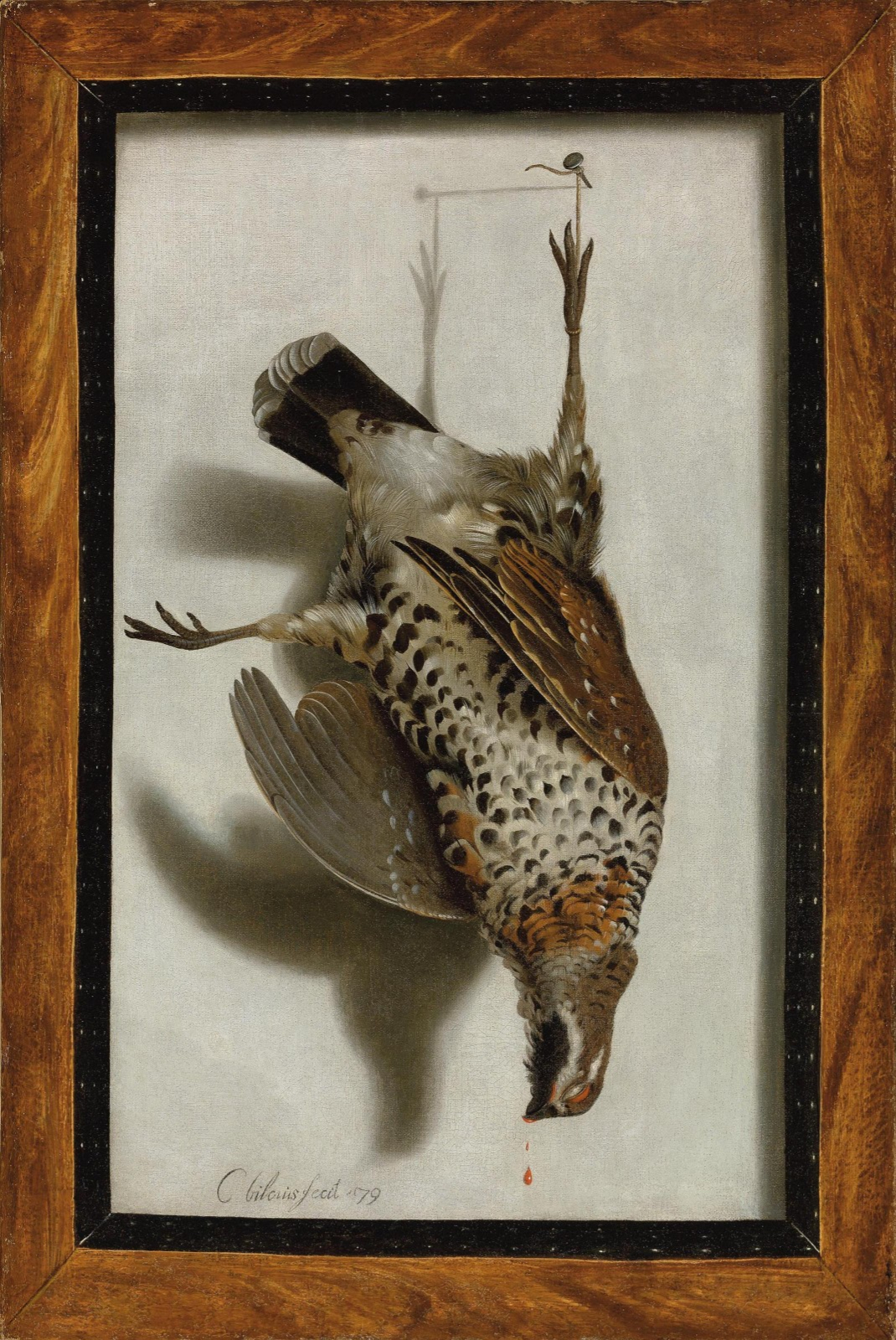
Trompe l'oeil with a grouse hanging from a nail

He died in or after 1686, probably in Germany.

== Work ==
Cornelis Biltius was a still life specialist known for his trompe-l'œil still lifes of game, hunting equipment, kitchen still lifes and letter racks. He signed 'C. bilcius', sometimes the first name in full 'Cornelius' or in short 'Corn:' His dated works are from the period 1672 to 1686. His large-scale canvases were used as wall decorations for castles in Germany such as the Brühl Palaces.

Biltius created mainly trompe l'oeil compositions which are clearly influenced by similar works of his father. Examples of illusionistic effects in his works are the trompe-l'œil frames, the shade cast by objects on the canvas and the hyperrealist rendering of falling plumes and the dripping of blood of suspended game birds.
