= Jacob Biltius =

Dutch painter

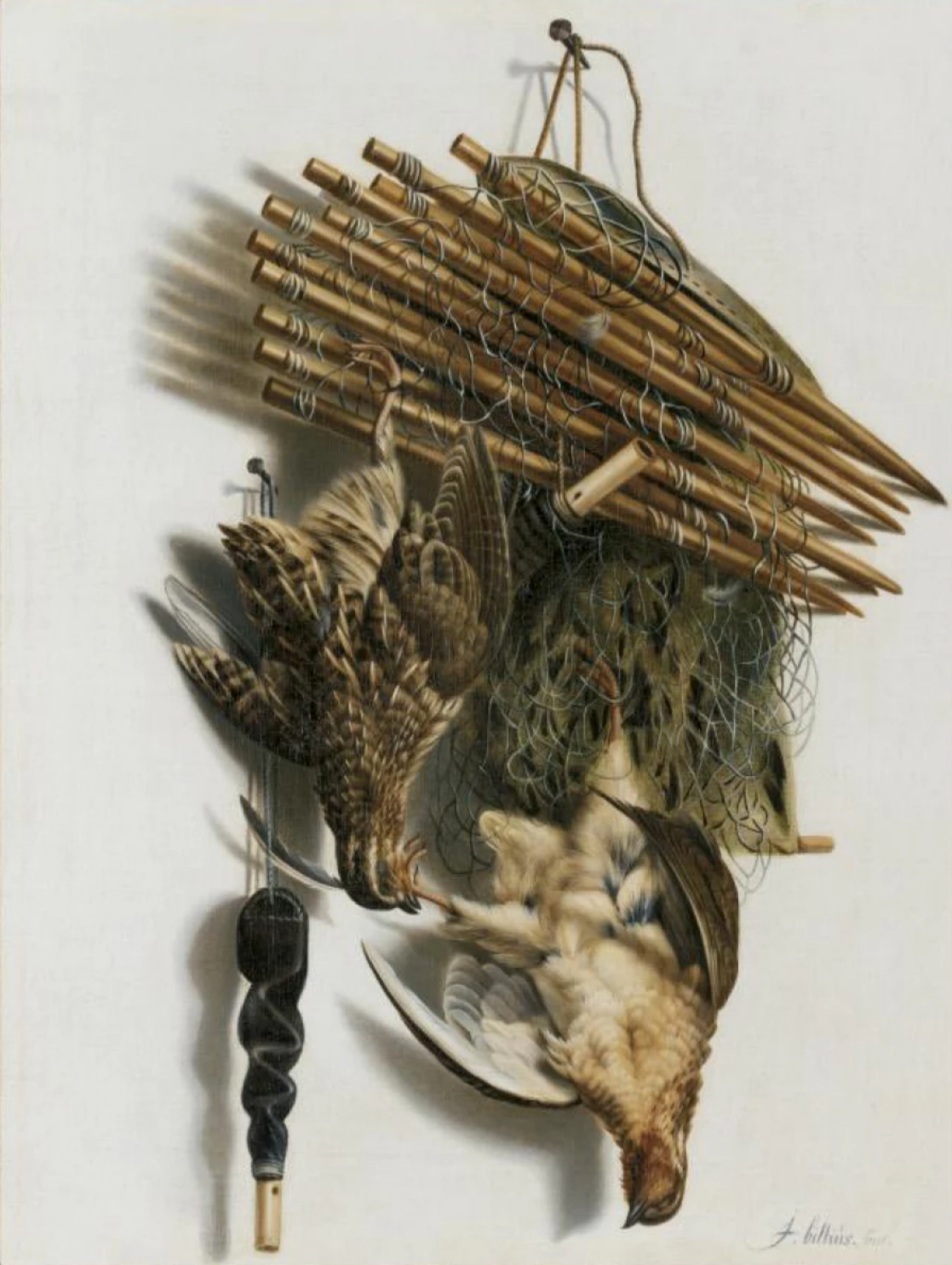
Trompe l’oeil with quails, kingfisher, bird net and whistle

Jacob Biltius or Jacobus Biltius (The Hague, baptized 27 November 1633 – Bergen op Zoom, 8 February 1681) was a Dutch still life painter originally from The Hague who worked in various places including The Hague, Amsterdam, Maastricht, Antwerp, Leeuwarden and Bergen op Zoom. He was known for his game still lifes, kitchen still lifes and trompe-l'œil still lifes.

== Life ==
Jacob Biltius was born in The Hague as the son of Bartholomeus Bilt and an unknown mother. The profession of his father is not known. He was baptized on 27 November 1633. He studied in The Hague under the obscure French painter Carel Hardy around 1651 and later with Pieter de Putter, a painter known for his fish still lifes. Biltius was admitted in 1660 to the Confrerie Pictura, which was founded in 1656 by local painters, who were unsatisfied by The Hague Guild of St Luke.

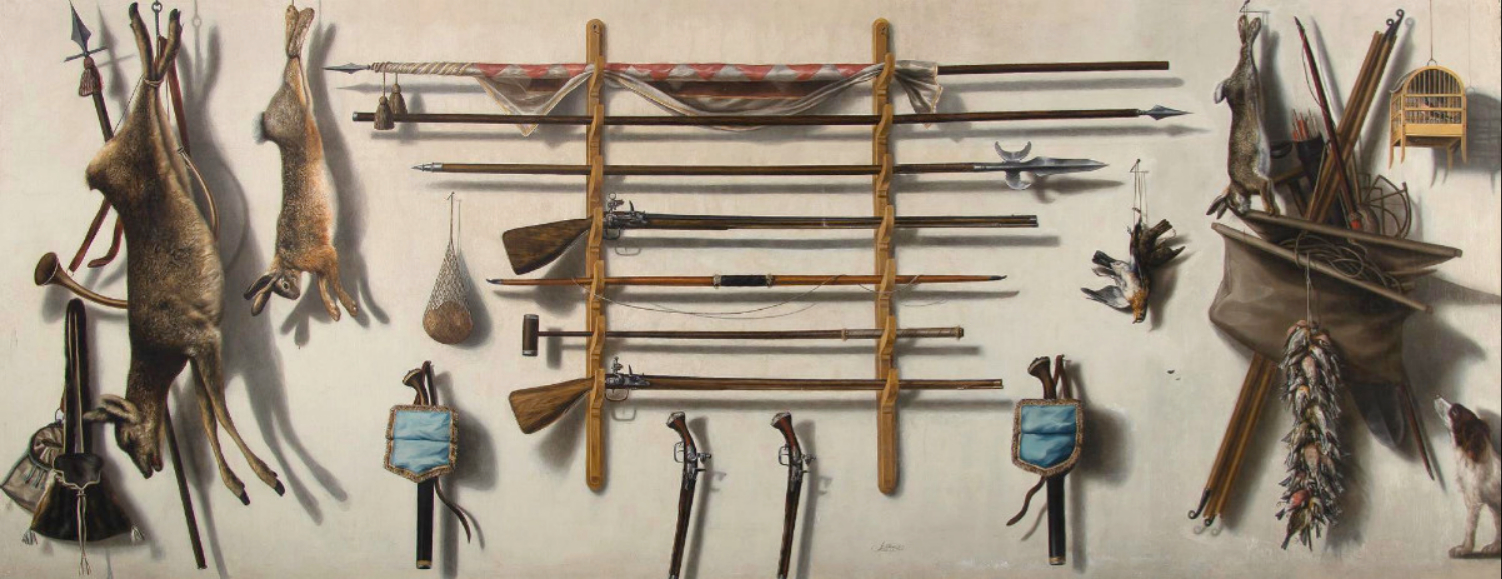
Trompe l’oeil of an arms rack, game and dog and other objects hanging on a wall

He married Adriana Proot van der Jeucht in 1653. The couple had 8 children of whom Cornelis and Bartholomeus became painters. In 1661, Biltius moved to Amsterdam, where he remained until 1666. Between 1666 and 1670 he was active in Maastricht.

In 1671 he returned for a few months to Amsterdam, but then moved to Flanders, settling in Antwerp with his family. In the same year Biltius and his wife joined the secret society of local Calvinists, 'de Consistorie van de Brabantsche Olijfberg' (Consistory of the Olive Mountain of Brabant). The Consistorie's best known member was the Flemish painter Jacob Jordaens whose house was the venue where its members congregated between 1674 until his death in 1678. The Calvinists also gathered in Biltius’ Antwerp home on a few occasions. He was admitted to the Antwerp Guild of St Luke in the Guild year 1672–1673. He remained active in Antwerp until 1678.

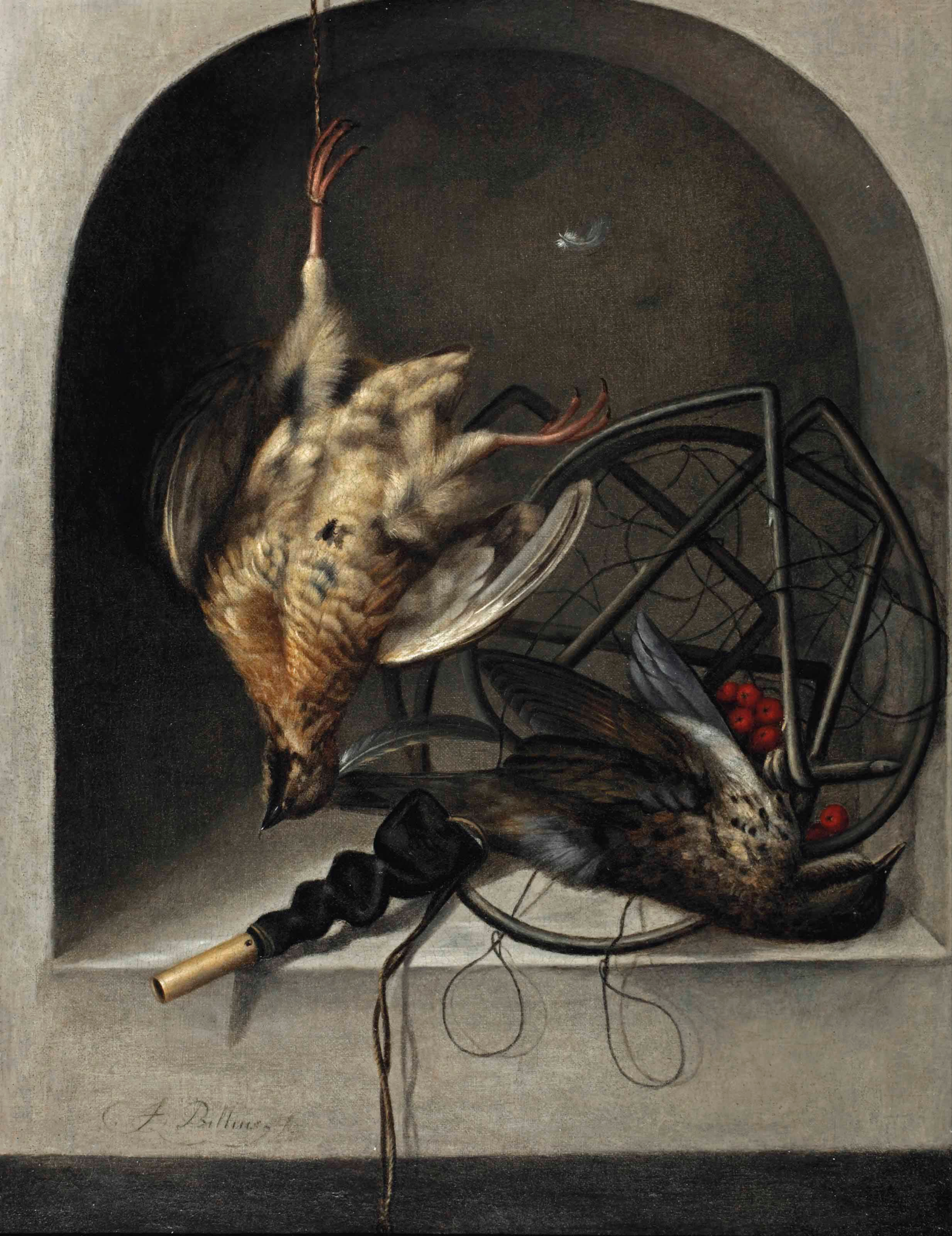
A partridge suspended from a nail, a starling, a trap and whistle in a stone niche

Biltius later moved to Bergen op Zoom where he died in 1681.

== Work ==
He was known for his still lifes of game, kitchen still lifes and, in particular, for his trompe-l'œil still lifes.

By the middle of the 17th century, hunting still lifes had become very popular in the Dutch Republic. As an increasing number of Dutch people had become prosperous, they wished to display in their sumptuous country houses hunting still lifes, which expressed their high social status even though Dutch burghers were not allowed to hunt unless they were of the nobility.

Biltius created many trompe l'oeil compositions between 1663 and 1677. He was a pioneer in creating the illusion of three dimensional objects in these works. Jan Weenix and Melchior d'Hondecoeter also painted trompe l'oeil still lifes often representing game birds hanging in a niche or against a monochrome wall. Biltius’ trompe l'oeil compositions show a very accurate and precise representation of nature. As it was common in Dutch households of the time to have birds actually suspended in their homes, the illusionistic works of Biltius would likely have confounded the viewer thus achieving their desired effect. Some of these works were of a large size, adding to their realism and illusionistic impact.
