= Josse-Pieter Geedts =

Belgian historical painter

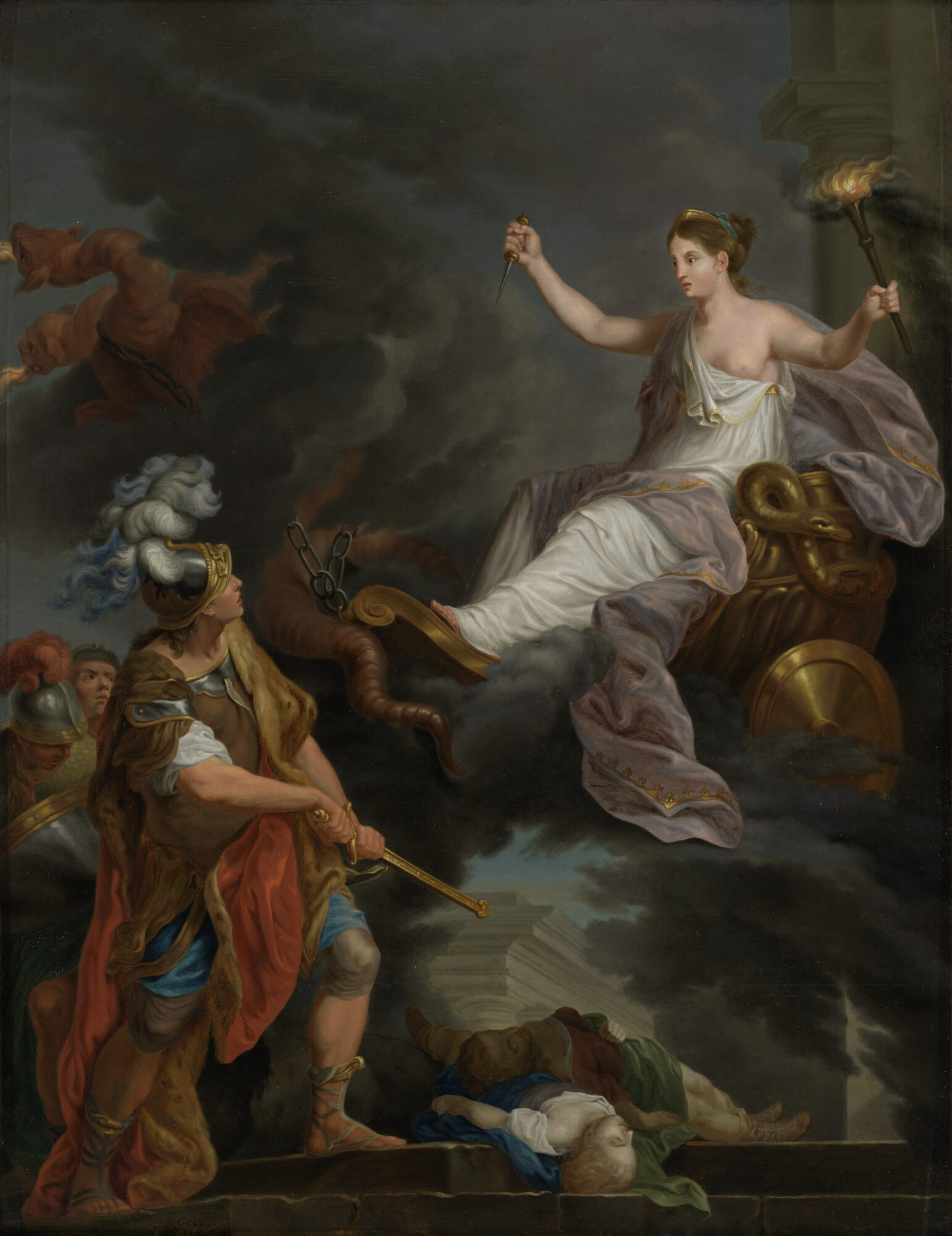
De wraak

Josse-Pieter or Pierre Joseph Geedts (1770–1834), a Belgian historical painter, born at Louvain, studied at the Antwerp Academy under Herreyns. In 1800 he was appointed one of the professors of the new Academy of Louvain, which post he held till 1833, when he was, as he always considered, unjustly dismissed. He died at Louvain in 1834. His best works are a Calvary, and The Archbishop of Cologne delivering a miraculous host to an Augustine Monk; the latter is in the Sint-Jacobskerk .
