= Gillis Backereel =

Flemish painter

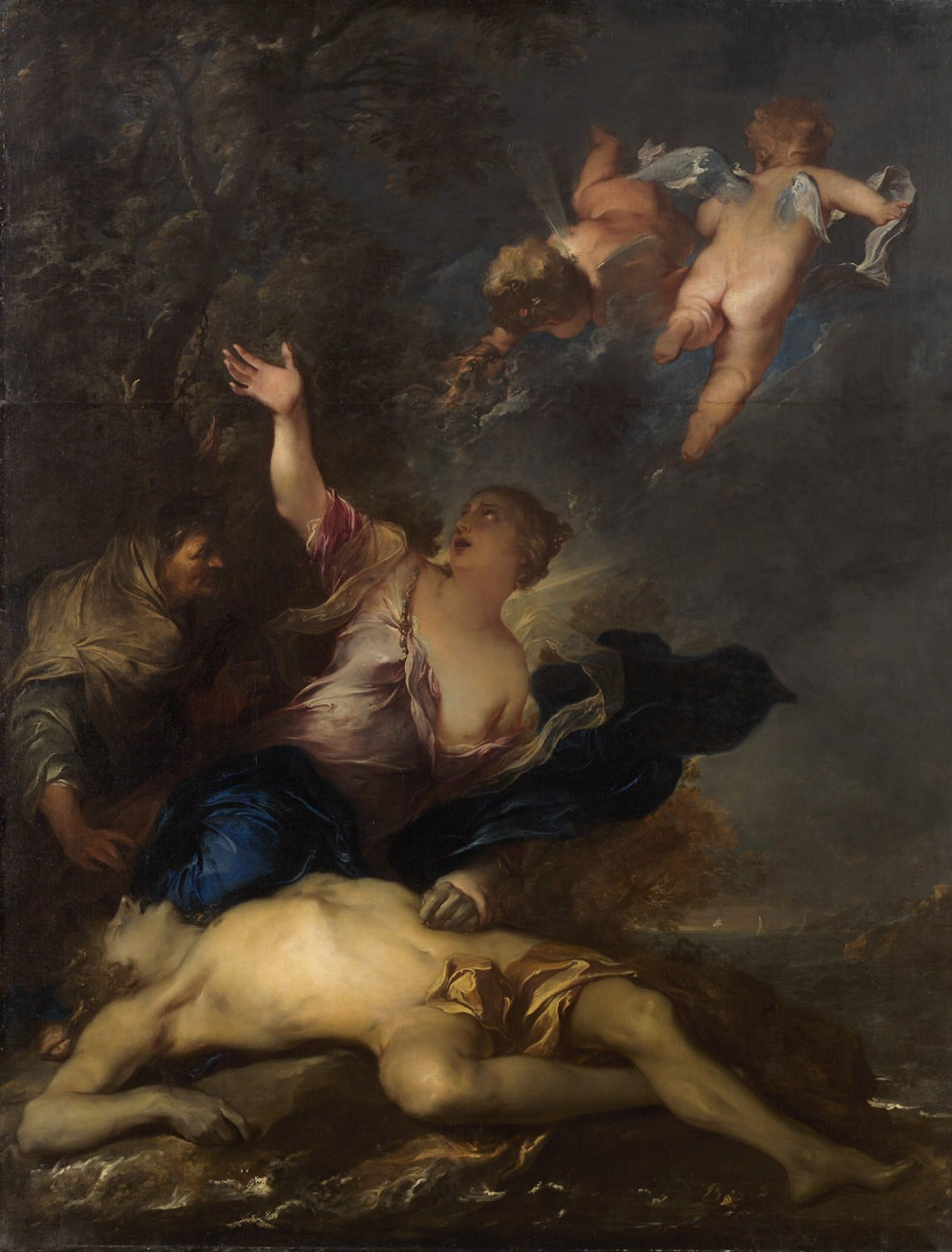
Hero mourns the dead Leander

Gillis Backereel (1572 or 1610/1612 – between 1654 and 1662) was a Flemish painter of history subjects. The artist was principally active in Antwerp where he produced various compositions for the local churches as well as mythological compositions.

== Life ==
Details about the life of Gillis Backereel are sketchy and disputed. It was traditionally believed that he was born in Antwerp in 1572 or at the end of the 16th century. It is more likely that he was born c. 1610-1612 since the artist was recorded in Rome as being 24 years old both in 1634 and in 1636. It is possible that the birth dates of two artists with the same name who were possibly relatives of different generations (father and son?) have been mixed up. The Dutch art historian Godefridus Johannes Hoogewerff identified an 'Egidio de Bacchare' who lived on Strada Paolina in Rome and was buried in the cemetery of Campo Santo on 7 September 1626 with Gillis Backereel. Possibly this Egidio was the elder namesake.

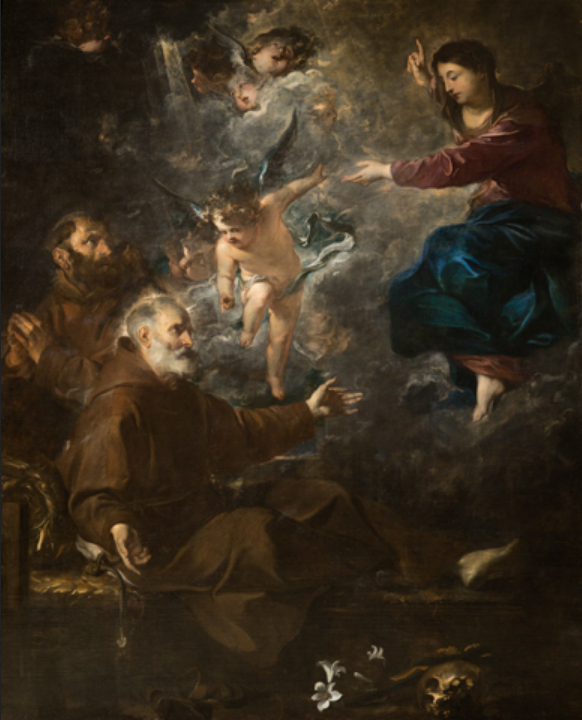
The Vision of Saint Felix

The early Dutch biographer Arnold Houbraken reported that the Backereel family produced a number of artists and that Joachim von Sandrart mentioned seven or eight artists from the Backereel family that he knew personally. Today Gillis is one of only three Backereel family members whose life is reasonably documented. The other two are Willem Backereel and Jacques Backereel. Willem Backereel enjoyed a reputation as a landscape painter. He had moved to Rome where he died young. This Willem possibly was a brother of the elder Gillis Backereel (born in 1572) rather than of the Gillis Backereel discussed in this article.

There is no record of Gillis Backereel's training. He became a master in the Antwerp Guild of St Luke in the guild year commencing on 18 September 1629 and ending on 18 September 1630. He is known to have travelled to Italy where he resided in Rome. The dates of his stay are not known with certainty and estimates vary from prior to 1630 (but this earlier date may refer to the elder namesake) to the period between 1634 and 1642. On 2 June 1642 he acted in Rome as the godfather at the baptism of Egidio van Vilvoorden, a son of the Flemish painter Jan van Vilvoorden.

He lived a relatively quiet and secluded life after his return to Antwerp. In the guild year 1651-1652 he employed four apprentices including Dominicus Beselaer, Pier Maille, Francis de Crayer and Frans (François) de Hase. The latter was hired without pay in return for receiving his training from Backereel.

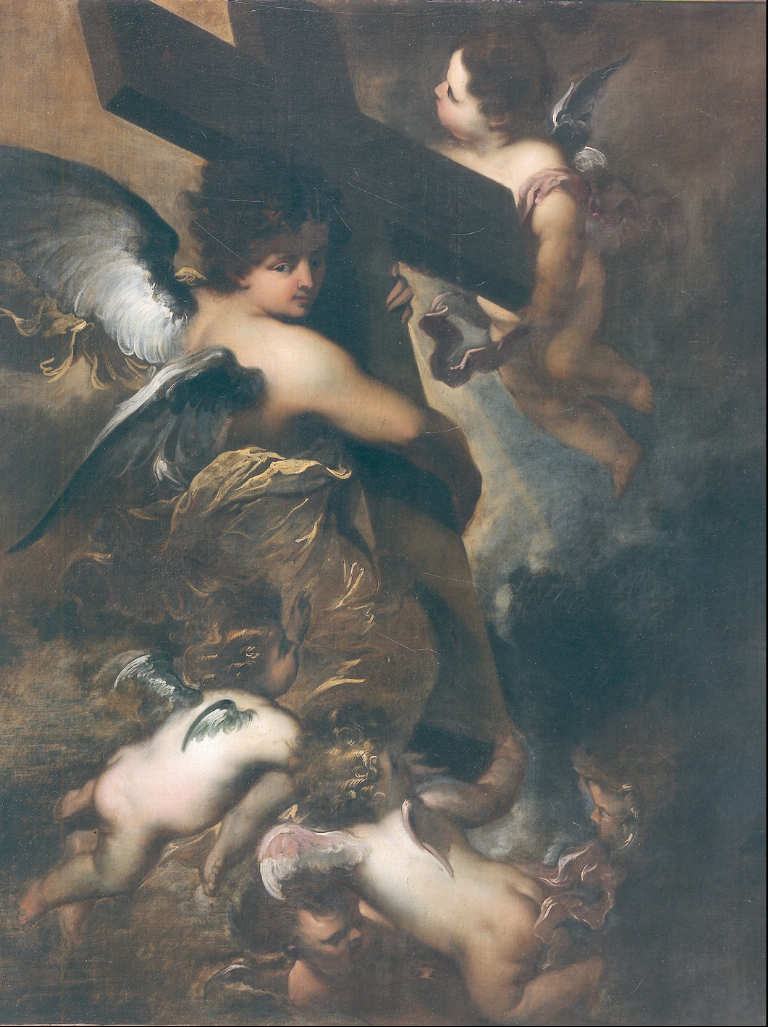
Angels with the Cross

The date of Gillis' death is not recorded but is believed to have occurred between 1654 and 1662.

== Work ==
Not many of Backereel's works have been preserved. They all depict religious and mythological subject matter.

His Adoration of the Shepherds and Vision of Saint Felix are in the Royal Museums of Fine Arts of Belgium in Brussels and his Hero mourns the dead Leander in the Kunsthistorisches Museum in Vienna.

Backereel provided the design for an engraving by Wenceslaus Hollar representing Bruno of Cologne published in 1649.
