= Mountainous River Landscape with Travelers =

Painting by Paul Bril

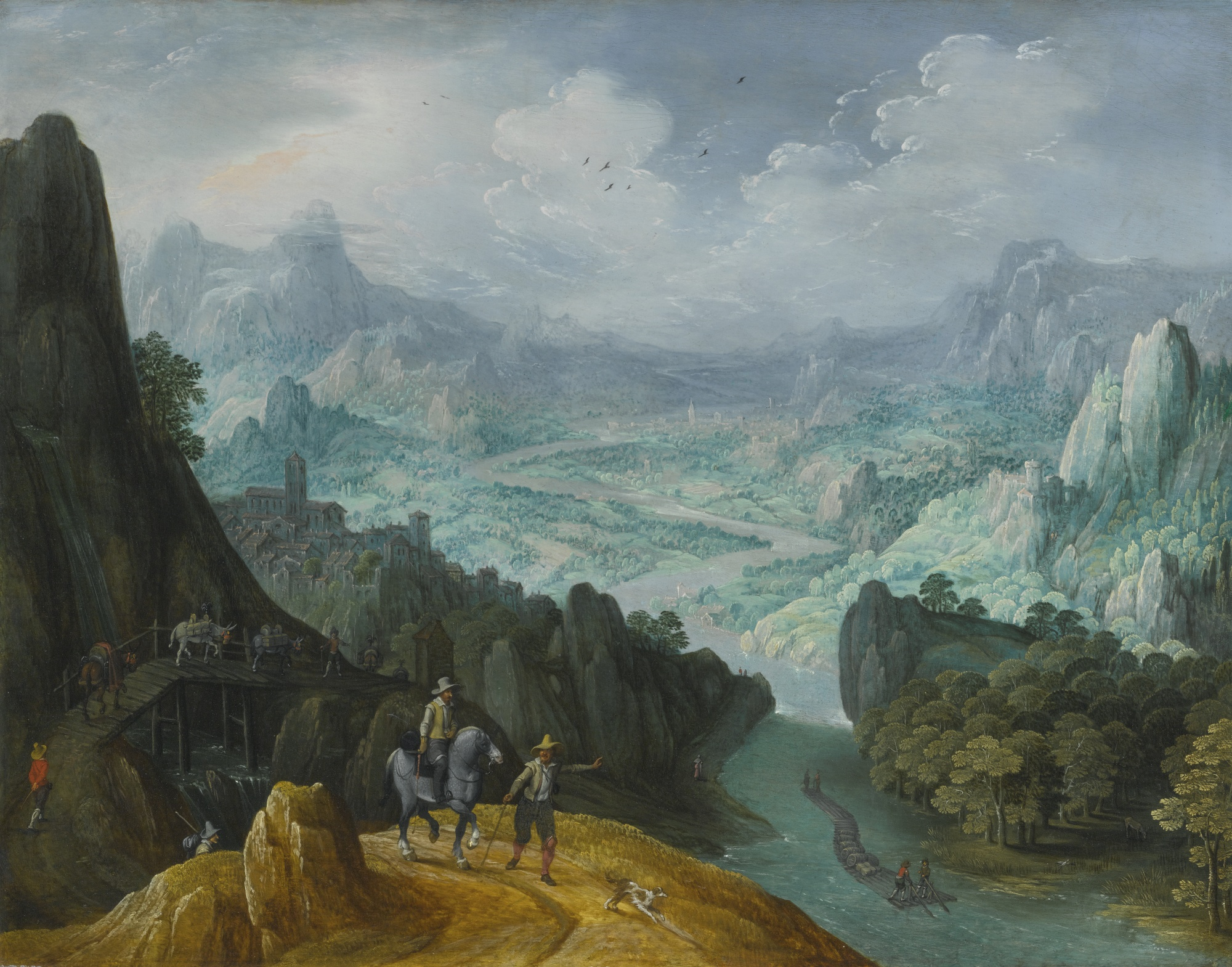
- Artist: Tobias Verhaecht
- Year: Early 17th century
- Medium: Oil on panel
- Dimensions: 51.4 cm × 67.9 cm (20.2 in × 26.7 in)
- Location: Private collection, Unknown

Mountainous River Landscape with Travelers is an early-17th-century oil painting on panel by Flemish painter Tobias Verhaecht. The painting was sold to an unknown buyer at Sotheby's in New York City, on January 26, 2016.

== Painting ==
The panoramic mountainous landscape "punctuated by rocky outcrops" is typical of Verhaecht. His painting adhered to the Weltlandschaft tradition started by Joachim Patinir and Pieter Bruegel the Elder. This was characterized by imaginary panoramic landscape seen from an elevated viewpoint, mountains and lowlands, water, and often buildings. Characteristic of Weltlandschaft were also attention to detail and staffage figures dwarfed by their fantastical surroundings. In his youth, Verhaecht reportedly traveled to Italy, where Francesco I de' Medici, Grand Duke of Tuscany became his patron in Florence. He then moved on to Rome where he painted landscape frescos. He returned to Antwerp by 1590. This oil on panel was realized upon Verhaecht's return to Antwerp.
