= Tobias Verhaecht =

Belgian painter

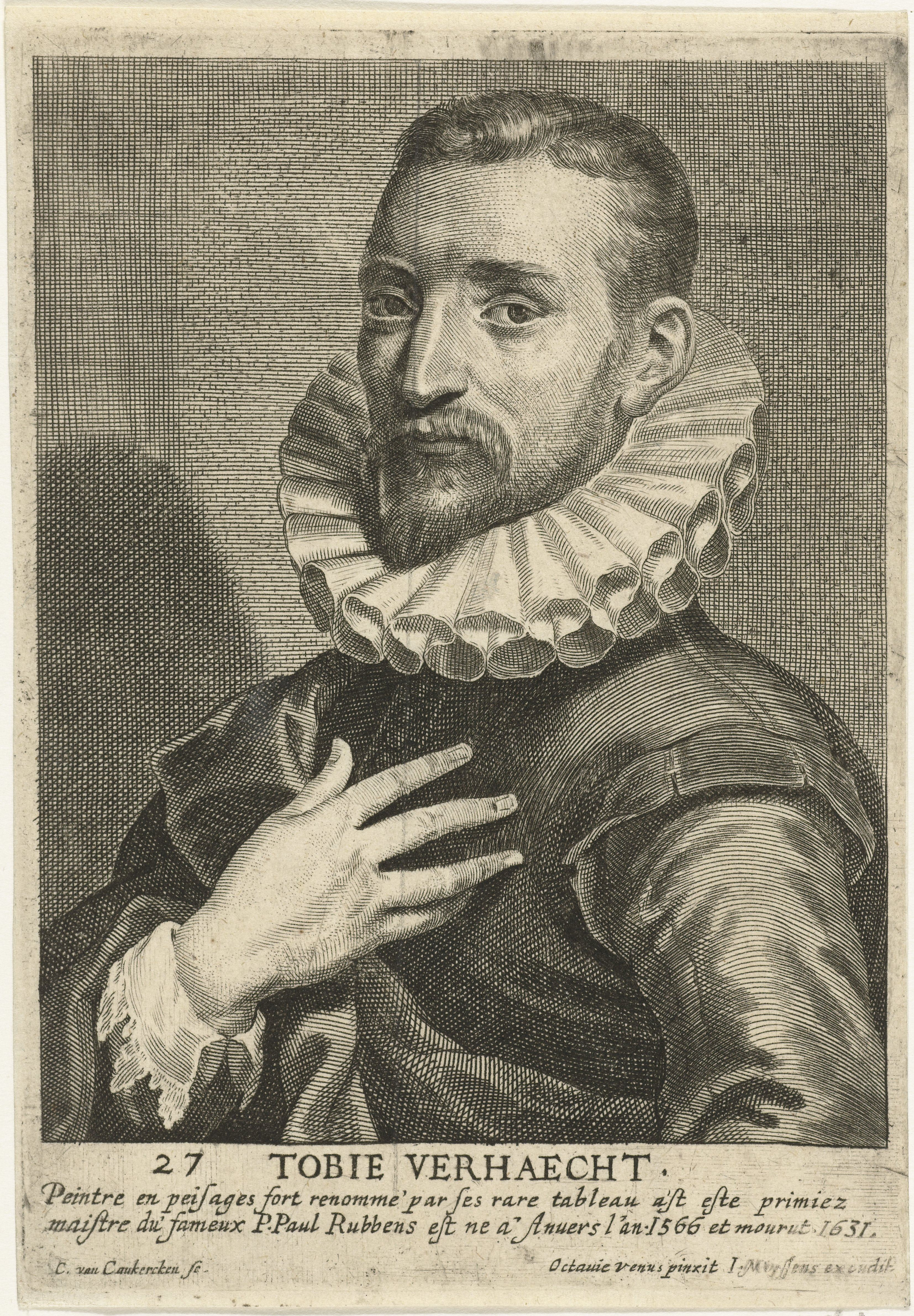
Portrait of Tobias Verhaecht

Tobias Verhaecht (1561–1631) was a painter from Antwerp in the Duchy of Brabant who primarily painted landscapes. His style was indebted to the mannerist world landscape developed by artists like Joachim Patinir and Pieter Bruegel the Elder. He was the first teacher of Pieter Paul Rubens.

== Life ==
Tobias Verhaecht was born in Antwerp as the son of Cornelis van Haecht. His father must also have been an artist as Verhaecht was admitted to the Antwerp Guild of St Luke as the son of a master.

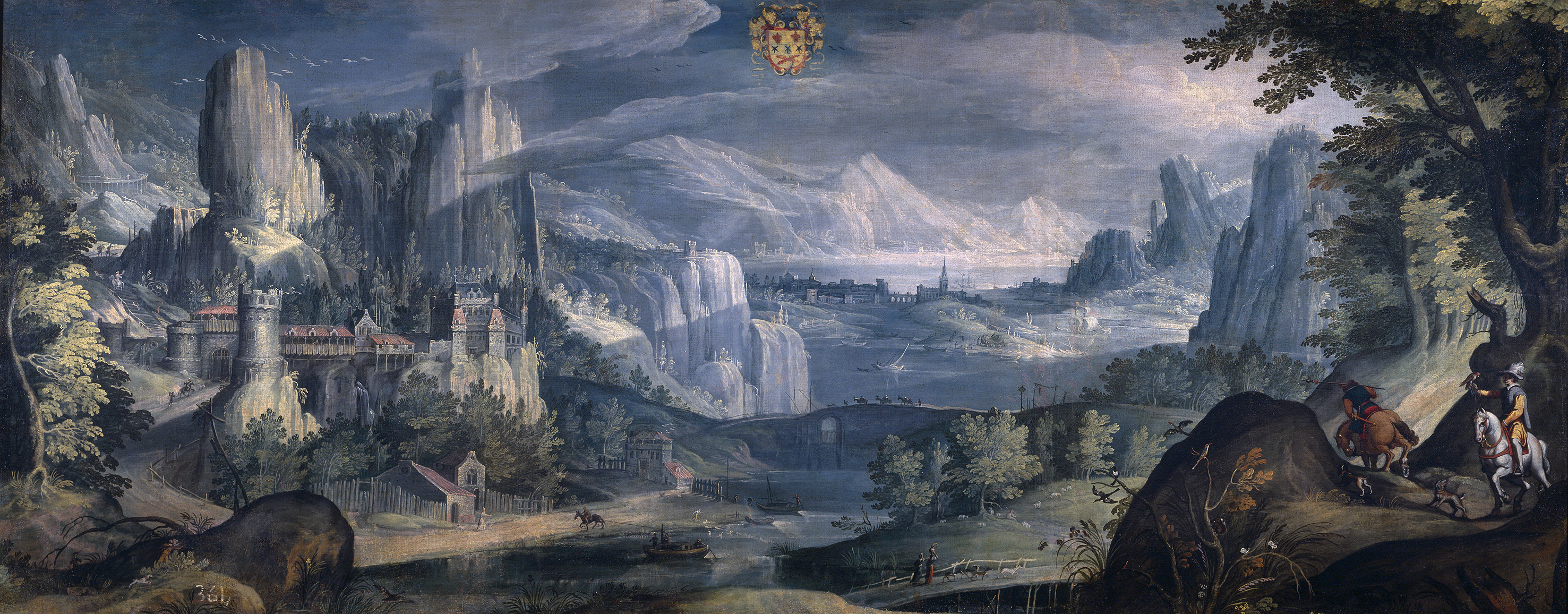
Alpine Landscape

It is not recorded with whom he studied. Before 1590 he travelled to Italy and first worked in Florence where Francesco I de' Medici, Grand Duke of Tuscany was his patron. He then moved on to Rome where he was active as a painter of landscape frescos. He returned to Antwerp where he became a master of the Guild of St. Luke in 1590–91.

Not long after he married Suzanna van Mockenborch, who was the granddaughter of Peter Paul Rubens' stepfather Jan de Landmetere, and a cousin of his mother. The couple had two sons Cornelis and Willem and one daughter Suzanna. His wife died in 1595 after the birth of their daughter. This happened during a difficult financial period for Verhaecht when he had also been appointed deacon of the Guild.

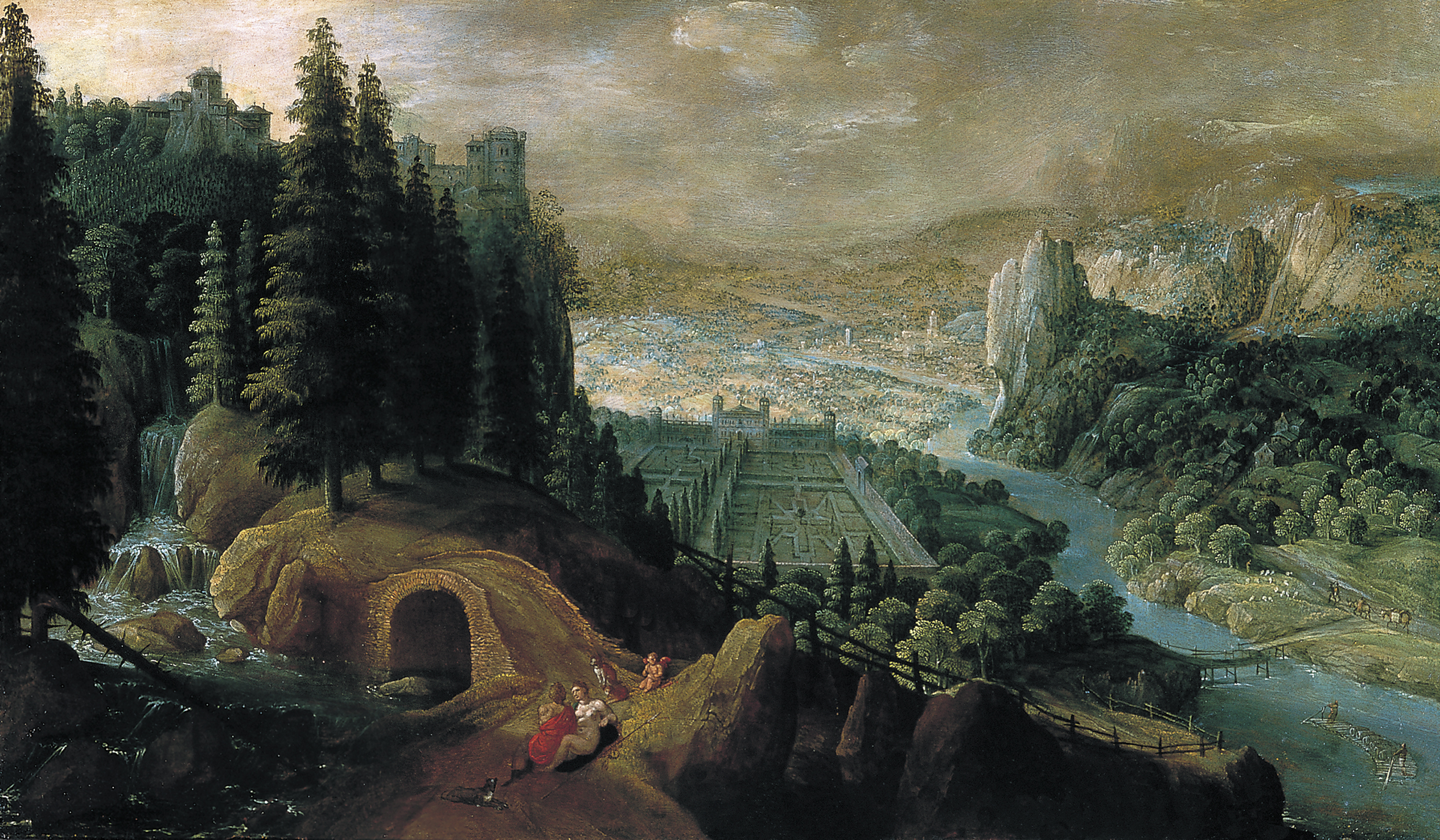
Landscape with Venus and Adonis

The year following the death of his first wife, he married Esther Pamphi, whose sister Maria married the battle painter Sebastiaen Vrancx. The couple had one more son and daughter. His second wife died in 1612. Verhaecht suffered more family drama with the death of his first-born Cornelis in 1614 and of his daughter Suzanna in 1623.

Verhaecht was a member of the Violieren, a local Chamber of rhetoric connected to the Antwerp Guild of St Luke for which he wrote a comedy in 1620.

He was the first teacher of Rubens who studied with him around 1592 for about two years but left because his interest was history painting and not landscape. His other pupils included his son Willem van Haecht, Jacques Backereel, Marten Ryckaert, Geeraert van Beemel, Adriaen Daep, Leonhard Cemp, Cornelis Bol, Pieter van den Hoeck and Abraham Matthys.

The artist died in Antwerp in 1631.

== Work ==
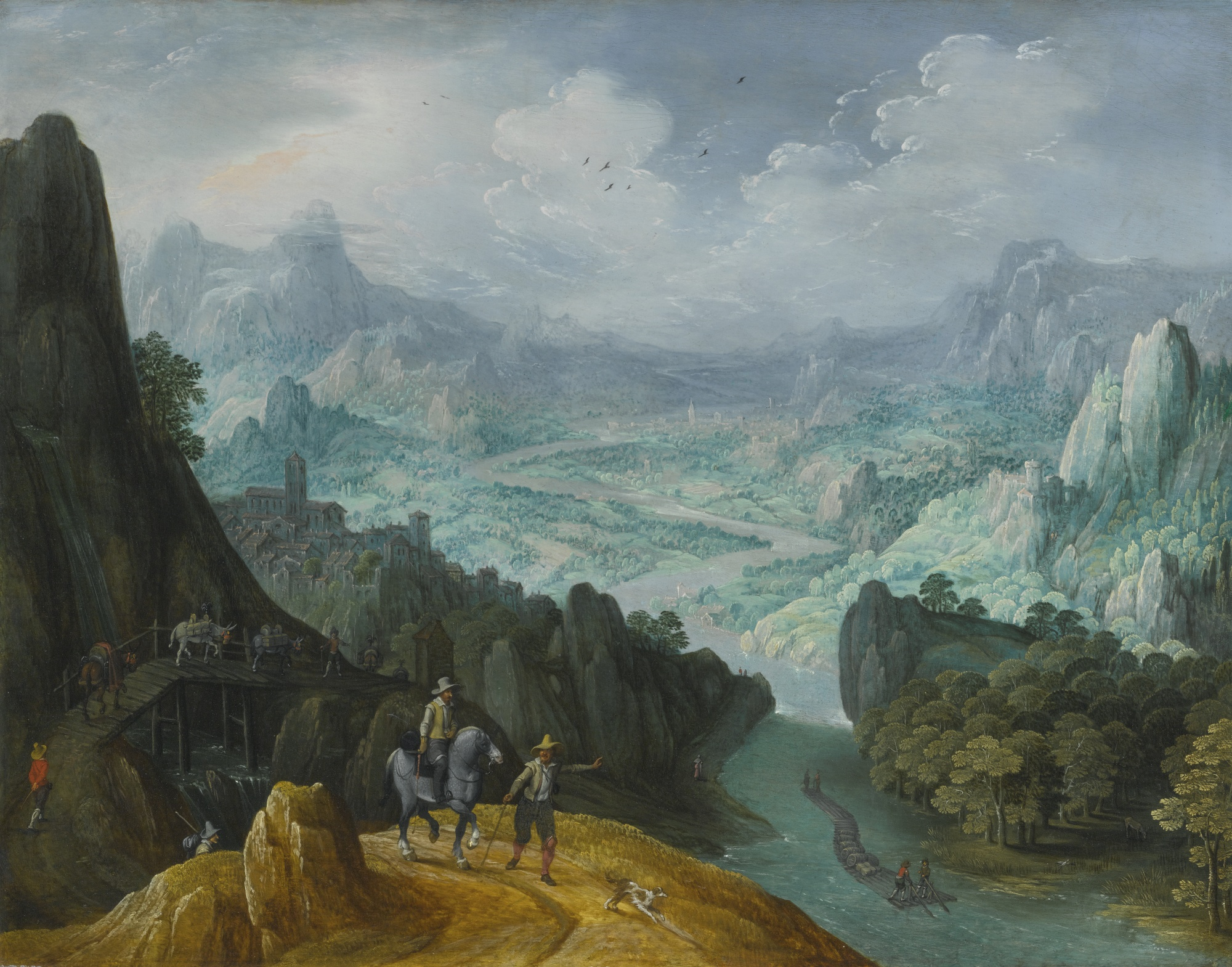
Mountainous River Landscape with Travelers

Tobias Verhaecht specialized in landscapes and also produced several versions of the Tower of Babel. His landscapes followed the traditional style of the world landscape, which had first been developed in the first half of the 16th century by Joachim Patinir and had reached its peak with Pieter Bruegel the Elder. The landscapes depict imaginary mountains characterized by rocky peaks seen from a high viewpoint and typically including a religious or mythological scene. These landscapes often include villages and figures dwarfed by their surroundings rendered in meticulous detail.

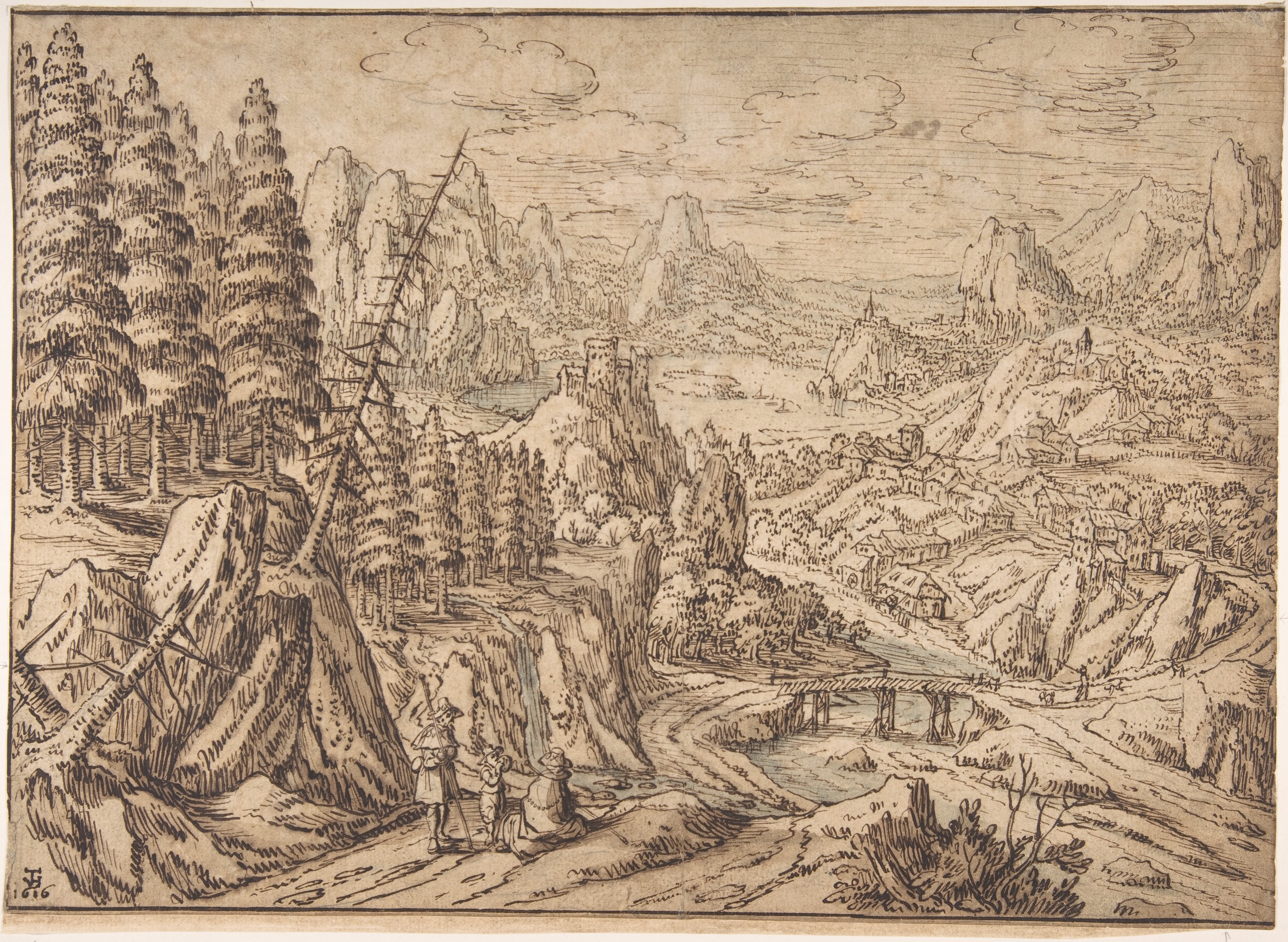
Mountainous landscape with travelers

His work closely resembles in style the set of 12 large prints published by Hieronymus Cock after designs by Pieter Bruegel the Elder, which are referred to by art historians as the Large Landscapes. The earliest works of Verhaecht are clearly conservative in style. The steep and bizarre rock formations and the strange atmosphere are indebted to Joachim Patinir, who was already dead for three-quarters of a century when Verhaecht started to create these works. Verhaecht shows in these works that the evolution of landscape painting during the second half of the sixteenth century had largely passed him by. In the 1620s and 1630s he painted panoramic landscapes with a high horizon and using the traditional three-color plan. He was thus still working in the fantastic landscape tradition at a time when Jan Brueghel the Elder was painting casual village landscapes, and his former pupil Rubens had realized some beautiful atmospheric landscapes. Verhaecht's landscapes were not entirely oblivious of the work of Josse de Momper and Gillis van Coninxloo who were evolving towards a more close-up and realist approach and he adopted some of the elements of the new approach.

He collaborated with other local painters such as Jan Brueghel the Elder, Frans Francken the Younger, Sebastian Vrancx and Gillis Coignet who painted the figures in his paintings. Some of Verhaecht's landscapes were made into prints.
