= Willem Backereel =

Flemish painter (1570–1626)

Guiliam or Willem Backereel (1570 in Antwerp – 10 August 1626 in Rome), was a Flemish Baroque landscape painter.

== Biography ==
According to Houbraken, who repeated the information from Joachim von Sandrart's Teutsche Academie, Willem Backereel was from a large painting family that always had a few brothers in Rome. Willem's brother Gillis Backereel lived with him in Rome, but returned to Antwerp, where he later died. Both brothers were known as landscape painters.

According to the RKD he was in Italy from 1605 onwards and was taught painting by his older brother Gillis. His Roman sketches of the Flavian Palace are similar to works by Cornelis van Poelenburch, Jan Asselijn and Jacob de Heusch.
