= Landscape with Venus and Adonis =

Painting by Tobias Verhaecht

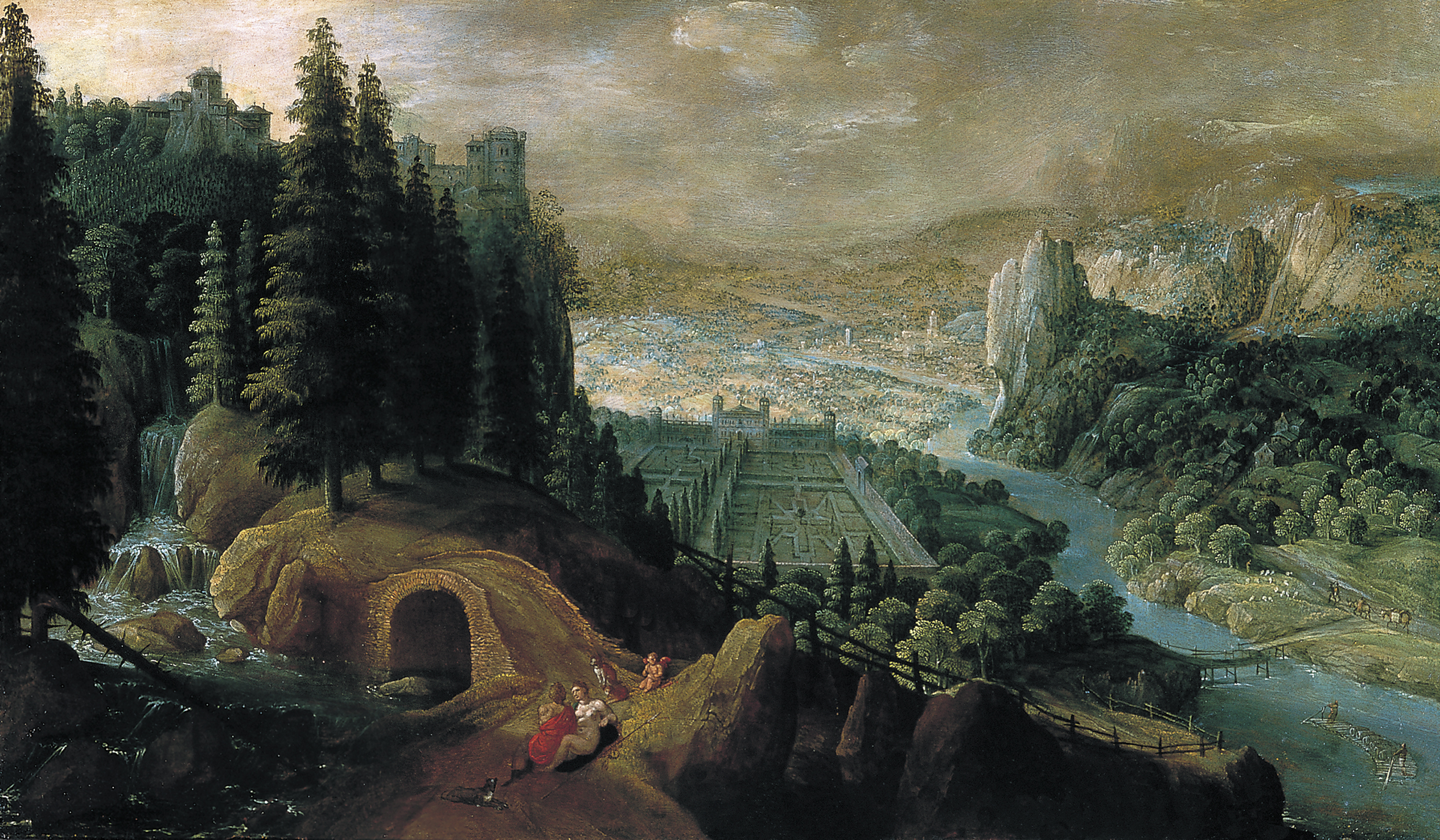
- Artist: Tobias Verhaecht
- Year: c. 1600
- Catalogue: CTB.1996.177
- Medium: Oil on canvas
- Dimensions: 40 cm × 68 cm (15.7 in × 26.7 in)
- Location: Thyssen-Bornemisza Museum, Madrid

Landscape with Venus and Adonis is an oil-on-canvas painting by Flemish painter Tobias Verhaecht. The work was probably painted in the 1600s, and is now in the Thyssen-Bornemisza Museum in Madrid.

== Painting ==
The view is from a vantage point. A river stretches down into a wide valley. To the left, two separate castles are visible behind the tall trees sitting on the wooded slope. In the foreground, on the roadside, there sit Venus and Adonis. A putto and Adonis' hunting dogs sit close by. From the foreground, a stony road unbends down into the dale. In the middle distance there stands a long palace's garden. High highlands are discernible in the misty background.

While Verhaecht reportedly visited Italy (living in Rome, where he reportedly was active as a painter of landscape frescos) his landscape paintings bear the mark of the Northern landscape tradition, and evince the influence of Brueghel and Patinir. Landscape with Venus and Adonis, like many other paintings by Verhaecht, depicts an imaginary, Weltlandschaft landscape characterized by mountainous topography. The Weltlandschaft tradition was popularized by Pieter Bruegel the Elder.

Verhaecht didn't paint his drawing or drew his studies while crossing the Alps in the context of his trip to Italy (possibly in the 1580s). Some of his mountain landscapes and drawings thereof are dated a late as 1620, long after his return to Flanders.

The custom of inserting biblical and mythological figures in the landscape paintings, practiced by Verhaecht contemporary landscapists such as Joos de Momper and Paul Bril, goes back to the first landscapists, which include Joachim Patinir and Herri met de Bles. These figures are but adornment to the real subject, the landscape, although they may give a painting its title and convey moral meanings, sometimes paralleled by items in the landscape.
