= Abraham Matthijs =

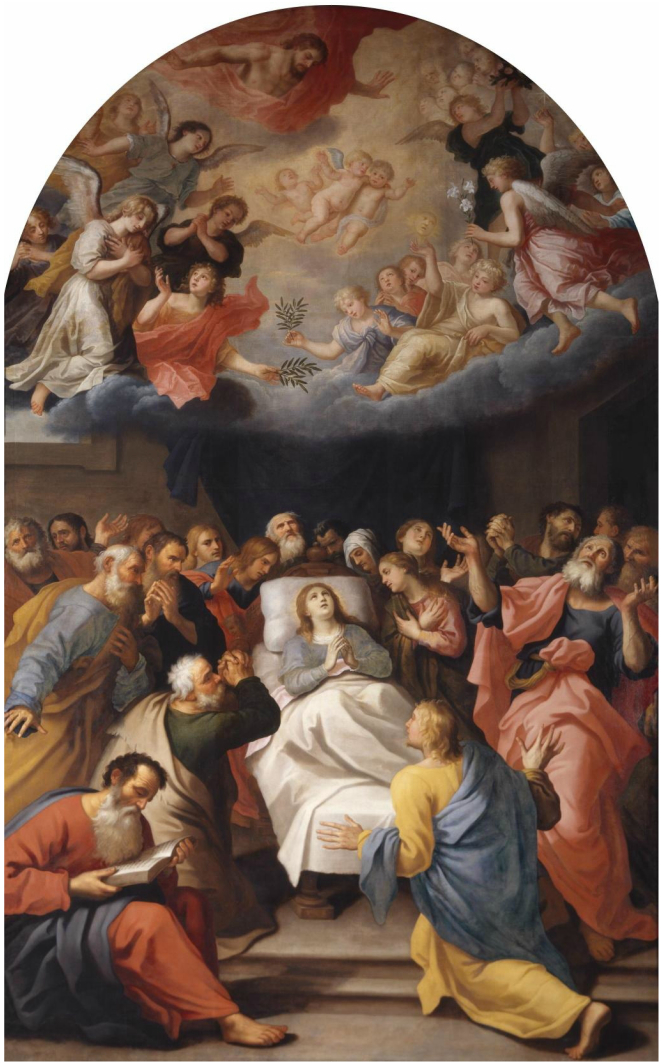
The death of Maria by Abraham Matthijs (1633), oil on canvas, 325x500cm

Abraham Matthijs or Abraham Matthys (1581 in Antwerp – 2 September 1649 in Antwerp) was a Flemish painter and art collector who was active in Antwerp and Italy. He is known for his religious compositions, marine scenes and portraits.

== Life ==
Abraham Matthijs was born in Antwerp as the son of the fishmonger Hendrik Matthijs and Margaretha van Roubergen. His parents were relatively well-off as they owned their own house on the Vismarkt. At the age of 10 Abraham he was registered at the Antwerp Guild of St. Luke as a pupil of Tobias Verhaecht, a landscape painter who had been the first teacher of Rubens. Abraham left Antwerp for Italy in 1603. Little is known about his residence or his work in Italy. He was back in Antwerp in 1619.

Abraham became a master in the Antwerp Guild of St. Luke in 1619 and had a pupil called Fransoeis Cosyn in that year. He left Antwerp not long after that and was absent from Antwerp from 1619 until the end of 1623. From 1633 to 1644 he received a pupil almost annually. He remained a bachelor his whole life and became a member of the Third Order Regular of St. Francis of Penance. He had an active role in the Sodaliteit der Jongmans van den Zoeten Naem Jesus, a fraternity for bachelors established in the Dominican church in Antwerp. In 1632 and 1637 Matthijs was the prefect of the Sodaliteit.

Matthijs was commercially successful and bought his own house. He became an avid art collector. His collection came to hold 340 paintings as well as numerous drawings and sculptures. The works included originals and copies of Italian masters, landscapes and a portrait of Paul Bril, two portraits of saints by Anthony van Dyck and two portraits and a self-portrait by Rubens painted during his youth, which is lost.

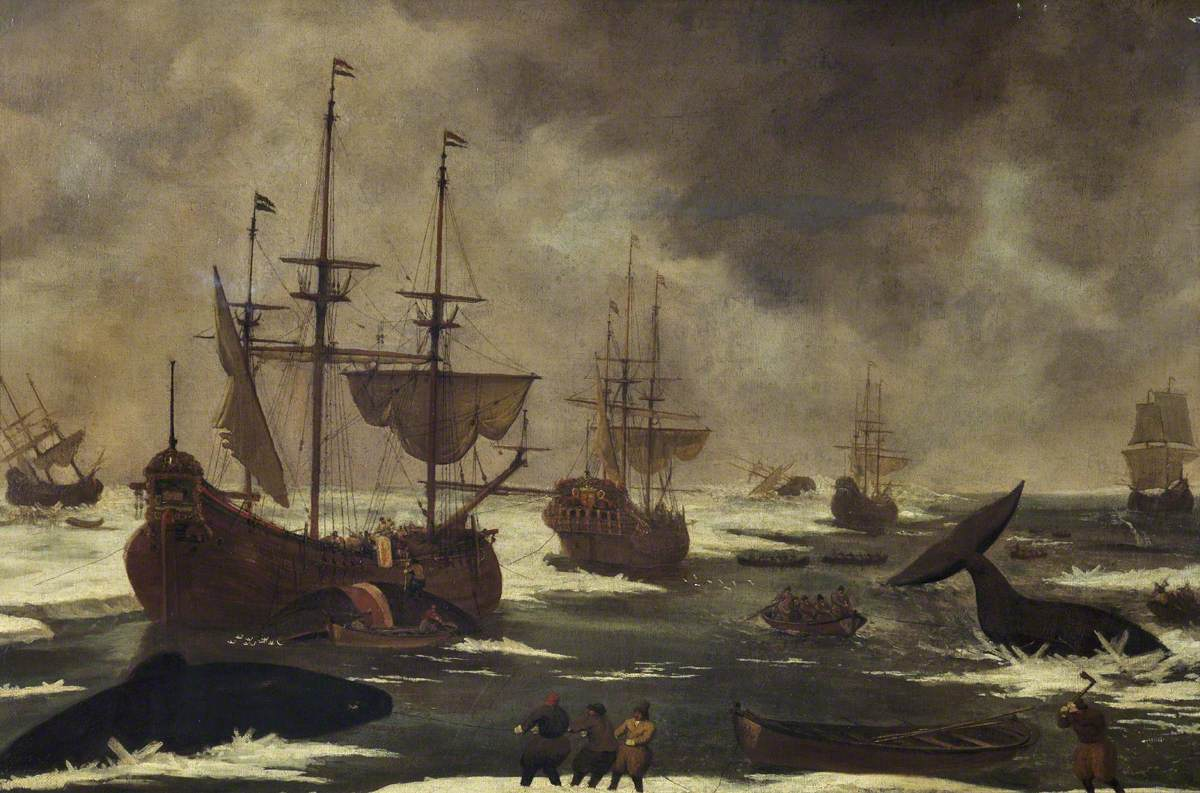
Whalers in the ice

Matthijs suffered from a weak constitution and on 17 and 19 September 1638 he was so ill that he drew up a will. He did not die then but more than 10 years later on 2 September 1649. He had before his death made arrangements to be buried in the habit of the Franciscans in the church of the Franciscans. He had also commenced a painting to be hung over his grave in the church which was unfinished at the time of his death.

== Work ==
Abraham Matthijs is known for religious paintings, portraits and marine scenes. Only very few of his works are preserved. One of them depicts The death of Maria (1633, Cathedral of Our Lady (Antwerp)). He also painted an Assumption of Mary for a local monastery.

He further painted a portrait of the marine painter Bonaventura Peeters the Elder, which hangs in the church of Our Lady in Hoboken, near Antwerp, where Peeters is buried.

Abraham Matthijs painted the Whalers in the ice (National Maritime Museum Greenwich, London). It shows a fleet of whaling ships at work with some of the whales floundering about while being hauled to the shore.
