= Alpine Landscape =

Painting by Paul Bril

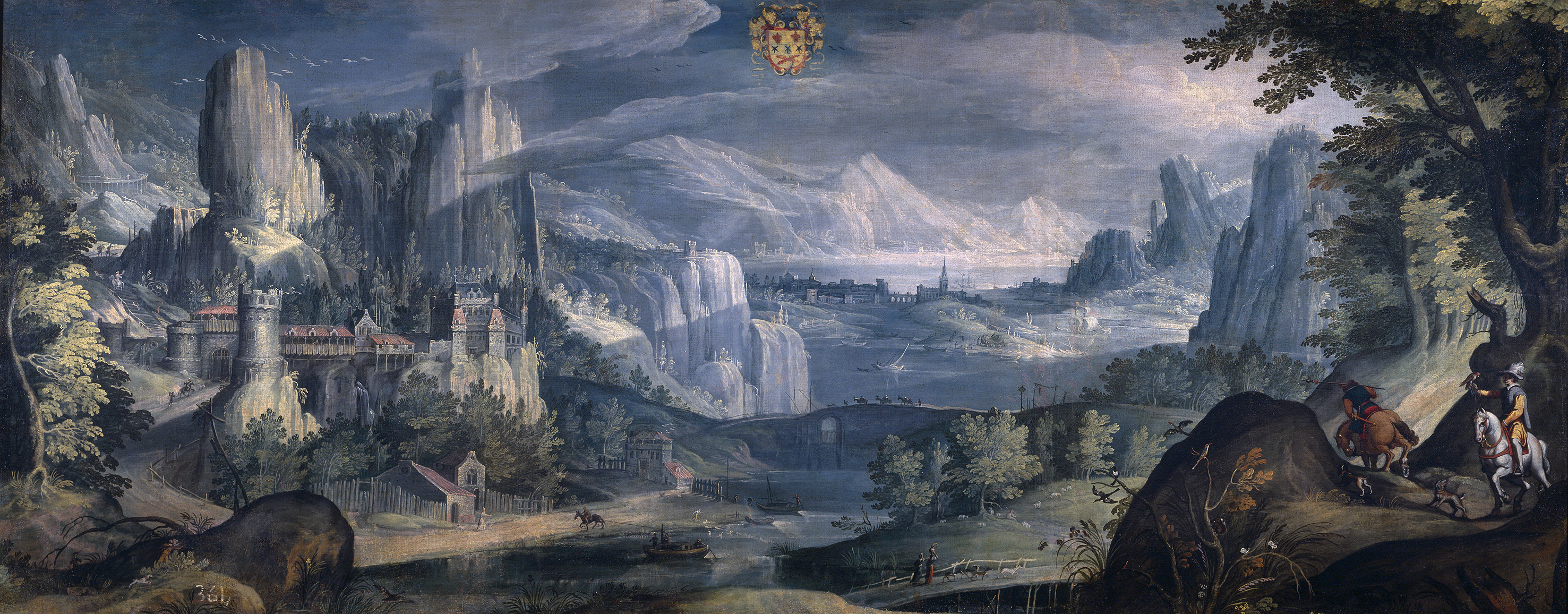
- Artist: Tobias Verhaecht
- Year: 1600 – 1615
- Catalogue: P003057
- Medium: Oil on canvas
- Dimensions: 106 cm × 267 cm (41.7 in × 105.1 in)
- Location: Museum of Prado; Madrid

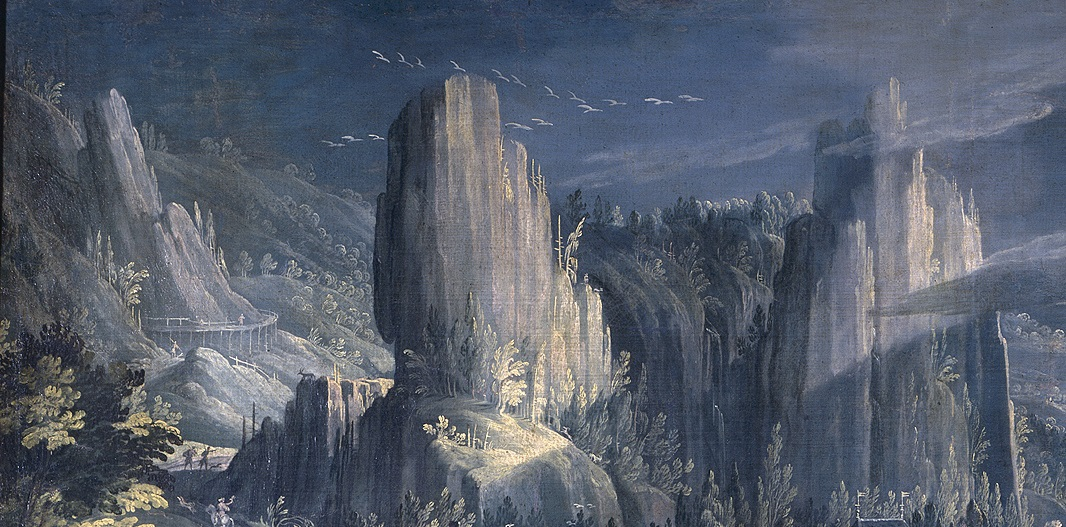
Detail crags above castle

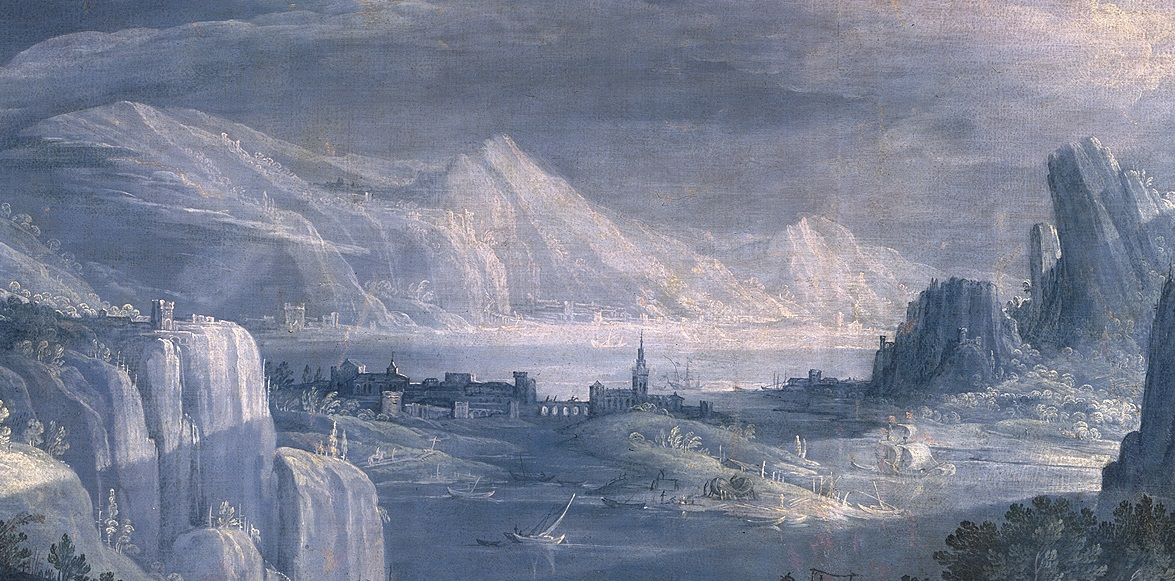
Detail bay and receding mountains

Alpine Landscape is an oil-on-canvas painting by Flemish painter Tobias Verhaecht. The painting was completed between 1600 and 1615, and is now in the Museum of Prado in Madrid.

== Painting ==
The painting was painted in Antwerp between 1600 and 1615, after Verhaecht's return from Italy. Verhaecht traveled to Italy in his youth. He was active in Florence and Rome, where he became a painter of landscape frescos. Verhaecht realized this painting in a relatively flat land such as Flanders. The painting is a product from the artist's imagination. Like several earlier Flemish artists such as Pieter Bruegel the Elder and Joachim Patinir, as well as many of Verhaect's contemporaries such as Joos de Momper and Paul Bril, Verhaecht favored imaginary, Weltlandschaft landscape painting over more realistic approaches. These imaginary and seemingly old-fashioned landscapes were painted thusly to satisfy the sophisticated tastes of the commissioners, and were paid more than the more realistic ones.

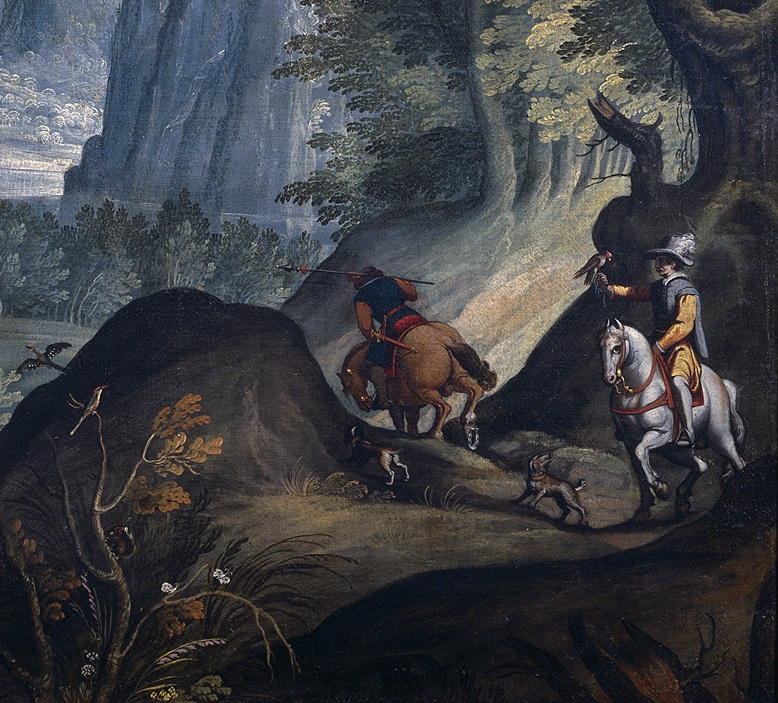
Detail hunters in the foreground

In the painting, an ample valley unfolds before the viewer's eye. The dale is delimited by high mountains that disappear from view behind high cliffs to the east. In the foreground, on the right, a hunter on a white horse is holding his falcon, while another rider on a brown horse charges down a mountain trail into the valley, holding his lance. The tortuous mountain trail leads to a castle perched on a cliff. Many figures are moving in the valley. They are busy with sundry activities such as hunting, fishing, and promenading. The painting was meticulously detailed by Verhaecht. In the foreground there are distinct flowers and birds. The painting maintains the compositional characteristics of the 16th-century landscape tradition. The space is structured in three color bands (yellow, green and blue) running parallel to the background. The horizon line is elevated. There is much attention to detail, with the different elements carefully portrayed. The admixture of elements of wild nature and elements that represent the intervention of man makes this landscape painting a "hybrid product of naturalistic landscape and imaginary landscape."

The overhanging coat of arms has not yet been identified.

== Provenance ==
The painting was acquired by the Museum as part of the Royal Collection. It was once housed at the Palacio del Buen Retiro in Madrid.

== Bibliography ==
- Thiéry, Yvonne, Le paysage flamand au XVII siècle. Des précurseurs à Rubens, Bruselas, 1953, pp. 61.
- Montesa, Marqués de, Heráldica en el Museo del Prado, Arte español, 25 (2), 1967, pp. 88.
- Salas, Xavier de, Museo del Prado. Catálogo de las pinturas, Museo del Prado, Madrid, 1972.
- Díaz Padrón, Matías, Museo del Prado: catálogo de pinturas. Escuela flamenca, Museo del Prado; Patrimonio Nacional de Museos, Madrid, 1975, pp. 427.
- Museo Nacional del Prado, Museo del Prado. Catálogo de las pinturas, Museo del Prado, Madrid, 1985, pp. 751.
- Díaz Padrón, Matías, El siglo de Rubens en el Museo del Prado: catálogo razonado, II, Prensa Ibérica, Barcelona, 1995, pp. 1520.
- Posada Kubissa, Teresa, El paisaje nórdico en el Prado. Rubens, Brueghel, Lorena, Museo Nacional del Prado, Madrid, 2011, pp. 31,33,156 n.1.
- Posada Kubissa, Teresa, Rubens, Brueghel, Lorrain. A Paisagem Nórdica do Museu do Prado, Museu Nacional de Arte Antiga - INCM - Museo Nacional del Prado, Lisboa, 2013, pp. 29,153 n.1.
