= Willem van Haecht =

Flemish painter (1593–1637)

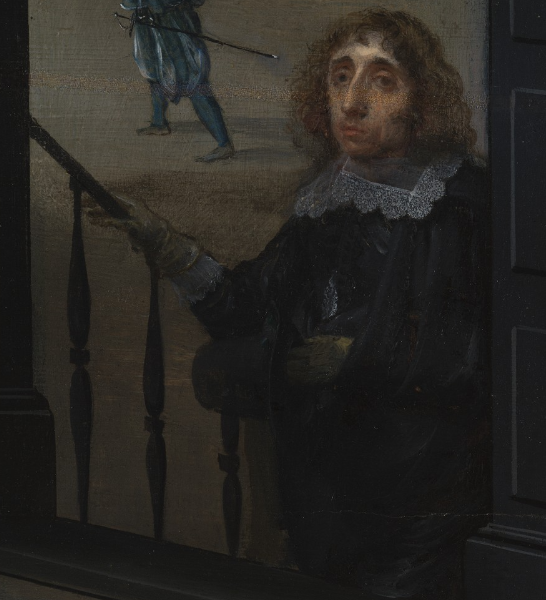
Self-portrait from The Gallery of Cornelis van der Geest

Willem van Haecht (1593 – 12 July 1637) was a Flemish painter best known for his pictures of art galleries and collections.

== Life ==
Willem van Haecht was born in Antwerp as the son of the landscape painter Tobias Verhaecht. Tobias Verhaecht was a prominent painter who had been the first teacher of Peter Paul Rubens. Willem was a pupil of his father.

He worked in Paris from 1615 to 1619, and then travelled to Italy for about seven years. Van Haecht became a master in Antwerp's guild of St. Luke in 1626 and from 1628 onwards was the curator of the art collection owned by Cornelis van der Geest.

This collection is represented in allegorical terms in the Gallery of Cornelis van der Geest (1628; Rubenshuis, Antwerp). The left side of the painting includes various portraits of contemporaneous figures, including (from the left) Infanta Isabel Clara of Spain, Archduke Albert of Austria, Peter Paul Rubens, Prince Władysław Vasa of Poland (who visited van der Geest's Gallery in 1624, with black hat) and the host showing a picture, as well as many famous paintings such as Paracelsus by Quentin Matsys.

Alexander the Great Visiting the Studio of Apelles (c. 1630, Mauritshuis) is another gallery painting by van Haecht. It has significant documentary evidence as it is believed it is an idealised image of elements drawn from Rubens' collection.

== Gallery ==
Willem van Haecht's paintings of art galleries

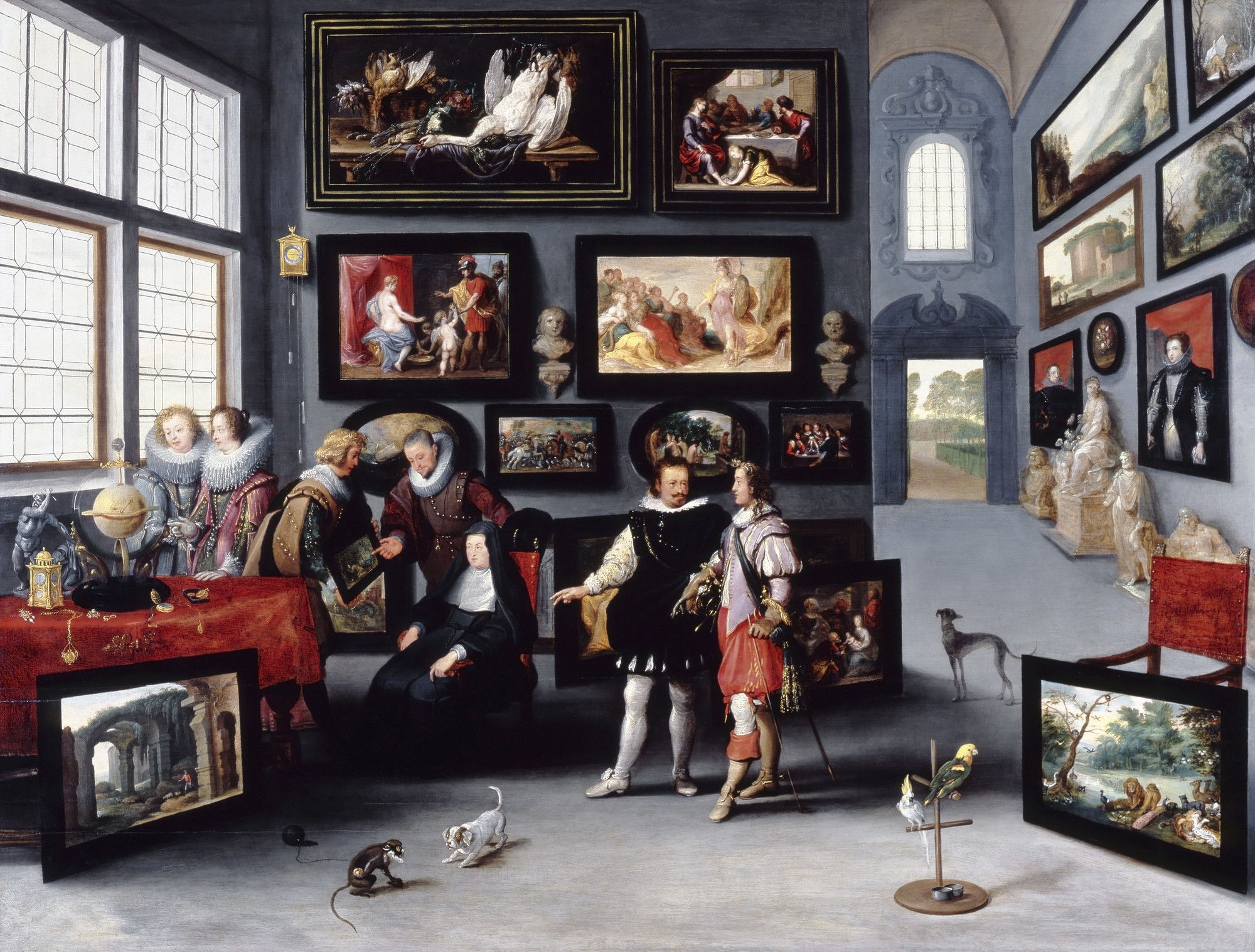
Interior of the Salon of the Archduchess Isabella of Austria; 1621, oil on panel, 93 × 123 cm, Norton Museum of Art.

The Gallery of Cornelis van der Geest; 1628, oil on panel, 99 × 129 cm, Rubenshuis.

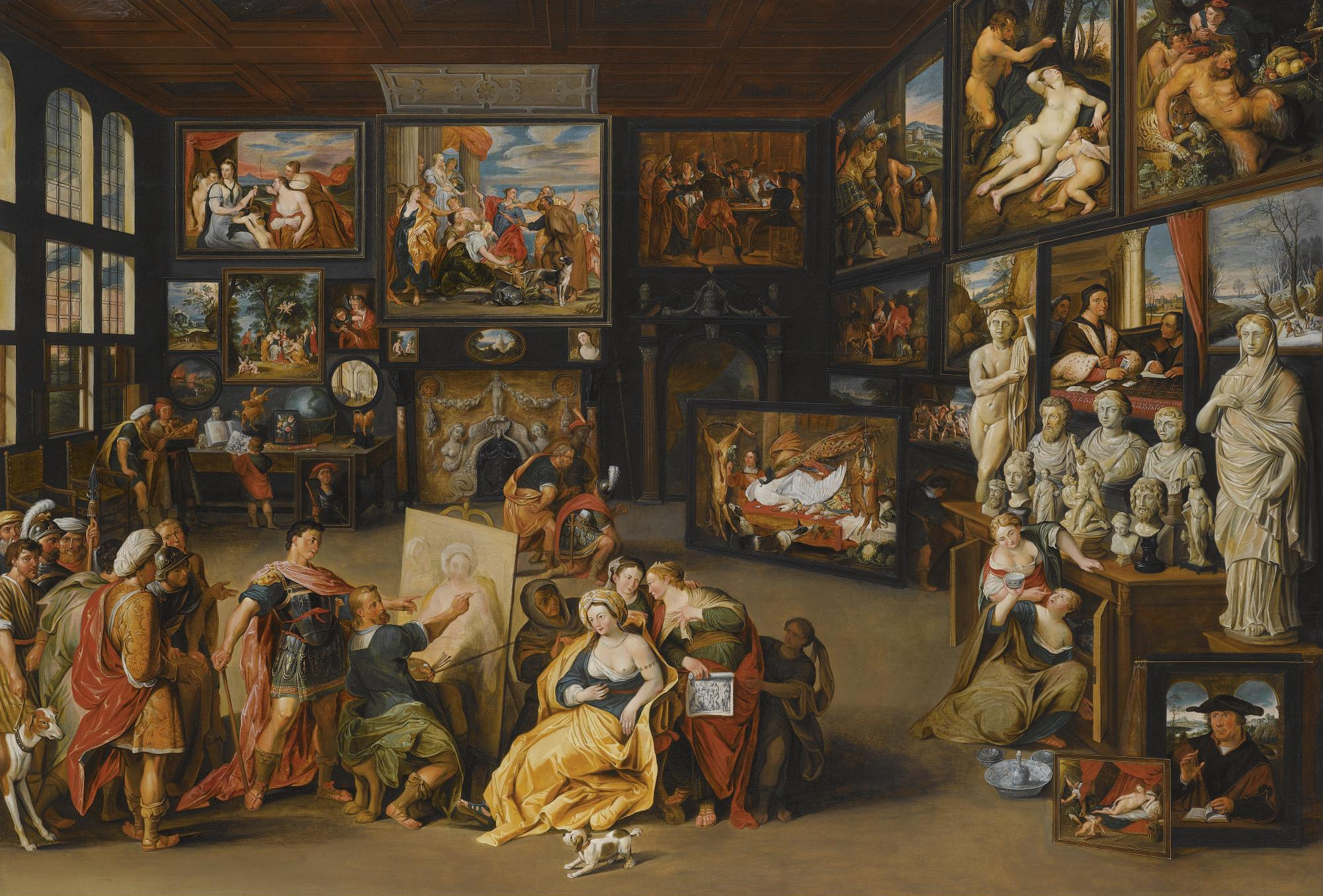
Alexander the Great visits the studio of Apelles; 1628–37, oil on panel, 78 × 114 cm, private collection.

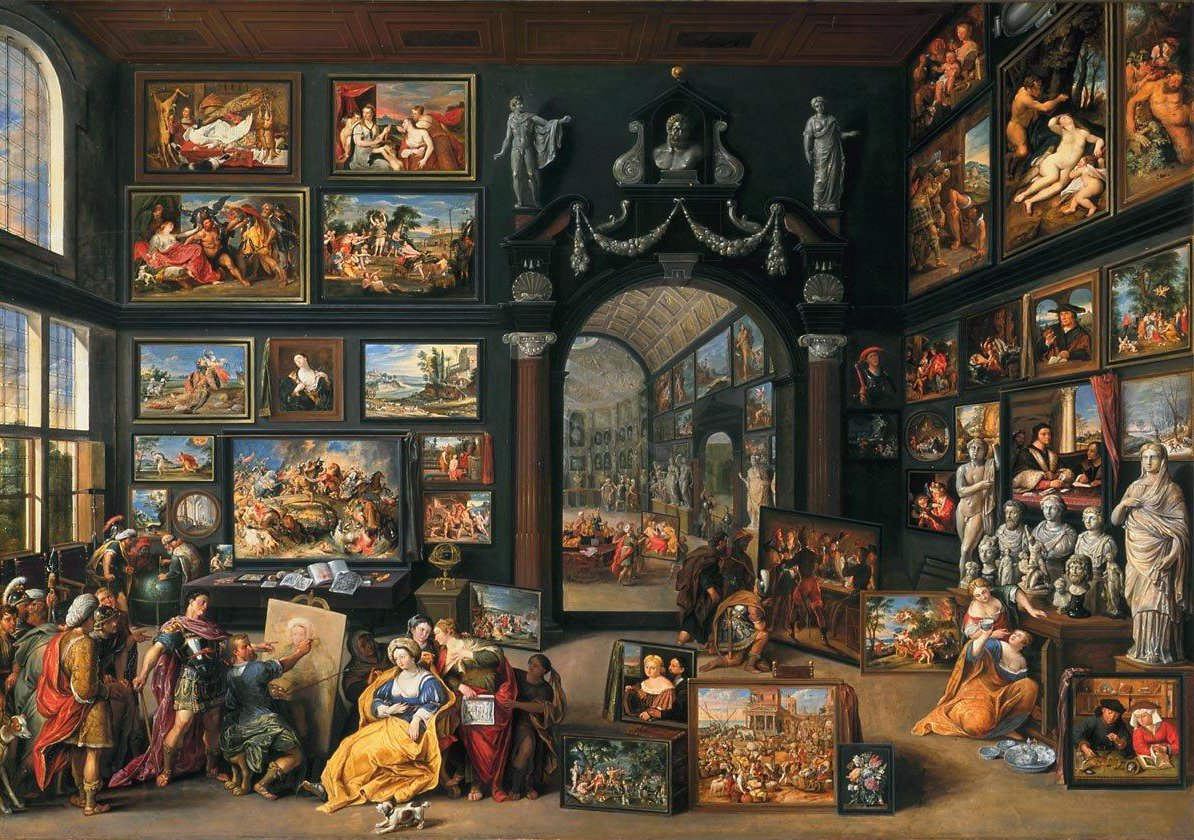
Apelles painting Campaspe; c. 1630, oil on panel, 105 × 149 cm, Mauritshuis.

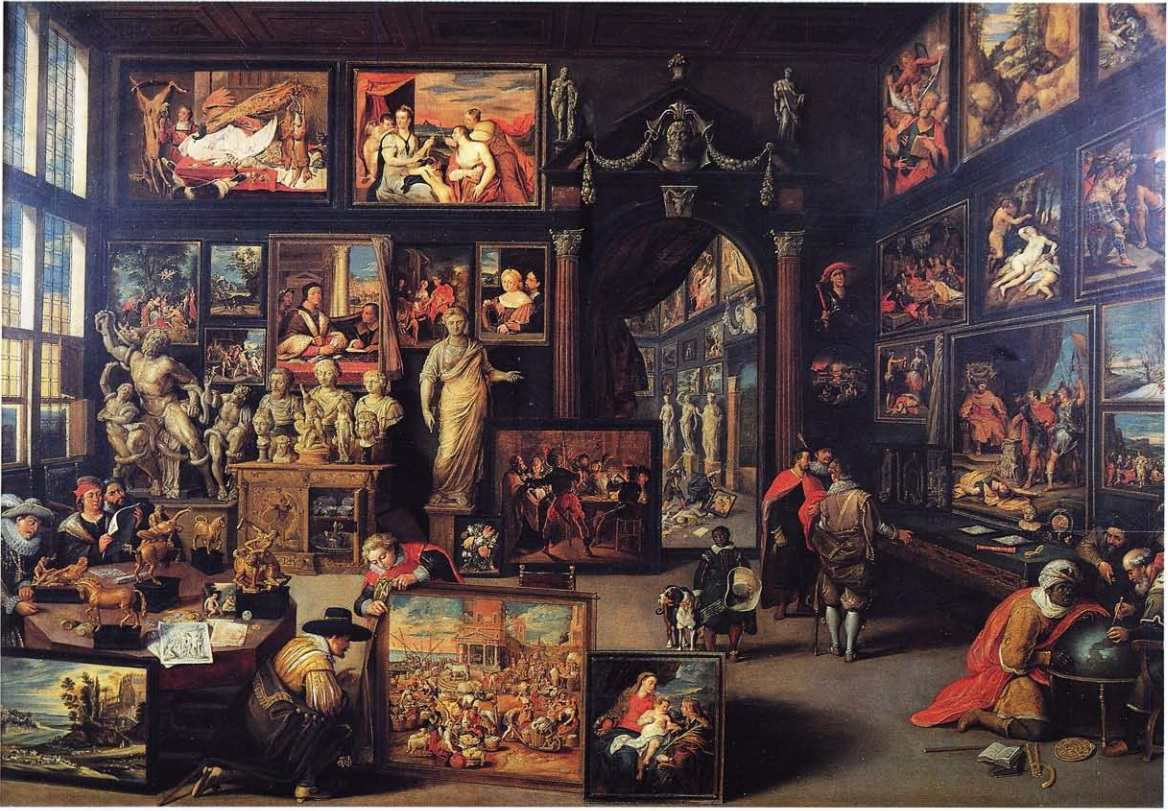
Collection of Cornelis de Geest with Paracelsus; 1630s, oil on panel, 73 × 104 cm, The Bute collection.

== Sources ==
- Christine van Mulders. "Haecht, Willem van, II," Grove Art Online. Oxford University Press, [7 November 2007].
- Vlieghe, Hans (1998). Flemish Art and Architecture, 1585–1700. Pelican history of art. New Haven: Yale University Press. ISBN 0-300-07038-1
- Alexander Marr, "Ingenuity and Discernment in The Cabinet of Cornelis van der Geest (1628)", Nederlands Kunsthistorisch Jaarboek, vol. 69 (2020), 106–145
