= Jacques Backereel =

Flemish Baroque landscape painter

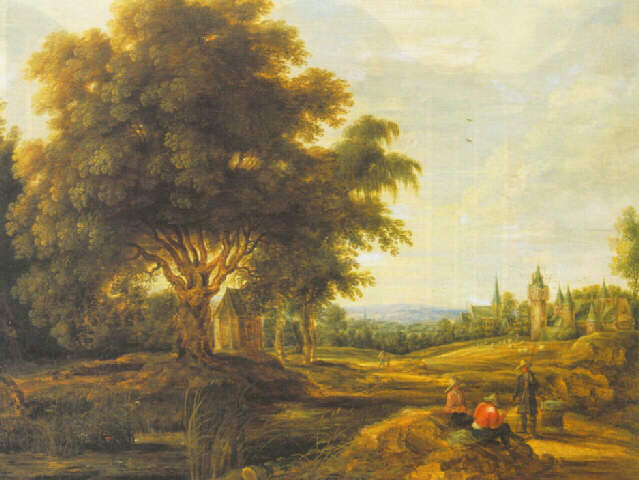
Landscape with figures

Jacques Backereel (Antwerp, c. 1590 – Antwerp, after 1658), was a Flemish Baroque landscape painter. After training in Antwerp he worked for some time in Rome. He is mainly known for large-scale landscape paintings.

== Life ==
Little is known about the early life of Backereel. He is believed to have been born in Antwerp. The date of his birth is placed between roughly 1580 and 1602. Most likely he was born in the late 1590s as he started his apprenticeship in 1612. His teacher was Tobias Verhaecht, a landscape painter who had been the first teacher of Rubens Jacques became a master in the Antwerp Guild of St. Luke in 1618. Jacques Backereel is documented in Rome in the period from 1626 to 1638.

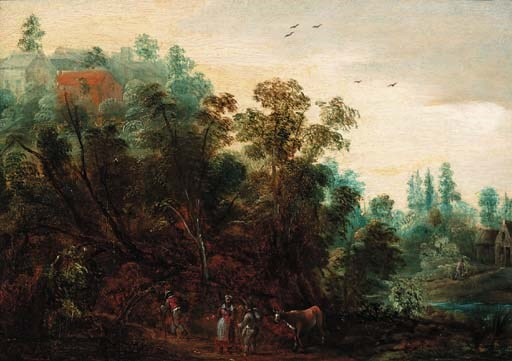
Wooded landscape with travellers on a path

Jacques Backereel was the teacher of Hendrick Backereel (1645), the landscape painter Abraham Genoels, Jan Baptist Huybrecht (1658) and the engraver Franciscus van der Steen II (1658).

The artist is believed to have died in Antwerp between 1658 and 1678.

== Work ==
Jacques Backereel was a landscape painter. Very few works have been attributed to him with certainty. Numerous landscapes by a Backereel were mentioned in Antwerp inventories from 1649 onwards and later in the papers of the Forchondt art dealers of Antwerp. It is believed that they were painted by Jacques Backereel. A number of these are specified as large paintings.
