= Édouard Jonas =

French politician (1883–1961)

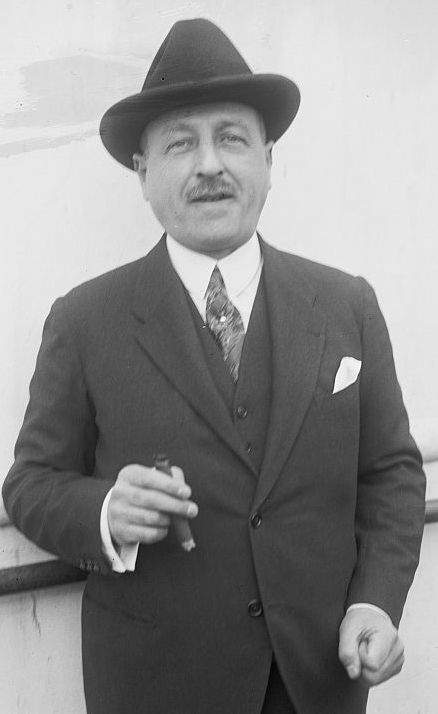
- Born: 9 May 1883; Paris, France
- Died: 3 December 1961 (aged 78); Paris, France

Édouard Jonas (9 May 1883 – 3 December 1961) was an antique dealer of Jewish origin, who became a member of the French parliament. When France surrendered to the Germans in 1940 he left the country. He was stripped of his citizenship and his property seized. After the war he was made a member of the Legion of Honor. In 2011 it was agreed to return two of the seized paintings to his heirs.

== Early career ==
Édouard Jonas was born in Paris on 9 May 1883, son of an antique dealer. He followed his father in this profession. He was of Jewish origin. Jonas specialized in 18th century works. Until mid-1932 he owned a large antique shop in New York, but it was closed due to lack of sales in the depression. He kept open his gallery at Place Vendome & Rue Castiglione in Paris, a fashionable location. His wife had been married to David Schulte, owner of a chain of cigar stores. He became curator of the Musée Cognacq-Jay while acting as a consultant to the customs department and a foreign trade adviser.

Between 1924 and 1932 Jonas was one of the supporters of Jean Ossola, a member of parliament. In the April–May 1936 national election, Édouard Jonas won a seat in parliament representing Grasse, Alpes-Maritimes, on the Socialist and Republican Union platform. He was elected on the second round. He was a member of the committee on education and fine arts, and then president of the committee on public works. Jonas was a target of anti-Semitic attacks in France before World War II (1939-1945). Thus on 7 January 1939 Le Progrès provençal ran a hostile article titled "Jonasseries" that referred to his "Ashkenazi" Jewish origins.

== World War II ==
Portrait of a Man with a Dog by anonymous German artist: one of the looted paintings acquired by Hermann Göring

When the Nazis invaded France in 1940, Jonas managed to ship the contents of his antique store from Paris to Bordeaux for safe keeping. At Vichy, Jonas did not take part in the 10 July 1940 vote on the draft constitutional law delegating powers to Marshal Philippe Pétain. On 27 July 1940, Le Progrès provençal published a violent attack on Jonas, who had fled. Jonas expressed hostility to the Vichy regime, and as a result on 6 September 1940 he was stripped of his French nationality by decree. On 27 September 1940 his property in Grasse and Antibes was sequestered. On 27 December 1940 another decree removed him from office. The Direction des musées sequestered art work from his collection, and those of other Jews.

In November 1940 Jonas was in Canada. In an interview, he said that the French government had been wrong to capitulate to the Germans, and should have escaped to North Africa. A supporter of General Charles de Gaulle, he said that the French people supported the British in their struggle against Adolf Hitler, but their leadership was lacking. Jonas was in the United States in September 1942, when he signed a letter sent to General Charles de Gaulle by five members of the French parliament. The other signatories were Henri de Kérillis, Hervé de Lyrot, Pierre Mendès France and Pierre Cot.

== Later years ==
After the war, Jonas was made a Knight of the Legion of Honor. He died in Paris on 3 December 1961 at the age of 78.

Two of Jonas's paintings were seized in Bordeaux in 1940 in the name of Hermann Göring. In 1944 Göring gave them to Alois Miedl, an art dealer, in exchange for a Vermeer painting (which turned out to be a Han van Meegeren forgery). After the war, the Netherlands Art Property collection ended up in possession of the paintings. In December 2011 a committee recommended returning the works to Jonas's heirs. The two paintings were Anonymous Portrait of a Man with a Dog and Théobald Michau's Landscape with cattle in a shallow river.

The Germans were not the only ones to seize Jewish property. In October 1940 four crates containing artwork that had been taken from France were seized in Bermuda and sent to the National Gallery of Canada. In 1949 the crates were opened and the contents divided between Martin Fabiani and Edouard Jonas, who was acting for the sisters Jeanne and Léontine Vollard. Jonas noticed that a small watercolor by Paul Cézanne was missing. Jonas and then his widow, Assunta Jonas, made numerous inquiries but were refused information by the National Gallery. It was only in April 2013 that the gallery acknowledged that it had possession of the watercolor.
