= Pieter van der Borcht =

Pieter van der Borcht may refer to one of the following 16th and 17th century Flemish artists:

- Pieter van der Borcht the Elder (c. 1530–1608), a Flemish Renaissance painter, draughtsman and etcher
- Pieter van der Borcht (III) (c. 1589–1662), a Flemish painter and draftsman
