= Pieter van Avont =

Flemish painter

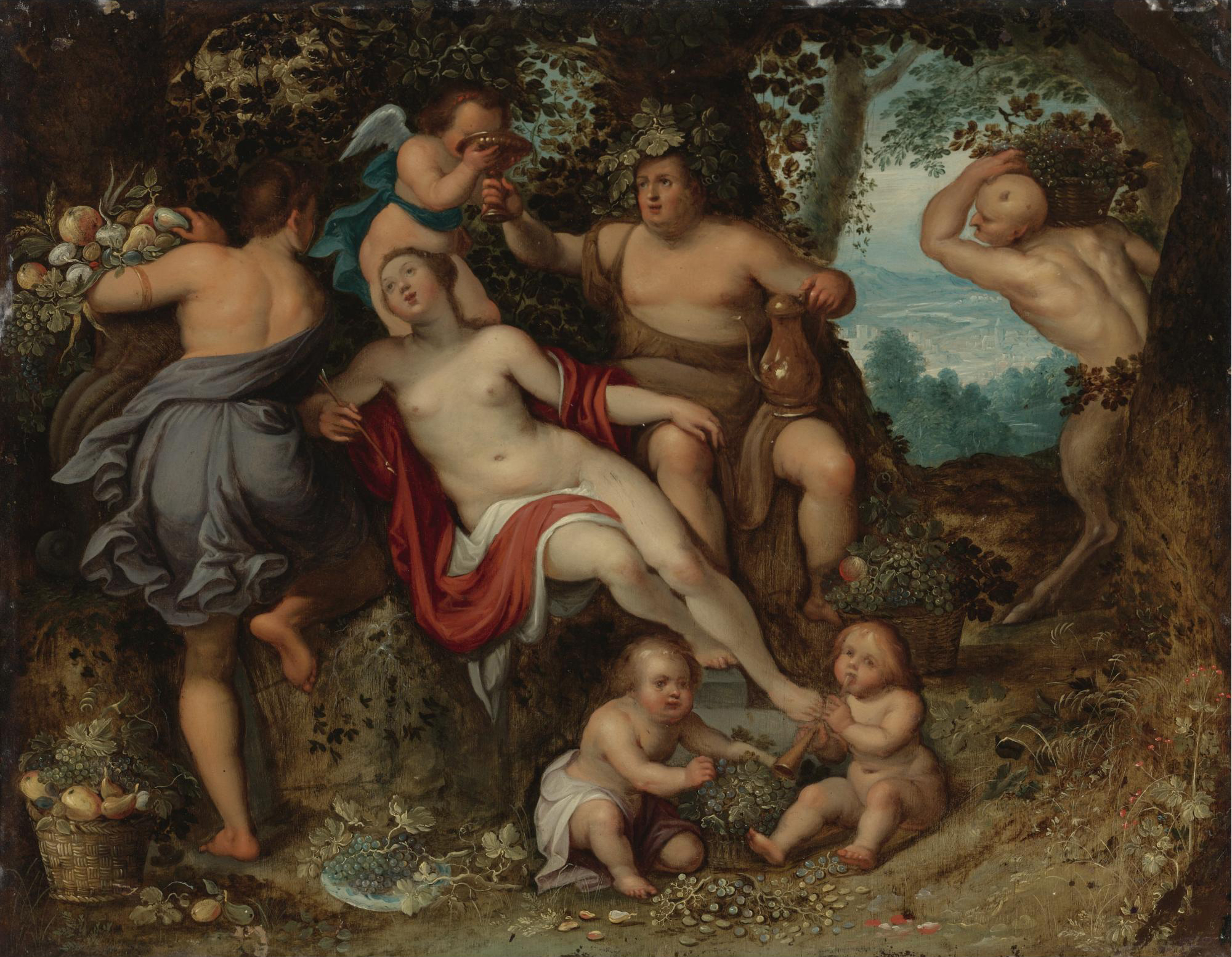
Sine Cerere et Baccho friget Venus

Pieter van Avont or Peter van Avont, (1600–1652) was a Flemish painter, draughtsman and printmaker known for his religious scenes and cabinet paintings often including nude children and putti. Van Avont was a frequent collaborator with many leading painters in Antwerp.

== Life ==
Pieter van Avont was baptized on 14 January 1600 in Mechelen His parents were the sculptor Hans van Avont and Anna le Febure.

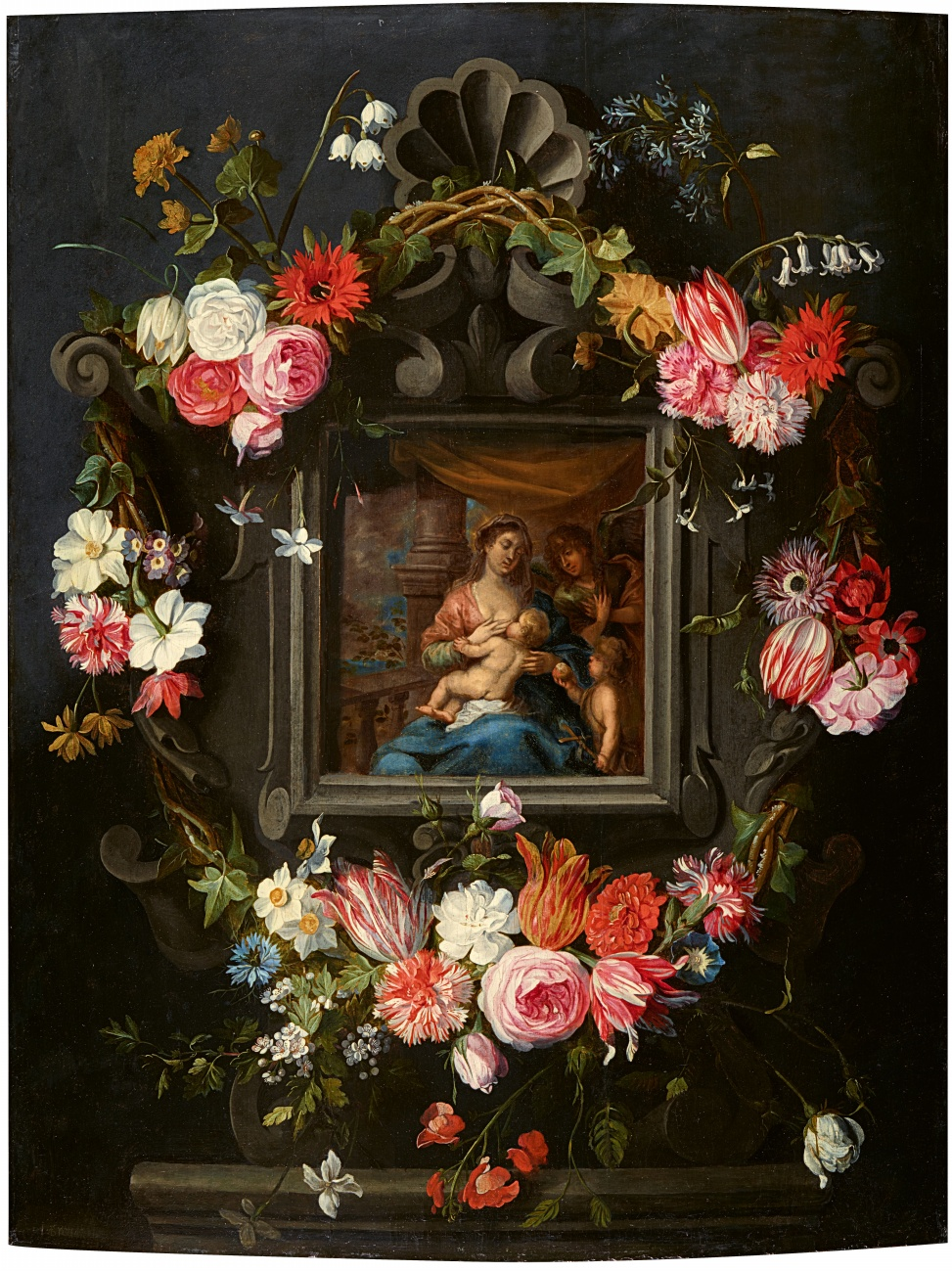
The Virgin and Child in a Cartouche with Flowers, with Jan Brueghel the Younger

It is not known with which master he studied but it is believed he received his first training from his father. He was accepted as a master of the guild of Mechelen in 1620. He moved to Antwerp two years later. Around 1622/3, he was accepted as master of the Guild of Saint Luke in Antwerp and he became a citizen of that city in 1631.

On 2 August 1622 he married Catherine van Hertsen in Antwerp cathedral, although they lived in the parish of St. James Church.

Pieter van Avont likely received commissions from Archduke Leopold William, Governor of the Southern Netherlands, as the Archduke is known to have owned a landscape with the Virgin and Child with Angels by van Avont. Even so, Pieter van Avont was not able to live off his art and operated a side business as a dealer in paintings and prints. He was appointed captain of the local schutterij (civil militia) in 1633 but he resigned from the position in 1639 giving as the reason the need for him to paint in order to sustain his family. His first wife died on 3 September 1643. On 7 February 1644 van Avont married a second time. His second wife was Catharina 't Kint and they had five children.

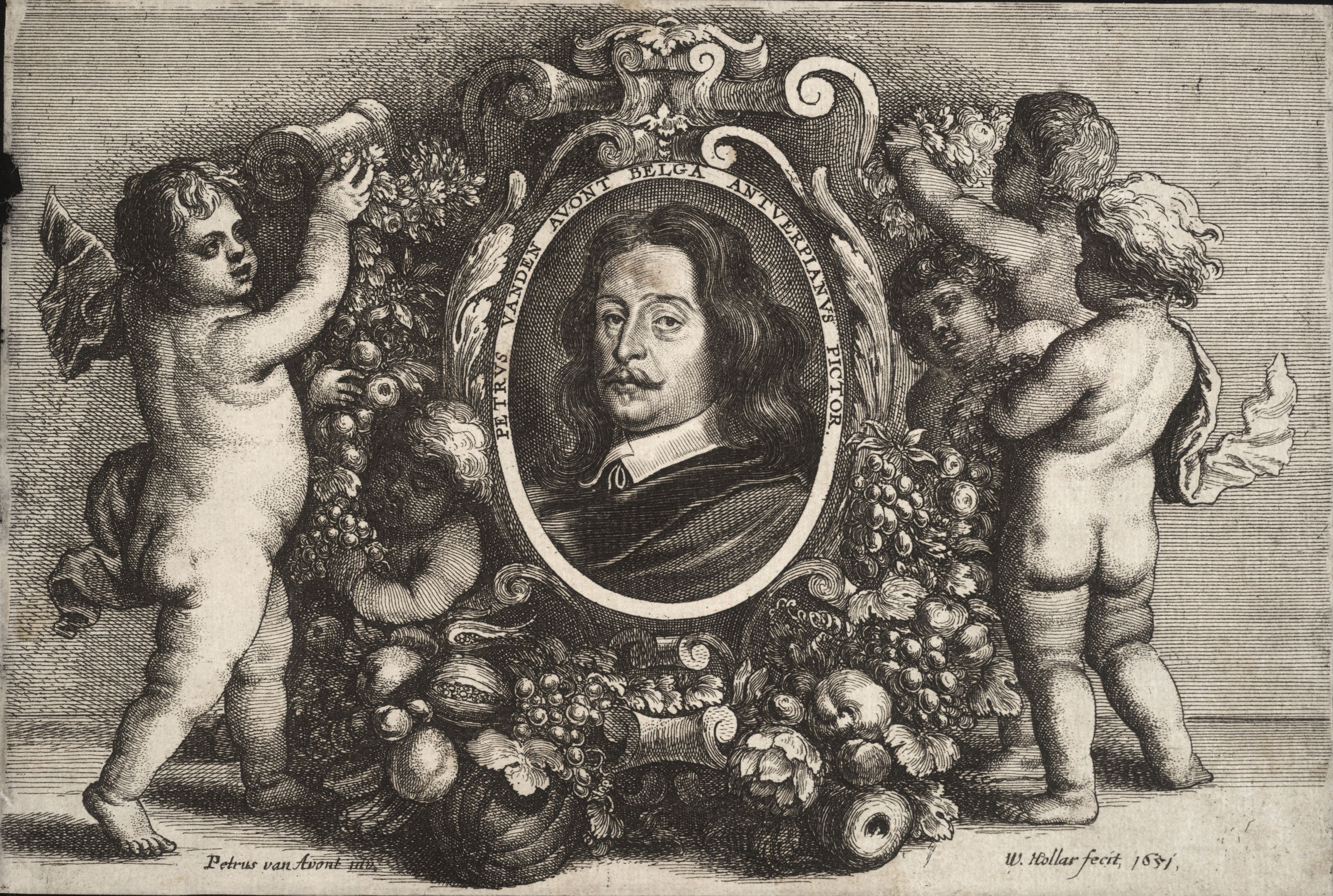
Pieter van Avont by Wenceslaus Hollar

From the baptisms of his children and of his friends' children it is possible to get an idea of the circle of artistic friends of van Avont. The godfathers and godmothers to his children included the painters Melchior Teniers and Frans Wouters. Catharina 't Kint was the godmother of Marie-Anne Hollar, the daughter of the printmaker Wenceslas Hollar en Margaretha Straci. Wenceslas Hollar is known to have made a portrait of his friend van Avont.

His financial position deteriorated after his second marriage and he had to sell the seven houses he owned and mortgage his residence. His children were sickly and seven of them died before the artist. He spent a lot of money on medical bills. He moved to rural Deurne near Antwerp in order to provide for a healthier environment for his children. He died in 1652 soon after moving his family there and was buried on 1 November 1652.

Peeter van den Cruys was a pupil of van Avont in 1625-'26. Frans Wouters was apprenticed to Pieter van Avont in 1629 but Wouters broke his contract to move to the workshop of Rubens in 1634. Frans Wouters' brother Pieter was van Avont's pupil in 1631–32.

== Work ==
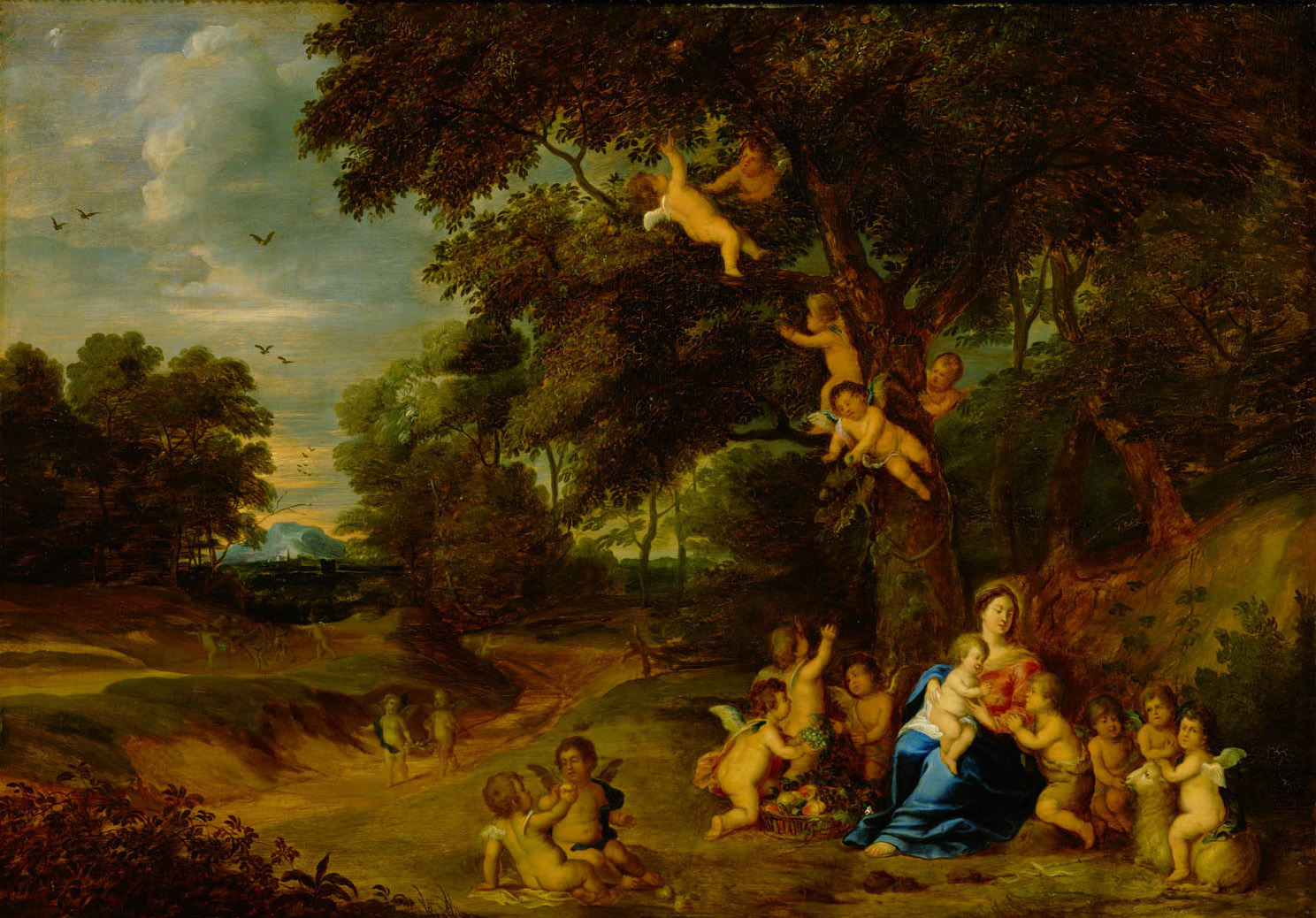
Madonna and Child, St John the Baptist as a Boy and Angels in a Woodland Landscape

Pieter van Avont is mainly known for his religious and mythological scenes and cabinet paintings. A motif appearing in many of van Avont's works is a group of naked children and putti. In his many renderings of the Holy Family, they appear in a variety of roles such as the Infant Christ, John the Baptist and angels. They often pay tribute to the Virgin and Child. The arrangement of the figures in the grouping is identical in several of his paintings. Figures of naked children also appear in his bacchanals and in allegorical scenes such as the Four Elements and War and Peace. His style in these works is characterized by a soft modelling of the figures using sfumato and warm colours. The scenes with children are often set in a landscape. Although van Avont signed several of these compositions, he did not always paint the landscapes himself.

As was common in Antwerp artistic practice in the 17th century, van Avont collaborated with many leading painters in Antwerp including Jan Brueghel the Elder and Younger, David Vinckboons, Lucas van Uden, Jacques d'Arthois, Lucas Achtschellinck, Lodewijk de Vadder, Izaak van Oosten and Jan Wildens.

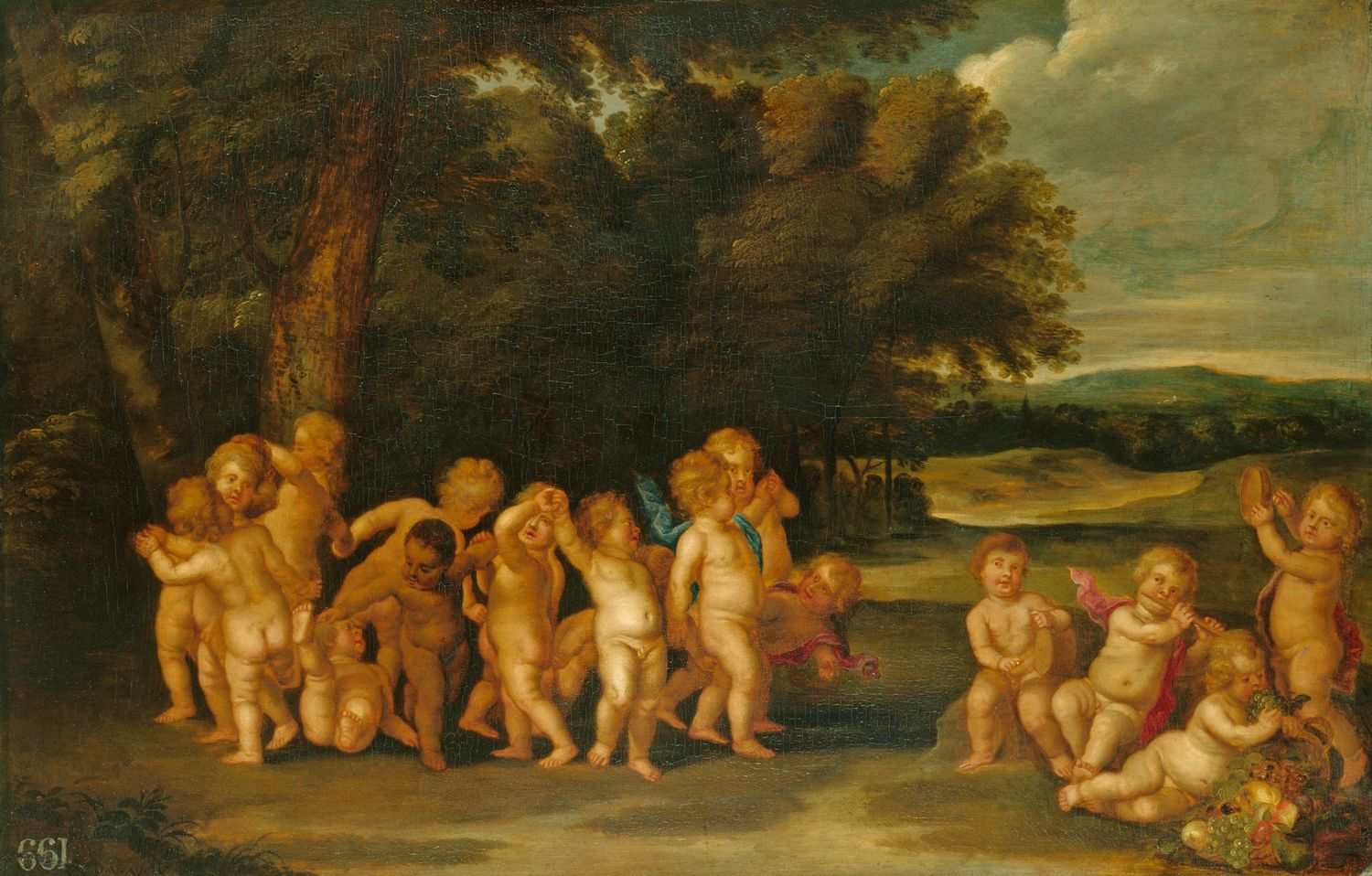
Putti Dancing in a Landscape

He collaborated with Jan Brueghel the Elder on a garland painting. Garland paintings typically show a flower or fruit garland around a devotional image or portrait. Jan Brueghel the Elder played a key role in the invention and development of the genre of garland paintings. The genre of garland paintings was inspired by the cult of veneration and devotion to Mary prevalent at the Habsburg court (then the rulers over the Southern Netherlands) and in Antwerp generally. The genre was initially connected to the visual imagery of the Counter-Reformation movement. Garland paintings were usually collaborations between a still life and a figure painter. Jan Brueghel the Younger and Pieter van Avont painted together The Virgin and Child in a Cartouche with Flowers. Pieter van Avont painted the figures.

He painted landscapes himself. Evidence for this is that a pair of landscapes by van Avont was listed in an Antwerp estate in 1676. While the work Flora in a Garden with Flowers and Trees (Kunsthistorisches Museum) was referred to in the 19th century as co-signed by van Avont and Jan Brueghel the Younger, it is now believed that van Avont also painted the landscape which had been attributed to Brueghel.

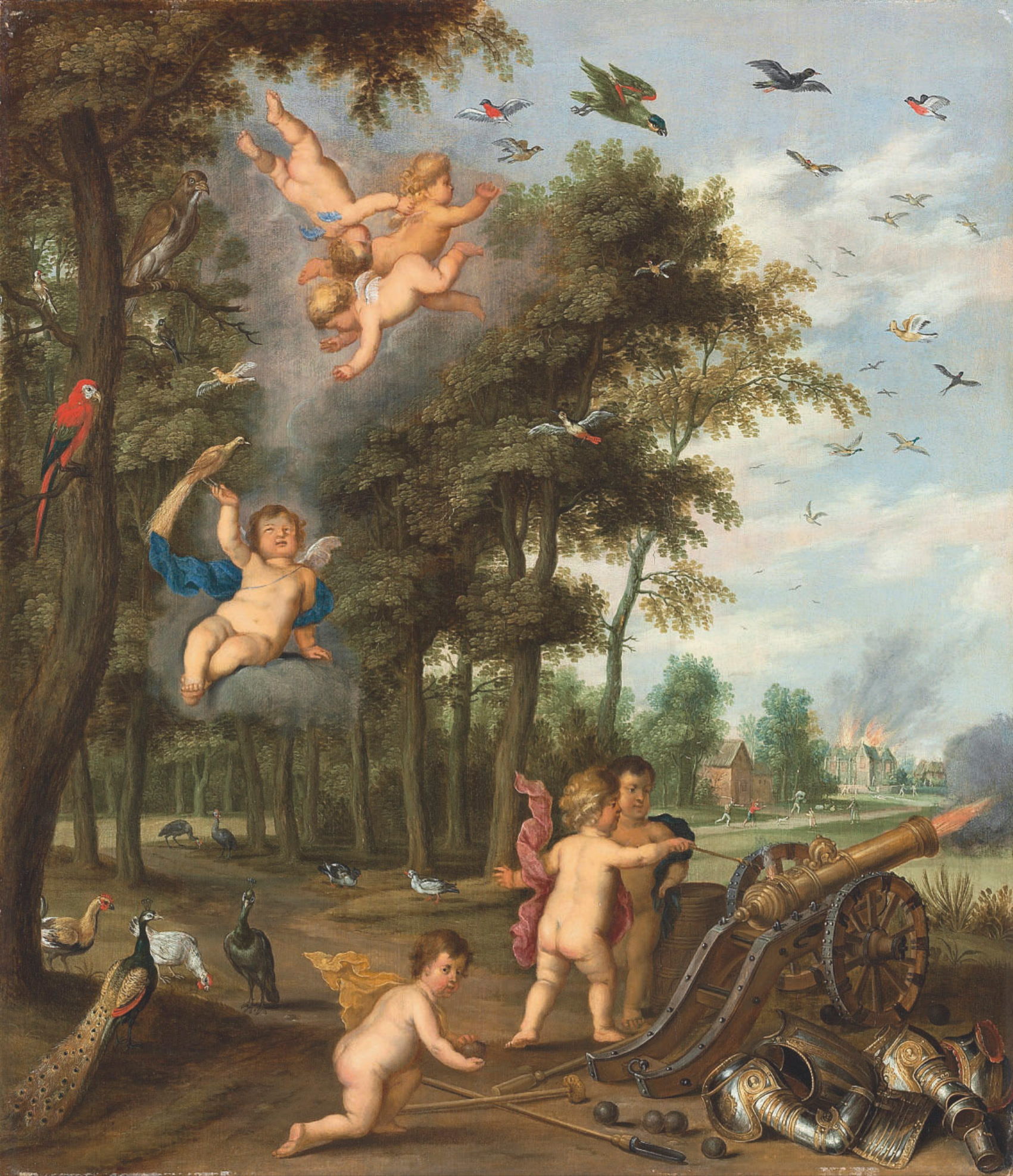
An Allegory of Air and Fire

Van Avont was also a printmaker and etched several plates with scenes of angels and putti.

== Selected works ==
- Flora in a Garden with Flowers and Trees, with Jan Brueghel the Elder, oil on copper, 70 × 47 cm, Kunsthistorisches Museum, Gemäldegalerie, Vienna, Austria
- Holy Family in a Flower and Fruit Garland with Jan Brueghel the Elder, c. 1623, oil on panel, 93,5 × 72 cm, Alte Pinakothek, Munich, Germany
- Deposition from the Cross after Rubens 1641, Sint-Gertrudiskerk Vorst-Laakdal, oil on canvas, 177 x 144 cm.
- The Assumption of Mary 1642, Sint-Gertrudiskerk Vorst-Laakdal, oil on canvas, 174 x 133 cm.
