= Hervé de Lyrot =

French banker and politician

- Born: Leon Hervé Charles de Lyrot; 26 May 1885; Montmorency, Val-d'Oise, France
- Died: 21 June 1956 (aged 71); Paris, France

Hervé de Lyrot (26 May 1885 - 21 June 1956) was a French banker and politician, descended from François de Lyrot de La Patouillère. During World War II he chose to go into exile in England and the United States rather than remain in Vichy France.

Leon Hervé Charles de Lyrot was born on 26 May 1885 in Montmorency, Val-d'Oise. He inherited the title of Count. He made his career in banking. Hervé de Lyrot married Emilie De Villahermose. His wife was the daughter of Auguste Dreyfus, who had made his fortune in the Peruvian guano trade, and Luisa Gonzales Obregon, marquise de Villa Hermosa. Their son, Count Alain Herve de Lyrot, was a reporter and correspondent for the New York Herald Tribune, spokesman for the French Ministry of Information, and then held various jobs related to publication. In 1930 Hervé de Lyrot founded a chair of French at the Catholic University of Lima.

Hervé de Lyrot entered politics in 1932, when he ran for parliament on an anti-cartelist Republican platform and was elected in the second round as deputy for Ille-et-Vilaine. He was reelected to the same seat in 1936 as the Republican and National Union candidate. He supported improving communications and cultural relations between France and various South American republics. He supported improvements to inland waterways in the north and east of France, and electrification of rural communities. He was strongly in favor of giving women the vote, helping organize sessions and present the case for women's suffrage in parliament.

Hervé de Lyrot was absent at the 10 July 1940 vote by the Vichy Congress on giving Marshal Pétain the powers he had demanded. He was concerned about racist threats against his wife, who was of Jewish origin. He and his fellow deputy Henri de Kérillis flew in Hervé de Lyot's plane from Bordeaux to Jersey, from where the English took them to Exeter on 15 June 1940. He was in the United States in September 1942, when he signed a letter sent to General Charles de Gaulle by five members of the French parliament. The other signatories were Kerillis, Pierre Mendès France, Édouard Jonas and Pierre Cot. He left parliament in 1942, and did not seek reelection after France was liberated.

Hervé de Lyrot died in the 16th arrondissement of Paris on 21 June 1956 at the age of 71.
