= Édouard Dreyfus Gonzalez =

French painter

Édouard Vincent Joseph Dreyfus González de Orbegoso, 4th count of Premio Real (1876–1941) was a French Catholic businessman of Jewish descent, a lawyer, painter and writer, who was also an amateur composer under the pseudonym of Jean Dora.

Édouard's grandfather Édouard Dreyfus (1788–1866) was a Jewish shopkeeper in Wissembourg, who moved to Paris. His father, Auguste Dreyfus (1827–1897) had ventured to Peru where he became rich from trading in guano and converted to Catholicism. He married twice, his first wife died in Peru, the second time, again in Peru, he married Luisa María González de Orbegoso, Marquise of Villa Hermosa, who was the mother of Édouard. Édouard graduated as Bachelor of Law (1897), Bachelor of Maritime Law (1897), then Doctor of Law (1903).

He married on 16 March 1907, Anne-Hélène de Talleyrand-Périgrod (1877–1945) and had a son, Luis María Archibaldo, who never officially received the title of Count of Premio Real.

== Paintings ==
- Young Japanese woman

== Essays ==
- Étude sur la condition juridique des artistes peintres en droit romain Paris, 1903

== Songs ==
- Les indolents setting of Verlaine
- Recueillement setting of Baudelaire

== See also ==
- es:Marquesado de Premio Real
