= Auguste Dreyfus =

French businessman

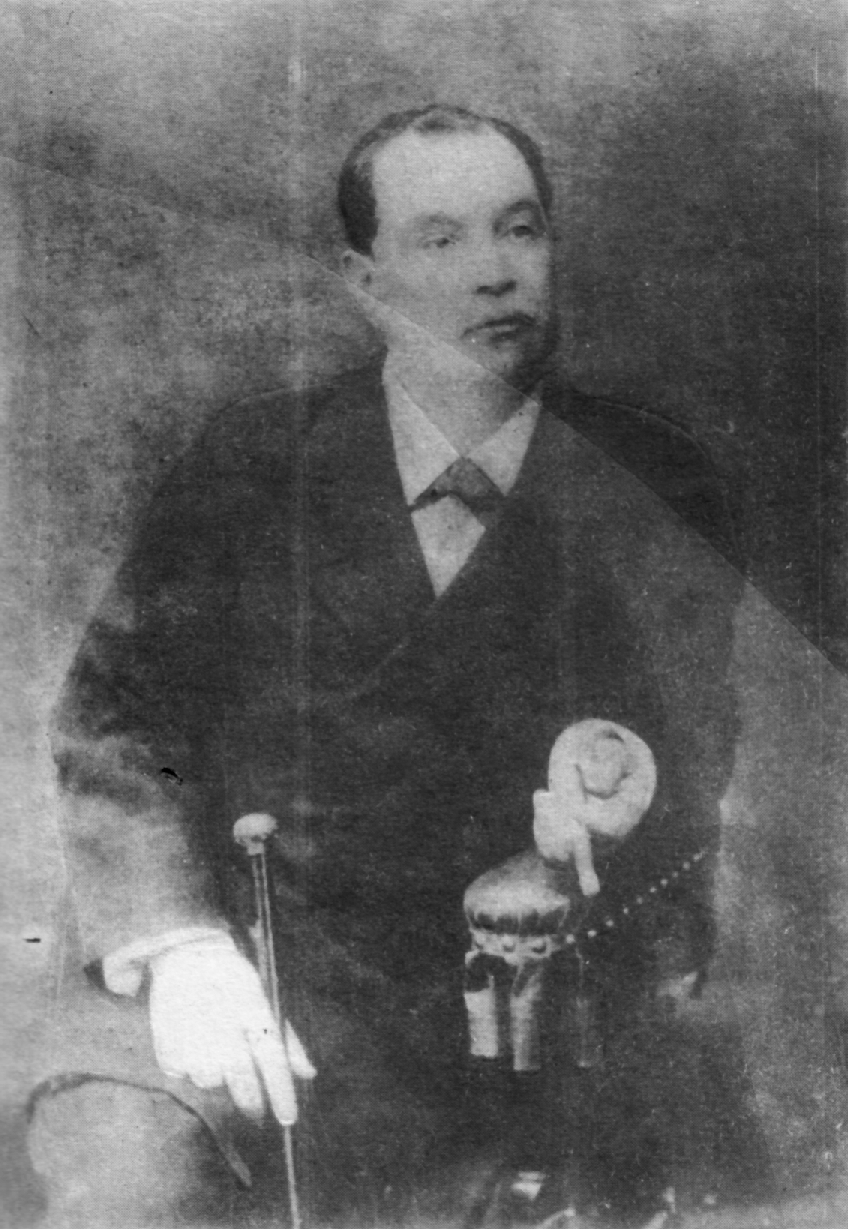
- Born: 28 June 1827; Wissembourg, Bas-Rhin, France
- Died: 25 May 1897 (aged 69); Paris, France
- Occupation: Entrepreneur
- Known for: Guano

Auguste Dreyfus (28 June 1827 – 25 May 1897) was a French businessman who made his fortune by financing the Peruvian trade in guano. (Note: The cold Humboldt Current runs north along the coast of Peru and is rich in fish. It provides food for a huge population of seabirds. The climate is warm and dry, and bird droppings accumulate to great depth, particularly on the Chincha Islands. The guano deposits had great value as fertilizer and played a central role in the Peruvian economy for most of the 19th century.) Dreyfus joined a small textile trading firm set up by three of his elder brothers and moved to Lima, Peru to act as their local representative. He became involved in the guano trade, and in 1869 signed a major contract with the Peruvian government that gave him a monopoly over exports of Peruvian guano to Europe. With this he controlled the largest source of Peruvian national income.

The Peruvian government let Dreyfus act as their agent in managing their existing debt and floating new loans used for railway construction. The government ran into increasing financial difficulties. These were compounded by a war with Chile between 1879 and 1883 in which they lost their key guano-producing province. A lengthy series of lawsuits followed between the creditors whose loans were secured by guano deposits and the governments of Peru and Chile. The Dreyfus trading enterprise came to an end. He retired to France, where he owned a chateau in the country and a mansion in Paris that he filled with a major collection of art.

== Early years ==
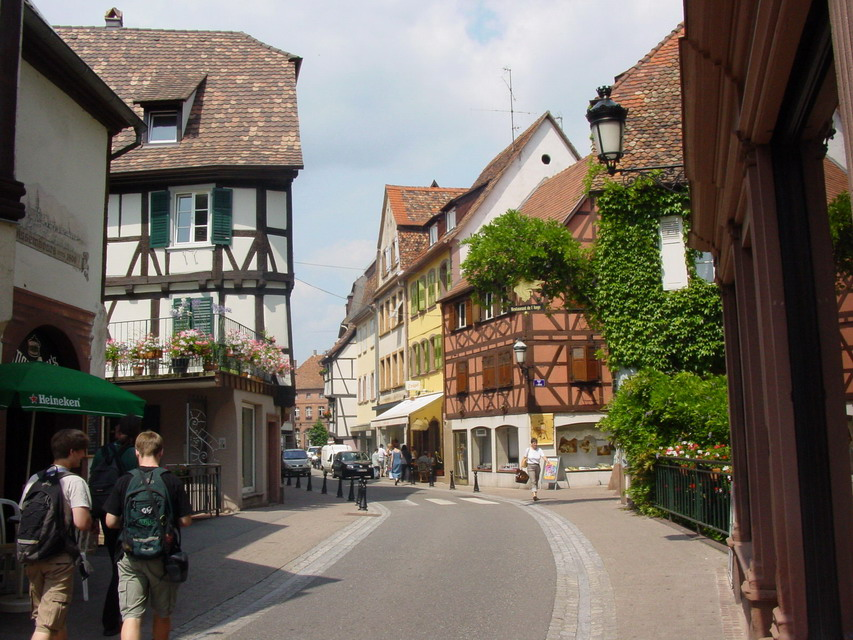
Wissembourg, where Dreyfus was born

Auguste Dreyfus was born into a Jewish family in Wissembourg, Bas-Rhin, on 28 June 1827. He was the tenth of twelve children of the merchant Edward Dreyfus (1788–1866) and his wife Sara Marx (1791–1865). He was the youngest of their seven boys.

On 29 August 1852 Auguste's brothers Prospere, Jérome and Isidore started Dreyfus Frères & Cie. This was a small company in Paris trading in fabrics and other commodities. Auguste Dreyfus joined the company in 1856. By 1859 Auguste Dreyfus, now residing in Peru, had become a minority partner. Auguste began trading in guano, and quickly became wealthy through careful attention to the fluctuations in the global demand for the commodity.

Prospere and Jérôme retired from the business in 1864 and Isidore in 1866. Leon Dreyfus, who had moved to Peru and made influential connections, became a partner on 19 January 1866 and remained associated with Auguste until 1869. Auguste became respected in business circles on both sides of the Atlantic for his skill and the profitability of his enterprises.

== Financier ==
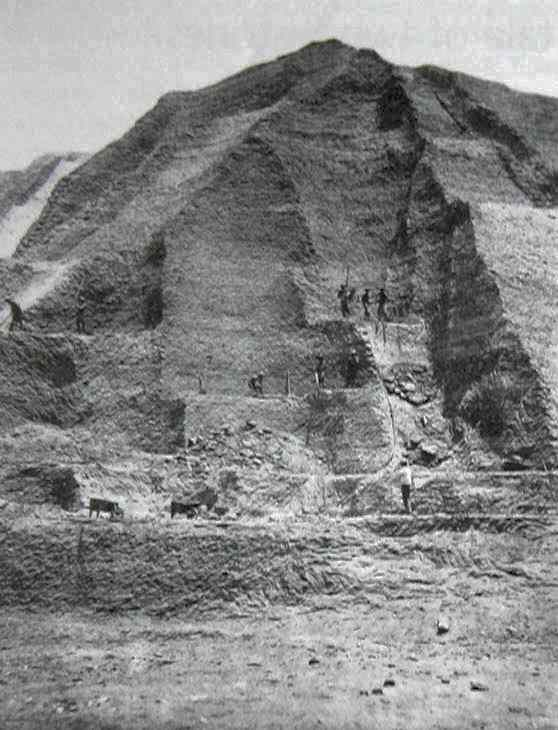
Guano mining in the Chincha Islands, the origin of the Dreyfus fortune

=== Dreyfus contract ===
The government of Peru had been exploiting their guano reserves on a consignment system, in which the state paid contractors to extract, transport and sell it on a cost-plus basis. This encouraged corruption and inefficiency. Contractors were motivated to overstate costs and sell at low prices in order to drive up volumes. By 1868 Peru had large and growing debts. In response to growing public criticism, the government chose a new approach. On 5 July 1869 the government cancelled all consignment arrangements and granted Dreyfus Frères the exclusive right to sell up to two million tons of guano in Europe. Dreyfus was to pay 50 soles (Note: In the 1860s a Peruvian sole was worth almost a dollar. 50 soles was £7.6.) per ton for the guano, a considerably higher price than the government had been receiving up to then.

Auguste Dreyfus was backed by the Société Générale of Paris. Dreyfus arranged for a partnership in which shares were issued with a nominal value of 60 million francs. Société Générale and the international trading house Leiden, Premsel & Cie. both took 22.5 million francs while Dreyfus took 15 million. Each of the major partners in turn distributed shares to subordinate partners. A private addendum to the contract stipulated that Dreyfus's choice of banker would handle Peruvian financial affairs in London. He chose J. Henry Schroder & Co., a bank of the City of London. Schroders would handle the bond issues of 1870 to 1872.

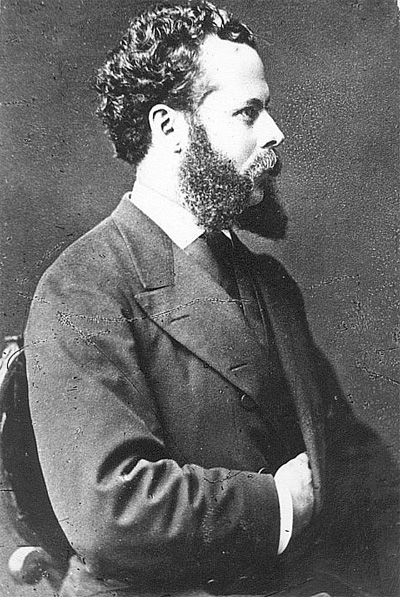
Nicolás de Piérola, the finance minister who arranged the Dreyfus contract and subsequent loans

The royalty payments were to start in the early 1870s as the other contracts expired. In the meantime, Dreyfus would advance the government 2.4 million soles per year and 700,000 soles monthly for the first twenty months. The contract also included clauses through which his company would assume government debts to former guano contractors and foreign bondholders, charging the government 5% interest on this debt until it was paid off. The total debt was 21 million soles. The agreement was ratified on 17 August 1869. The Minister of Finance, who arranged the deal, was Nicolás de Piérola.

The former contractors did not have popular support but fought the contract, which had not been open to competition. In November 1869 the Supreme Court said the contract should be cancelled since it had stripped Peruvian citizens of their rights. The government rejected this ruling, saying it was for the legislature to decide. In November 1870 the Chamber of Deputies approved the contract by 63 votes to 33, and the Senate ratified the decision soon after.

=== Government loans ===
The income provided by the Dreyfus contract was absorbed in payments to an expanding civil service and armed forces.Rather than reduce debts or invest in urgently needed schools or irrigation projects, Pierola used the income from the contract as collateral for additional loans, which President José Balta used for an ambitious plan promoted by Henry Meiggs to build railways in the mountainous Andes country. Dreyfus arranged to float these loans in Europe, one in 1870 for £12 million of 6% bonds sold at 82.5% of face value, and a second in 1872 of 5% bonds sold at 77.5% of face value.Peru had hoped to sell almost £37 million of the 1872 bonds, but investors were concerned about the country's ability to serve its soaring debts, and there were rumors that the guano supplies were running out. Dreyfus and his associates bought most of the £22 million that was issued, paying just £13 million. By 1872 almost all of the government's guano revenue was going to debt interest payments, and the deficit was running at 50%.

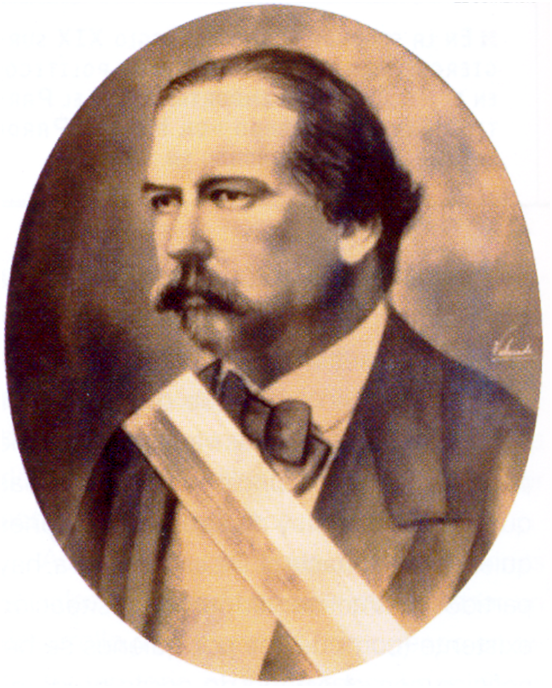
Manuel Pardo, President of Peru (1872–1876), who inherited the debt crisis

The public saw no return from the railway projects, and in May 1872 elected Manuel Pardo as President, a popular former mayor of Lima. An attempted coup d'état before Pardo took power did not succeed. Pardo inherited a financial crisis. The best-quality and most accessible guano had already been extracted, so prices were falling and costs rising. Pardo reduced the size of the army by three-quarters and canceled two orders for battleships from Britain, but continued the railway construction program. He allowed Dreyfus to continue with the last bond issue, which proved a failure. Only £8.3 million was raised, one quarter of what had been hoped. The money mainly went to paying Dreyfus and refinancing debts.

Dreyfus now began suffering from the declining quality of the remaining guano and from competition with artificial fertilizer manufactured in Germany. In November 1873 Dreyfus announced that he no longer had enough income to service Peru's foreign debt. The government responded by withdrawing Dreyfus's permit to ship guano, and stated that bondholders of the two loans had first claim on Peruvian guano, ahead of Dreyfus. The government threatened to sue Dreyfus in Europe if he failed to meet his payments on the loans. An agreement was reaching in April 1874 under which Dreyfus could export another 850,000 tons of guano, the remainder of the 2 million tons agreed in the contract, and Dreyfus would continue to service the foreign debt until 1 July 1875. Dreyfus would also advance cash to the government based on the gross value of the guano extracted.

=== Later operations ===
On 1 January 1876, the Peruvian government defaulted on payments on its foreign debt. Peru reserved 100,000 tons of guano as security for the payments they had missed. In March 1876, a new contract for guano sales was agreed with the Peruvian Guano Company, formed by the London merchant bank Raphael & Sons, and the Peruvians Carlos Gonzales Candamo and Arturo Heeren. On 31 March, Peru concluded a contract with the Société Générale of Paris for the sale of guano. Manuel Pardo's presidency ended among growing economic problems compounded by civil unrest and a brewing crisis with Chile. He was succeeded by General Mariano Ignacio Prado, to whom he had lent his support. One of Prado's first acts was to travel to London, where on 7 June 1876, he signed an agreement by which Peru sold 1,900,000 tons of guano to Raphael's consortium.

The Dreyfus contract expired on 31 October 1876, leaving Dreyfus Brothers with about half a million tons of unsold guano. It was expected to take until mid-1878 to clear this inventory. The competing Peruvian Guano Company was handicapped by terms that favored Peru, and until 1879 was not allowed to sell at competitive prices. Dreyfus had large stocks of higher-quality guano and continued to dominate the global market. The Peruvian Guano Company's bondholders tried to sue Dreyfus for a share of his guano revenue, but failed.

In February 1879 the War of the Pacific broke out between Chile and Bolivia with Peru. One of the causes was the 1875 nationalization by Peru of nitrate production facilities in Tarapacá province, many of them owned by Chilean companies. Chile quickly seized control of the main ports through which guano was exported and also Tarapacá, a key source of guano as well as of nitrates. By late 1879 the Peruvian government still owed Dreyfus £4 million, secured by the country's remaining reserves of guano. In December 1879, President Prado left Peru and was replaced by Nicolás de Piérola. In January, Piérola and Dreyfus agreed on a new contract under which the government recognized a debt to Dreyfus of 21 million soles, or £4 million, to be recovered by Dreyfus through further sales of guano. Dreyfus was to export only to markets that the Peruvian Guano Company was not serving. The British protested against the agreement, but were not supported by the French.

On 30 June 1880, a new agreement was made between Peru and Dreyfus to consolidate its debt. Peru would give up control of its railways for twenty-five years and pay Dreyfus £3,214,388 (equivalent to £447 million in 2024). About the same time, the Chilean government agreed to give the bondholders of the Peruvian Guano Company the right to export guano from the occupied territories. Chile occupied Lima in January 1881, effectively deciding the war, although a guerrilla struggle continued. On 9 February 1882, a new agreement was made with Chile in which that country would sell one million tons of guano from Tarapacá to the highest bidder, with half the profit going to creditors of Peru whose claims were secured by the guano, including Dreyfus. Chile probably made this concession to avoid intervention by the creditor governments. The Treaty of Ancón, signed on 20 October 1883, ended the war. Chile acquired Tarapacá permanently.

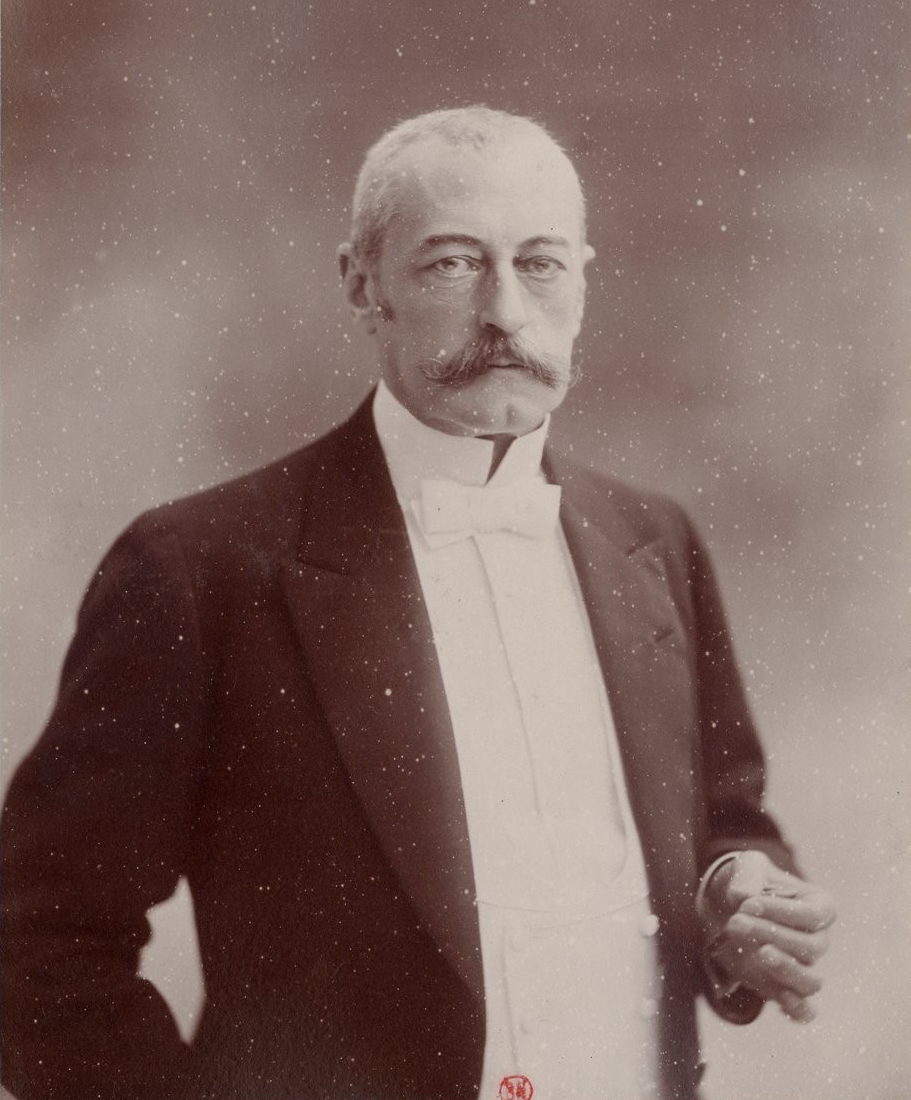
Pierre Waldeck-Rousseau, who defended Dreyfus and was named as the executor of his will

In the years that followed Dreyfus, the bondholders of the Peruvian Guano Company and other creditors, sometimes backed by the French or British governments, made conflicting claims against Chile and Peru with limited success. Dreyfus chose Waldeck-Rousseau, a prominent Republican who had been Minister of the Interior in 1884, as his advocate in his case against the Société Générale, formerly his partner.

== Personal life ==
=== Family and friends ===
Dreyfus converted to Catholicism shortly before his marriage in Lima with the Peruvian Sofia Bergman on 15 August 1862. His wife's brothers, Charles and Frederick Bergman, won a contract in August 1869 to build and run dock facilities in the port of Callao, which they sold to the Société Générale in 1874. Sofia Bergman died in Lima in 1871. Dreyfus married his second wife in Lima on 8 January 1873. Luisa González de Andia y Orbegoso (1847–1924), Marquise de Villahermosa, was granddaughter of Marshal Luis José de Orbegoso, one of the first presidents of the Republic of Peru.

Two sons and two daughters were born of Dreyfus's second marriage. Louis Dreyfus (1874–1965), was successively authorized by decree of 12 August 1885 to call himself Dreyfus-Gonzalez de Andia, then in 1925 by Alfonso XIII of Spain, to assume, contrary to the Spanish noble usage, the title of his mother, who died a year before, and finally, by decree of 26 July 1935, to remove Dreyfus from his name. Louis married Félicie de Talleyrand-Périgord, daughter of Archambaud de Talleyrand-Périgord, duke of Dino and Marie de Gontaut-Biron. Édouard Dreyfus Gonzalez (1876–1941) was a lawyer and Count of Premio Real. He wrote songs under the name Jean Dora. He married Anne-Hélène de Talleyrand-Périgord, sister of Félicie. Emilie Dreyfus married the viscount, banker and politician Hervé de Lyrot. Her sister married René de Lyrot.

Dreyfus was described in 1886 as having great vigor and agility, despite being somewhat overweight. He was a good friend of the President of France, Jules Grévy. Grévy supported Dreyfus in his claims against Peru. Despite his conversion, Dreyfus was a target of anti-Semites such as Édouard Drumont in his 1888 polemic La France juive (Jewish France). His children would also suffer from anti-semitism.

Dreyfus died in Paris on 25 May 1897.

=== Art collector ===
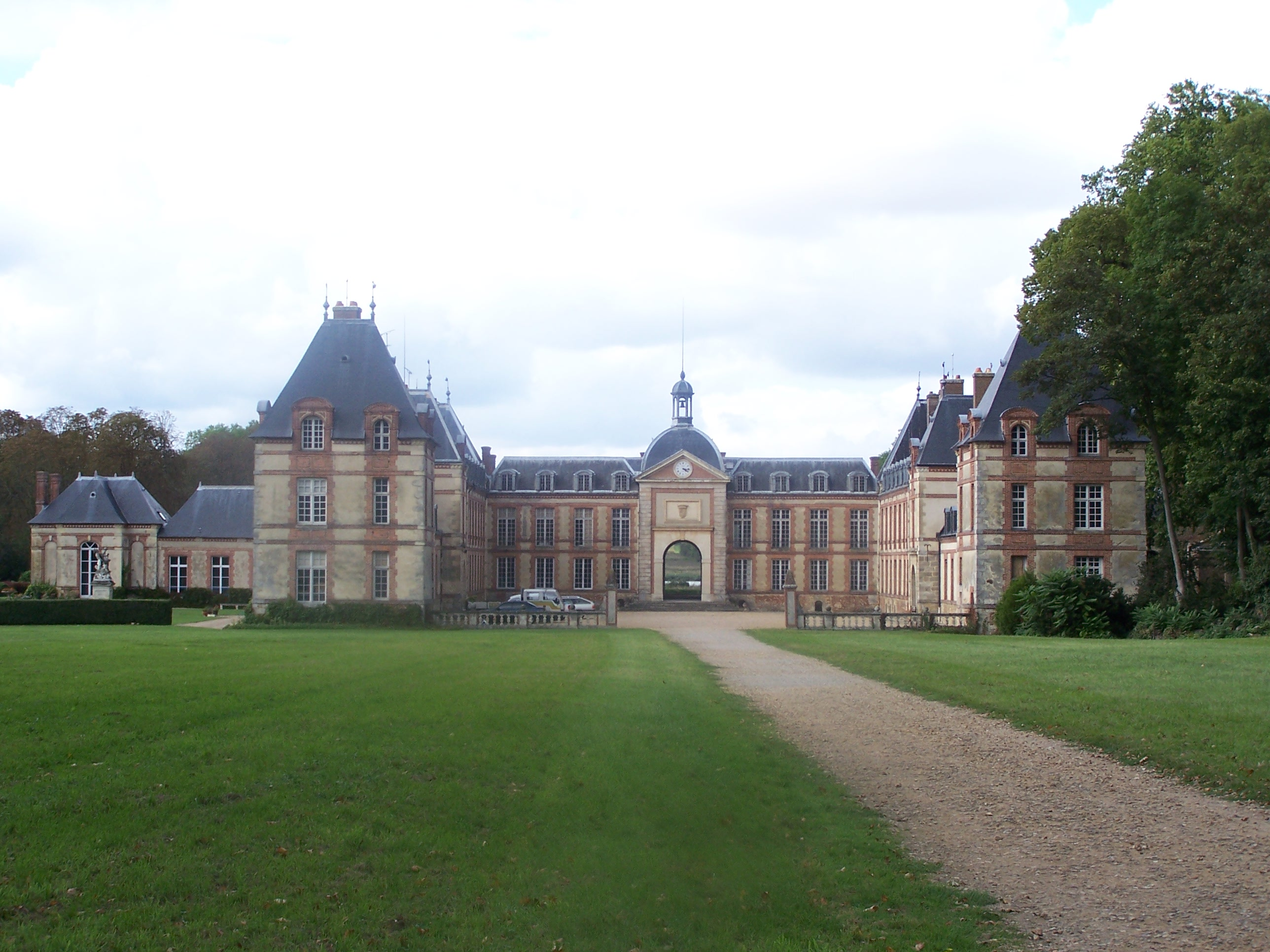
Château de Pontchartrain, which Dreyfus purchased in 1888

In November 1874 Dreyfus bought an imposing neo-classical hotel at 3 Rue Ruysdael. There he accumulated an extraordinary art collection, which he inventoried in detail in 1887. Dreyfus showed objects in the Peru pavilion at the Exposition Universelle (1878) in Paris, including furniture encrusted with pearls and objects of art. He also sent three mummies from Peru to the Paris Anthropological society in 1878. In June 1888 Dreyfus bought the domain of the Château de Pontchartrain from Count Guido Henckel von Donnersmarck. In 1891 the architect Émile Boeswillwald was given the task of restoring the chateau.

In June 1889 Dreyfus sold 116 items from his collection, realizing 861,000 francs. In June 1896 the Dreyfus-Gonzalez collection was sold at public auction in Paris, and included among other valuables four candelabra called "the sirens and garlands of leaves" (c. 1783–1784) attributed to the great bronze sculptor François Remond and coming from a series of six that were part of the furniture of the Parisian hotel of the second Duke of Praslin (1735–1791), which were acquired by the Duke of Hamilton. They were sold to Dreyfus in 1882.

==== The Alliance Tapestry ====
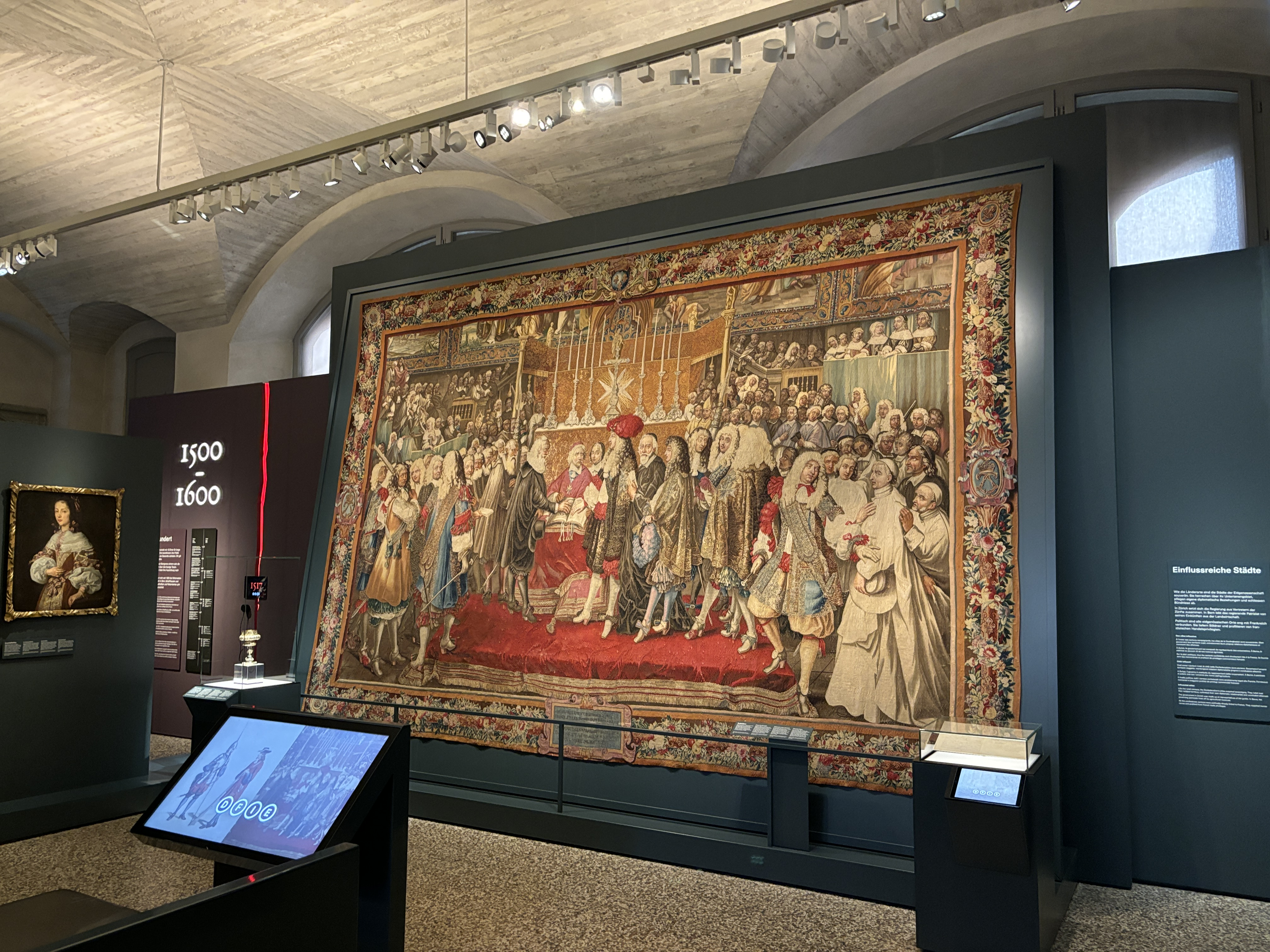
The Alliance Tapestry in the Swiss National Museum, formerly the Dreyfus-de Gonzalès Collection.

As part of the sale in June 1896 in Paris, one of the once seven Alliance Tapestries was sold. Only four of these royal tapestries, entitled Renewal of the alliance with the Swiss, have survived. The one from the Dreyfus-de Gonzalès Collection (name Frenchified) was acquired by the Gottfried Keller Foundation for FRF 88,000, which at that time corresponded to roughly the same amount in Swiss francs. At the auction in Paris, the Gottfried Keller Foundation was represented by Heinrich Angst (1847–1922), the first director of the Swiss National Museum. Heinrich Angst acquired the tapestry for the Gottfried Keller Foundation in order to exhibit it in the Swiss National Museum in Zürich. This tapestry, now called the Zürich copy, is from the fourth edition. It was created between 1729 and 1734. Until the French Revolution, this tapestry was kept in the Embassy of France in Rome (presumably until the beginning of 1791). In 1793, the tapestry was apparently in the possession of Cardinal François-Joachim de Pierre de Bernis, the French ambassador in Rome. However, the cardinal considered the tapestry the property of King Louis XVI and therefore held it in safekeeping for the king. After the cardinal's death in 1794, the tapestry's whereabouts are unknown until its auction in 1896. In addition to the copy in the Swiss National Museum, there is also a copy in the Château de Versailles, in the Museum of the Gobelins Manufactory (Mobilier National) and in the Hôtel de Besenval in Paris.
