= Henri de Kérillis =

French politician and writer (1889–1958)

Henri Calloc'h de Kérillis
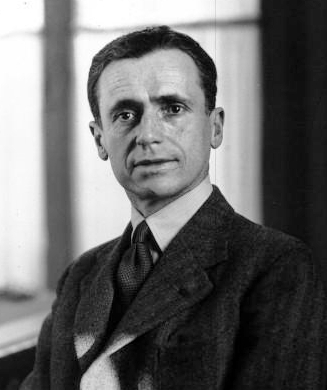
- Henri de Kérillis in 1936
- Born: 27 October 1889; Vertheuil, Gironde, France
- Died: 11 April 1958 (aged 68); Long Island, New York, United States
- Occupation: Politician

Henri Calloc'h de Kérillis (27 October 1889 – 11 April 1958) was a French aviator, reporter, writer and politician. A hero of World War I, he traveled widely in the 1920s, and wrote several books about his adventures. He became a journalist, then entered politics as an independent Republican. He was right-wing, conservative and profoundly nationalist. He was hostile to the parties that favored appeasement of Germany in the lead-up to World War II, and went into exile rather than be arrested after the armistice of July 1940. At first a strong supporter of Charles de Gaulle and his Free French, he later fell out with de Gaulle too. He spent the last years of his life in voluntary exile in the United States.

== Early career ==
Henri de Kérillis was born on 27 October 1889 at Vertheuil, Gironde. His parents were rear-Admiral Henri Calloc'h de Kérillis (1856–1940) and Louise Antoinette d'Elbauve (1864–1931). His family background was military, and he was expected to also follow a military career. He graduated from the Cavalry School at Saumur as a second-lieutenant. On 29 June 1914 he married Anne Demaison (1891-1954). They had two children.

In World War I de Kérillis was at first a cavalry lieutenant. He participated in the raid of the Gironde Squadron behind enemy lines in Belgium on 10 September 1914. He was wounded, and was made a knight of the Legion of Honor. He joined the air force, where he was known for his bravery. In June 1916 he led a reprisal raid on Karlsruhe killing 117 defenseless people, including 30 men, 5 women and 82 children. He flew 256 missions, was cited six times and made an officer of the Legion of Honor. He suffered a serious injury, requiring trepanning. He then joined the Under-Secretary of State for Aeronautics, where he was responsible for monitoring the bomber fleet.

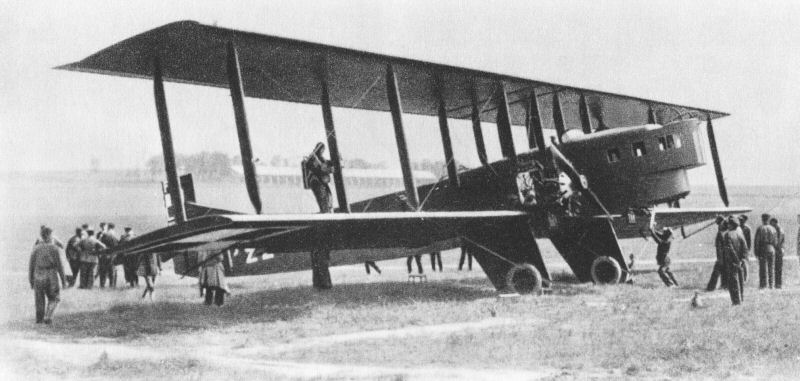
Farman F-68BN4 Goliath 1919

When the war ended, de Kérillis resigned from the army. Until 1926 he was a director of the Farman Aviation Works. For this company he visited England and America, and spent six months in Cuba installing the first aerodrome there. He participated in a mission led by Gaston Gradis to cross the Sahara from Colomb-Béchar in Algeria to Savé in Dahomey (now Benin) between 15 November and 3 December 1924. He recorded the experience in his first book, De l'Algérie au Dahomey en automobile (1925).

De Kérillis began working for l'Écho de Paris, first as a reporter of major stories, then as chief of domestic politics. He continued to travel widely and to meet leading political figures in the countries he visited. He recorded his experiences and views in Du Pacifique à la mer Morte (From the Pacific to the Dead Sea), Faisons le point (Taking Stock) and L'Italie nouvelle (The New Italy). He published his political views in the Echo de Paris and then in the Epoque. In 1925 he was in Syria, reporting for l'Écho de Paris during the Great Syrian Revolt. He blamed the events on the high commissioner, General Maurice Sarrail, who he said had ignored warnings of trouble.

== Political views ==
De Kérillis had right-wing, conservative and nationalist political views.

He was early to point out the danger of German aggression and the need to resist. As early as April 1920, in an article in l'Écho de Paris he pointed out the danger of German civil aviation, which had not been mentioned in the Treaty of Versailles but could easily be converted for use in transport and bombing.

De Kérillis was not opposed to fascist regimes in Italy and Spain. During the Italian invasion of Ethiopia (October 1935 to May 1936), de Kérillis strongly opposed Édouard Herriot, who supported the Ethiopians and had pro-Communist views. He published vicious attacks on Herriot in l'Echo de Paris throughout the crisis. He saw racism as the new ideology of totalitarian regimes, and called it "le ciment des dictatures" in a November 1938 article in l'Époque. However, he supported Benito Mussolini, noting that his Fascism did not discriminate on the basis of race or religion, as Nazism did and that many Jews had joined the party.

During the Spanish Civil War (July 1936 to April 1939), he considered that France should have helped General Franco to prevent him from having to become aligned with Germany and Italy. On June 18, 1937, an article De Kérillis wrote was published in L'Époque where he attacked François Mauriac for his criticism of Catholics and the Catholic Church supporting Franco's treatment of the Basque people in Spain. He argued it was the Republican government's fault for making Franco resort to such actions, saying "Mr. Academician, your ancient people are a heroic people whom we love and whose martyrdom fills us with despair. But they are victims of senseless, ambitious, and insane politicians who bear responsibility for all the bloodshed and so much misery.".

== Candidate and deputy ==
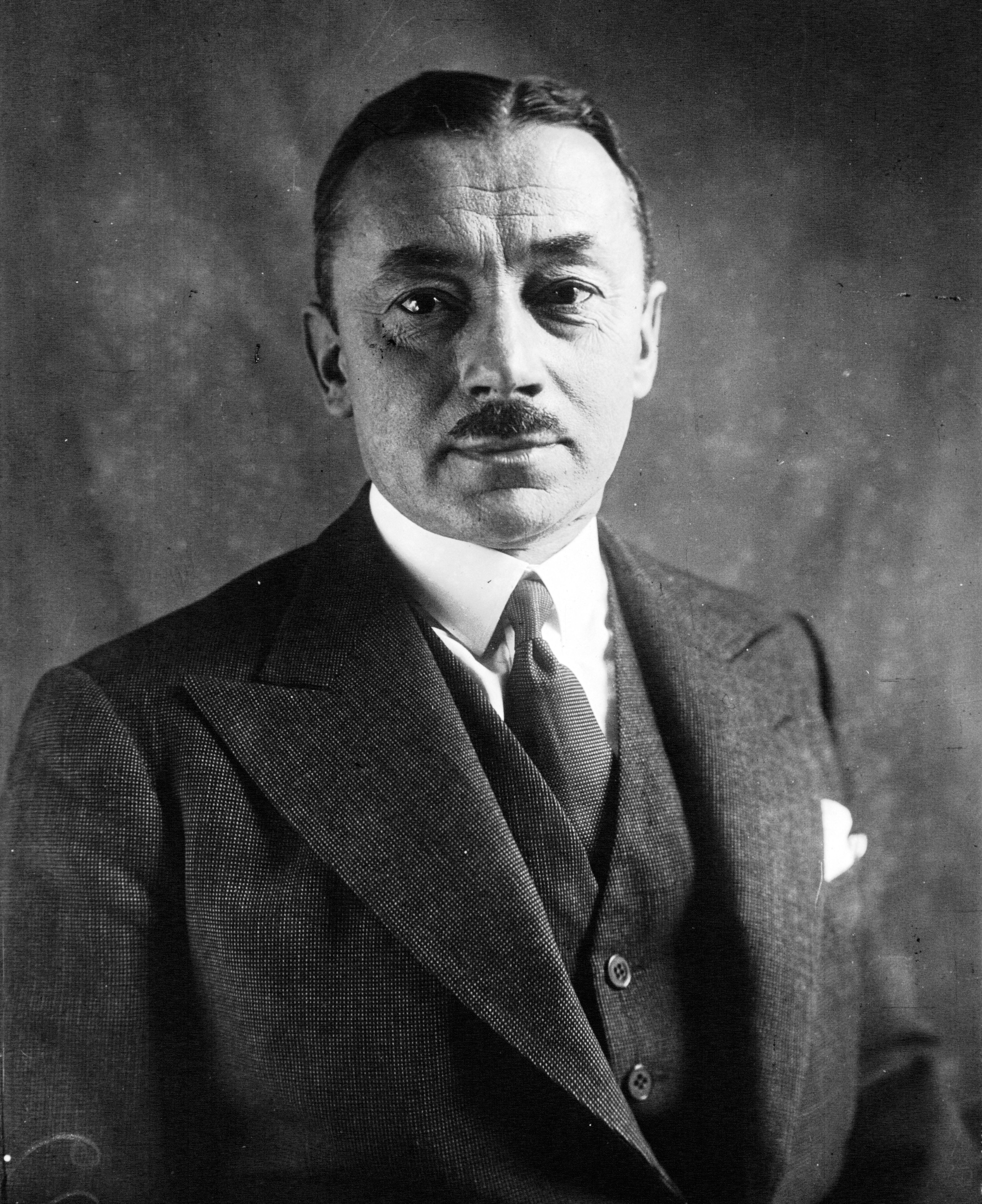
Paul Reynaud, whom de Kérillis sometimes supported, sometimes opposed

In 1926 de Kérillis was on the list headed by Paul Reynaud in a by-election in the 2nd sector of Paris. After a vigorous campaign, Raynaud and de Kérillis were beaten in the second round by a list headed by the communist Jacques Duclos. Seeing the poor organization of the national parties, he founded a "Center of National Republican propaganda" which provided opinion pieces in journals, helped candidates with leaflets, posters and films, and organized committees and speakers. The Center aimed to pull together conservatives into a united party supporting André Tardieu. In this he was opposed by Victor Perret, who felt this was a distraction from the Republican Federation.

In 1932 de Kérillis tried for election in the 7th arrondissement of Paris, but was defeated. He finally won election to parliament in the elections of 26 April 1936. In parliament, de Kérillis was an independent Republican. He was a member of the Committee on Foreign Affairs. He opposed the cabinets of Léon Blum and Camille Chautemps, supported that of Édouard Daladier and opposed that of Paul Reynaud. He opposed the 40-hour week law and the law for resolution of labor disputes, and voted for paid leave. His main activity was in foreign affairs, where he was against the pacifist policy of the left-wing Popular Front, and expressed concern about France's military weakness.

De Kérillis was the only conservative deputy to vote against the Munich Agreement. He described the agreement as shameful. He said that Germany was insatiable, respected only the strong and would show no pity to the weak, which France had shown herself to be. He said that far from becoming peaceful, Germany would become more demanding and terrible. In January 1939 he again spoke on foreign policy, saying that each time France abandoned an ally, she became weaker and less secure. He alternated between opposing an alliance with Russia, which he saw as interfering in French politics through the Communist party, and supporting an eastern alliance. By 1940 he was in favor of a broad coalition of states in Western, Central and Eastern Europe, including the USSR, to preserve the peace. In a January 1940 debate, he opposed expelling communists from parliament, calling those who supported the measure defeatist and pro-German.

== Exile ==
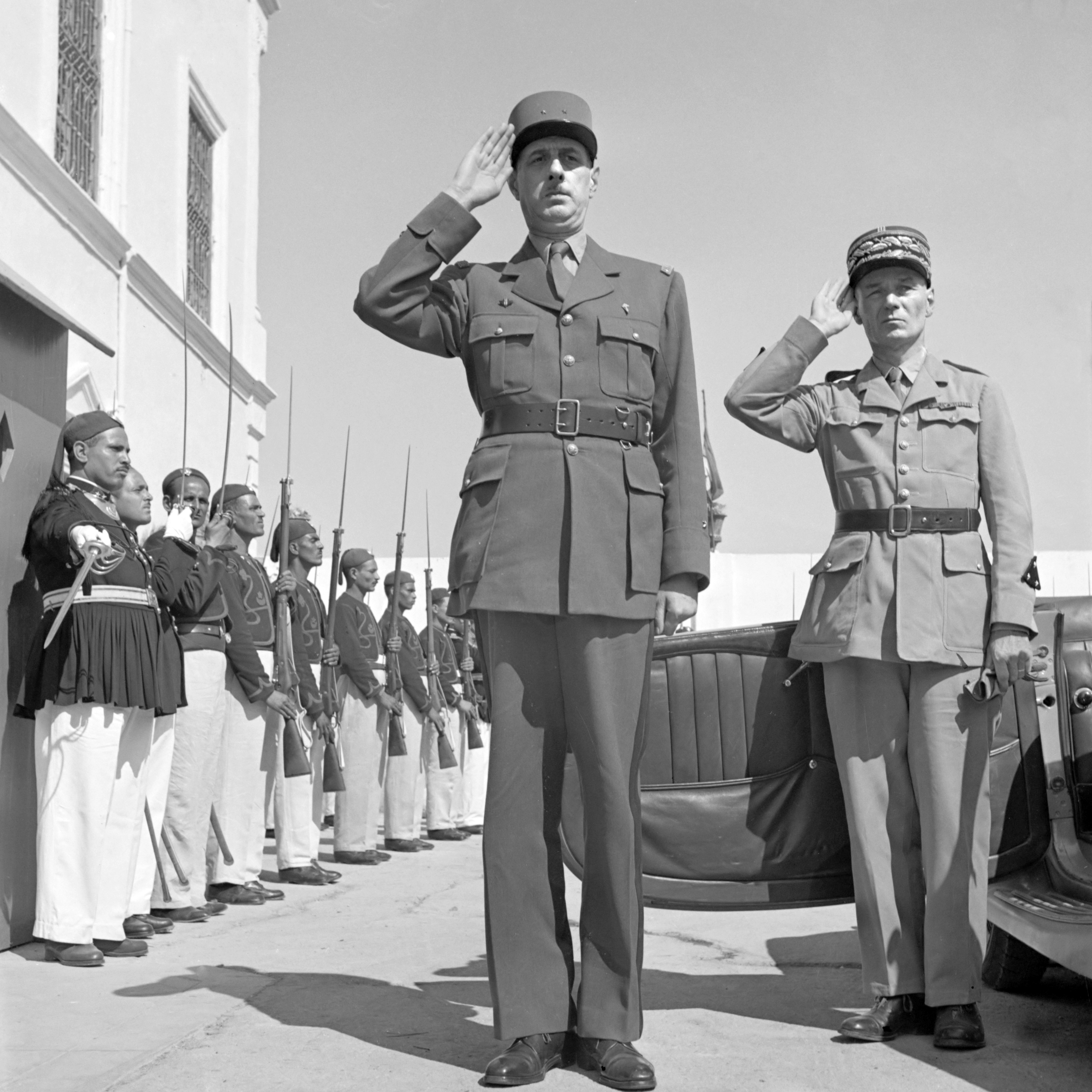
Charles de Gaulle in Tunisia, 1943

When Reynaud's cabinet fell on 16 June 1940, de Kérillis flew in a small plane piloted by his brother Hervé from Bordeaux to Jersey, from where the English took them to Exeter on 15 June 1940. De Kérillis met General Charles de Gaulle in London before going on to New York. He reached the United States in mid-July. He was not present in Vichy on 10 July 1940 when Marshal Philippe Pétain was voted full powers. De Kérillis was expelled from the Legion of Honor and his property was confiscated. He was deprived of French nationality in the summer of 1940, and was sentenced to death in absentia. His son Alain was arrested. De Kérillis never saw him again.

Geneviève Tabouis, a friend of the Roosevelts and passionate anti-Nazi, created a weekly journal Pour la victoire (For Victory) that first appeared in January 1942. De Kérillis wrote the main editorials for the journal. De Kérillis persuaded prominent writers to contribute to the journal, including Jacques Maritain, Ève Curie, Claude Lévi-Strauss, André Breton, Henri Peyre, Julien Green and Antoine de Saint-Exupéry. At first he was a strong supporter of de Gaulle in the United States and Canada. In September 1942 de Kérillis published Français, voici la vérité (French people, here is the truth) in which he criticized the government of Marshal Petain and praised General Charles de Gaulle. In September 1942 he signed a letter sent to General Charles de Gaulle by five members of the French parliament. The other signatories were Édouard Jonas, Hervé de Lyrot, Pierre Mendès France and Pierre Cot. De Kérillis sympathized with de Gaulle's difficulty, saying in a letter to him,

Wherever there are twenty Frenchmen they fight among themselves. There are those for de Gaulle and those against him, those for him and against the British, those for the British and against him, those for Pétain, those for Weygand, and those for Laval. There are also the fools, the cowards and those who are afraid. There is all and everything. The terrible tragedy has taught them nothing and has changed nothing.

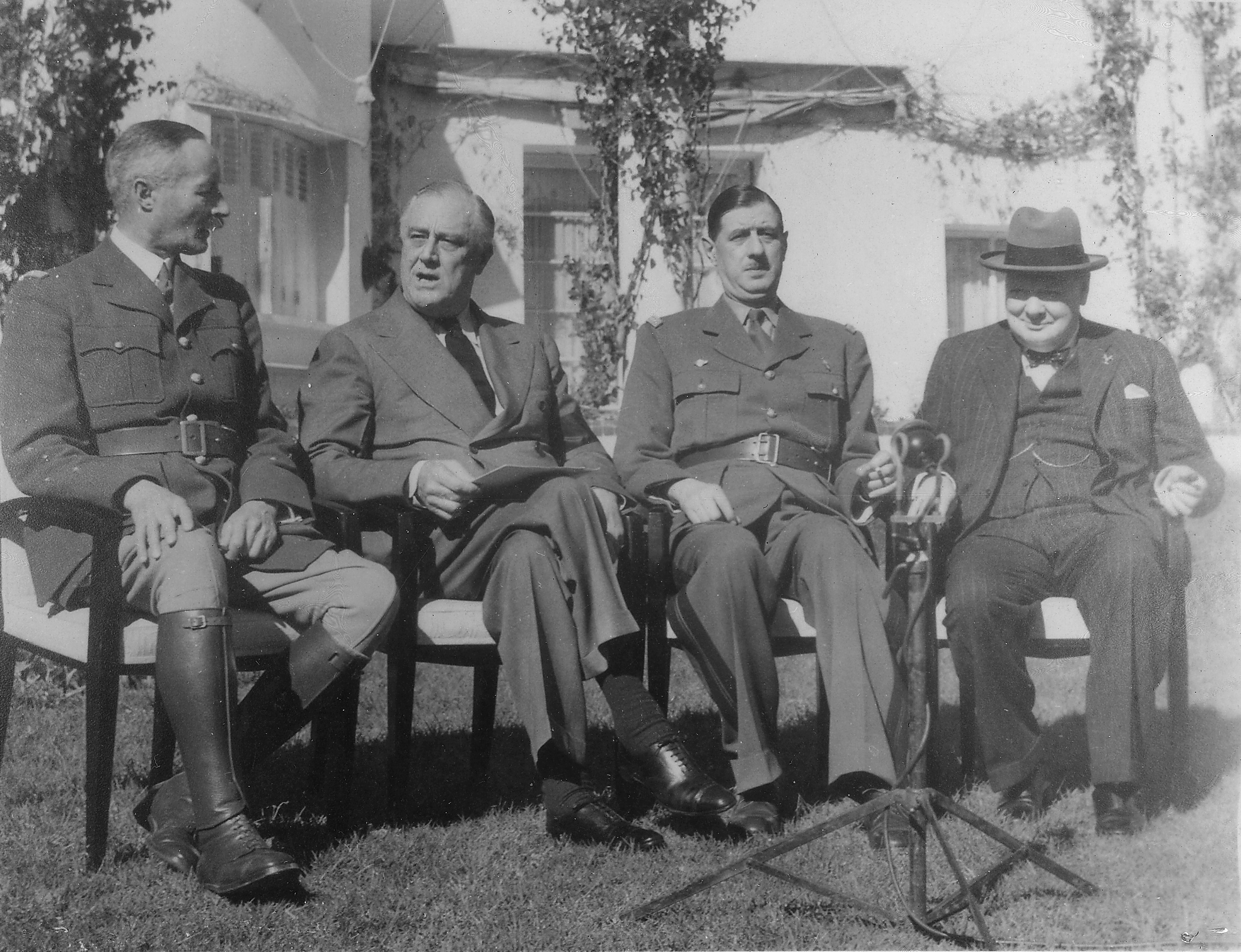
Henri Giraud (left) and Charles de Gaulle sit down after shaking hands in presence of Franklin D. Roosevelt and Winston Churchill at the Casablanca Conference on 14 January 1943, in an insincere public display of unity.

By 1943 de Kérillis had become hostile to de Gaulle. The turning point came when de Gaulle began to assume total control of the Free French movement, both military and political, starting with his attacks on General Henri Giraud in North Africa. His hostility deepened when de Gaulle brought communists into the government in exile, since de Kérillis considered that the communists had betrayed France by supporting the Molotov–Ribbentrop Pact. He was among the prominent refugees from France who created friction between de Gaulle and Franklin D. Roosevelt.

De Kérillis left Pour la victoire in December 1944. In October 1945 he published a work called De Gaulle dictateur. In it he accused de Gaulle of having lost sight of his first objective of liberating France in favor of his personal political ambitions. He said that de Gaulle's entourage included former "Cagoulards", extreme right wing terrorists who had tried to destabilize the 3rd Republic in the 1930s. He described André Dewavrin ("Colonel Passy") as de Gaulle's "evil genius", describing him as the "all powerful head of the Gaullist Gestapo."

De Kérillis chose voluntary exile in the United States after the war rather than return to a France "humiliated and enslaved by her new masters." He died on 11 April 1958 at his farm on Long Island, New York.

== Awards and decorations ==
- Officer of the Légion d'Honneur
- Croix de guerre 1914-1918

== Bibliography ==
- Kérillis, Henri de (1925). De l'Algérie au Dahomey en automobile: voyage effectué par la seconde mission Gradis à travers le Sahara, le Soudan, le territoire du Niger et le Dahomey (15 novembre-11 décembre 1924) avec 65 illustrations hors texte et une carte. Plon-Nourrit et Cie.
- Kérillis, Henri de (1930). Du pacifique á la Mer Morte: notes d'un journaliste : États-Unis-Palestine-Pays Baltes. Spes.
- Kérillis, Henri de (1936). Français, voici la guerre! ... Éditions Bernard Grasset.
- Kérillis, Henri de; Cartier, Raymond (1939). Kérillis on the Causes of the War. Putnam.
- Kérillis, Henri de (1942). Français, voici la vérité!. Éditions de la Maison française, Incorporated.
- Kérillis, Henri de (1945). De Gaulle dictateur. Défense Republicaine.
- Kérillis, Henri de (1946). I accuse De Gaulle. Harcourt, Brace and Company.
- Mauthner, Martin (2016): Otto Abetz and His Paris Acolytes - French Writers Who Flirted with Fascism, 1930–1945. UK: Sussex Academic Press. ISBN 978-1-84519-784-1
