= Victor Perret =

French politician

- Born: Lyon
- Died: 1941; Lyon
- Occupation: Politician

Victor Perret (died 1941) was a right-wing French politician active in the 1920s and 1930s.

== Early years ==
Perret was born in Lyon to a conservative Catholic bourgeois family in that city. His father was a silk merchant-manufacturer, and Perret continued in that business. He fought in the trenches during World War I.

== Political career ==
Perret joined the Fédération Nationale Catholique, a pressure group, when it was founded in 1924 to resist the anti-clericalism of the Cartel des Gauches, the left-wing coalition. The Fédération Républicaine (FR) was re-founded by Louis Marin in 1925, with a nationalist and right wing agenda. Victor Perret supported Marin in Lyon. Perret's Lyon branch of the party set up committees, student groups, worker groups, a boules federation, social centers and a charity to assist with housing.

Perret opposed efforts by Henri de Kérillis to pull together conservatives into a united party supporting André Tardieu, thinking the Fédération Républicaine could represent the right on its own. In 1928 he was president-delegate to the Fédération Républicaine du Rhône, and vice-president of the national party, which broke with the moderation of the progressive republicans of the late nineteenth century. The party took an increasingly radical right-wing position, and became more receptive to the views of its rank and file members. Perret introduced a populist style, where corporatist ideas were accompanied by criticism of economic liberalism and even capitalism.

By mid-1932 the faction led by Perret, hostile to social reform and uncommitted to parliamentary democracy, dominated the Fédération Républicaine du Rhône. On 13 January 1934 Perret published an article called Crise de moralité criticizing the parliamentary system, which he and other leaders of the Fédération Républicaine saw as both corrupt and ineffective. He became one of the most influential of the FR's vice-presidents. On 24 July 1934 he wrote to André Tardieu that the time was ripe for a great clean-up. In 1940, after the Fédération had ceased to operate at the national level, Perret was a strong supporter of the Vichy regime. In his view, the republic had caused the debacle and had thus eliminated itself.

Victor Perret died in August 1941.

== Beliefs ==
In Perret's concept of corporatism, both workers and managers would belong to mixed unions, learning to understand each other, as opposed to the confrontational approach promoted by revolutionary trade unions. Perret was in favor of compulsory membership in corporatist groups to prevent big business from dominating industries. Perret saw the masses as being vulnerable to demagogues unless they were given guidance from the elite. Perret believed in strong top-down leadership, and set an example through his unquestioning belief in Marin. He said the party should not look to leadership from notables but should call upon activists, who were the true servants of the people.

Perret thought parliamentarians had too much influence in the party. He distrusted the press, who he thought had sold out to the government and business interests. Perret strongly believed in the importance of Christianity in ensuring support by all classes of the traditional ties to one's family, profession and nation. He linked protection of private property to Christian beliefs, and wanted to purge teachers who did not promote that religion from the schools.
