= Lukas Achtschelling =

Flemish landscape painter

Lukas Achtschelling (born c. 1570) was a landscape painter from Brussels, Habsburg Netherlands.

The Dresdner gallery has owned two small pieces by him, and the Cathedral of St. Michael and St. Gudula three pieces. He was probably the grandfather of the landscape painter with the same name, Lucas Achtschellinck.
