= Pieter van der Borcht (III) =

Flemish painter

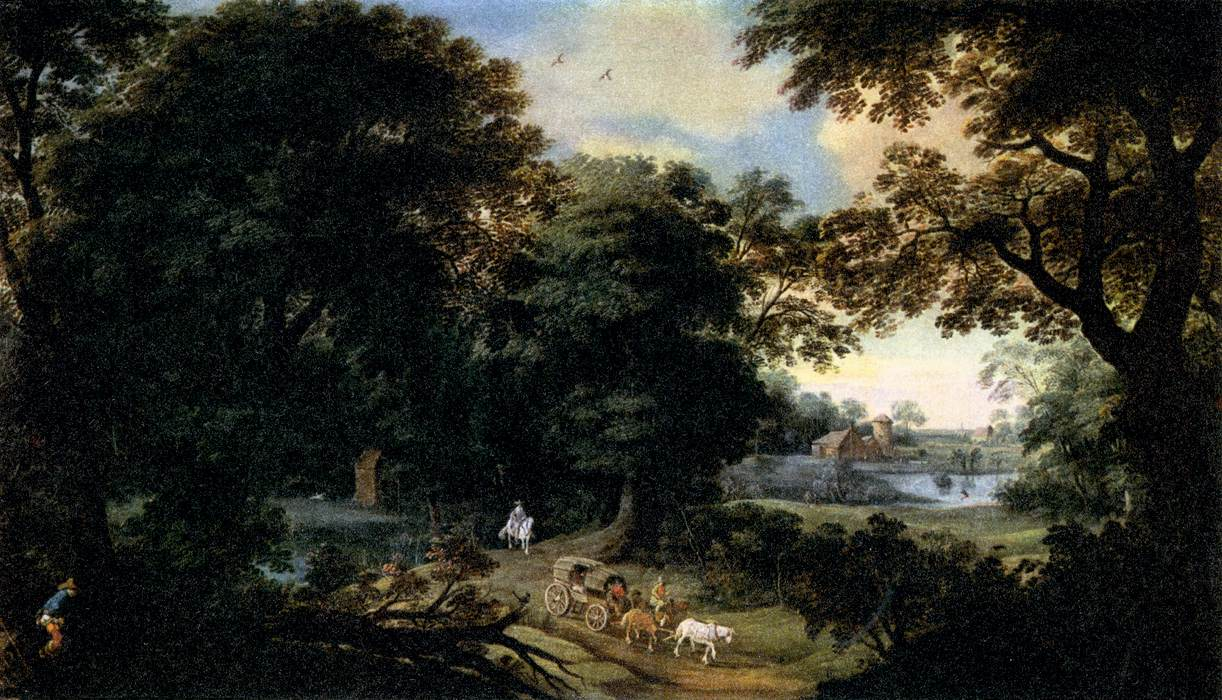
Forest landscape

Pieter van der Borcht (III) (c. 1589–1662) was a Flemish painter and draftsman. He was originally a figure painter, but later switched to landscape painting.

== Life ==
There are few details known about the life of the artist. He was likely born between 1588 and 1590. Pieter van der Borcht was born and died in Brussels, according to 17th-century Flemish art historian Cornelis de Bie's work on painters called Het Gulden Cabinet. He was a pupil of the prominent Brussels painter of landscapes and civil celebrations Denis van Alsloot from 1604. He became a member of the Guild of Saint Luke in 1625.

He must have traveled to Augsburg in or around 1615 as a work mentioned in the Hofstede de Groot Index Cards was inscribed: "Peeter van der Borcht van Brussel in Ausborch. 1615."

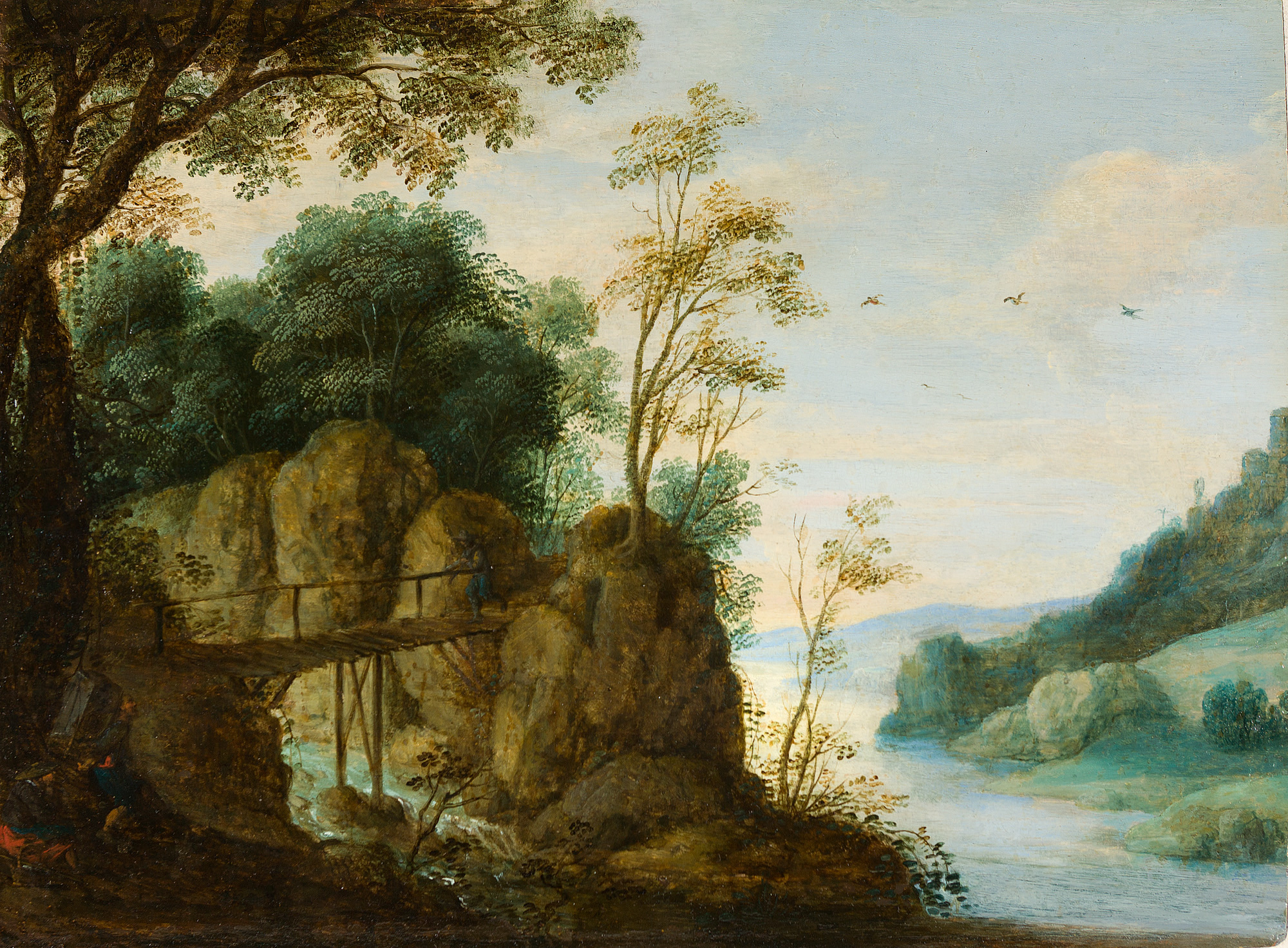
Rocky river landscape with a wooden bridge and travelers

He was the master of Lucas Achtschellinck.

== Work ==
It is difficult to attribute works to the artist with certainty as there are multiple artists from Brussels with the same name or who signed with the same last name during the 16th and 17th century. Dated works by him are known until 1631. Cornelis de Bie states that van der Borcht first painted figures, then switched to landscapes.

One landscape by him is signed "Vborcht", and another is documented as signed "Peeter van der Borcht van Brussel in Ausborch. 1615". A Forest landscape formerly in the Castle Rájec nad Svitavou, Czech Republic where it was attributed to Hendrik van der Borcht the elder, was re-attributed to Pieter van der Borcht (III) by art historian Marijke C. de Kinkelder in 2001.
