= Lucas Achtschellinck =

Flemish painter

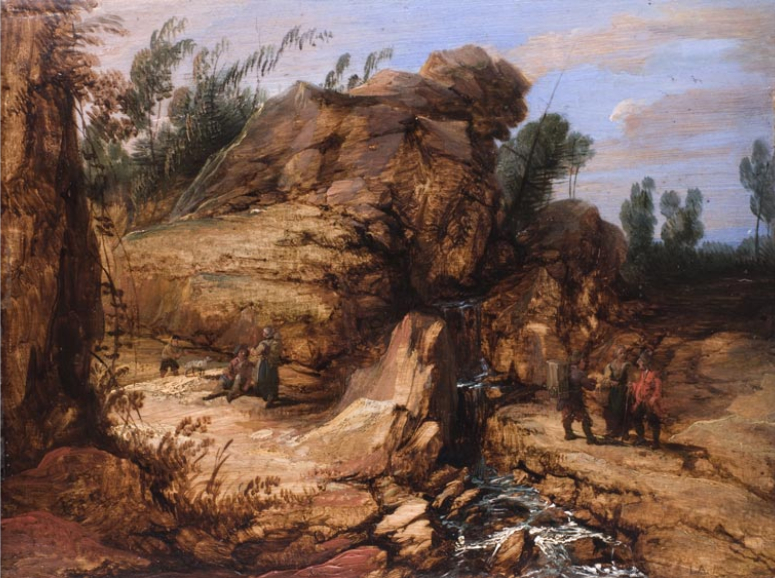
Rocky landscape with staffage figures

Lucas Achtschellinck (baptized 16 January 1626 – buried 12 May 1699) was a Flemish landscape painter. He is counted among the landscape painters active in Brussels referred to as the School of Painters of the Sonian Forest who all shared an interest in depicting scenes set in the Sonian Forest, which is located near Brussels.

== Life ==
He was born in Brussels and was possibly the grandson of the landscape painter Lukas Achtschelling. He was registered in the Brussels Guild of Saint Luke on 26 October 1639 as a pupil of a Pieter van der Borcht. The 17th century Flemish biographer Cornelis de Bie mentioned that Lucas Achtschellinck also studied with the Brussels landscapist Lodewijk de Vadder but this is not confirmed by Guild records. However, stylistically the two artists are quite close.

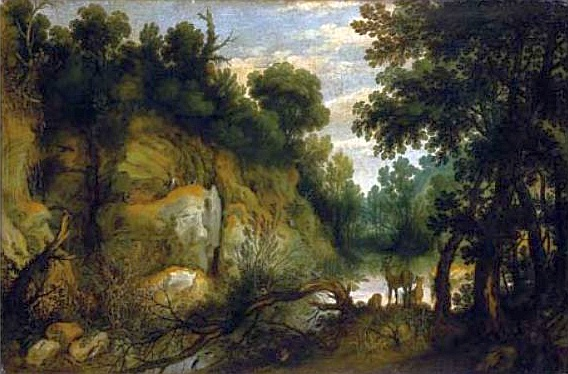
Riverscene with animals

Achtschellinck likely travelled abroad after completing his apprenticeship since he only became a master in the Brussels guild in 1657. On 13 March 1674 he married Anna Parys. He remained active in Brussels and in 1687 he was the deacon of the Brussels guild. He was successfully and employed 8 pupils including Théobald Michau between 1659 and 1686.

He died in Brussels.

== Work ==
No signed or documented works of Achtschellinck are known, although some monogrammed works are known such as a landscape in the Fondation Custodia and a few works sold at auction. A monogrammed and dated Extensive landscape with figures was at Sotheby's on 24 April 2008, lot 37. These monogrammed works are typically of a small size. There is still some uncertainty about whether Achterschellinck painted larger format works.

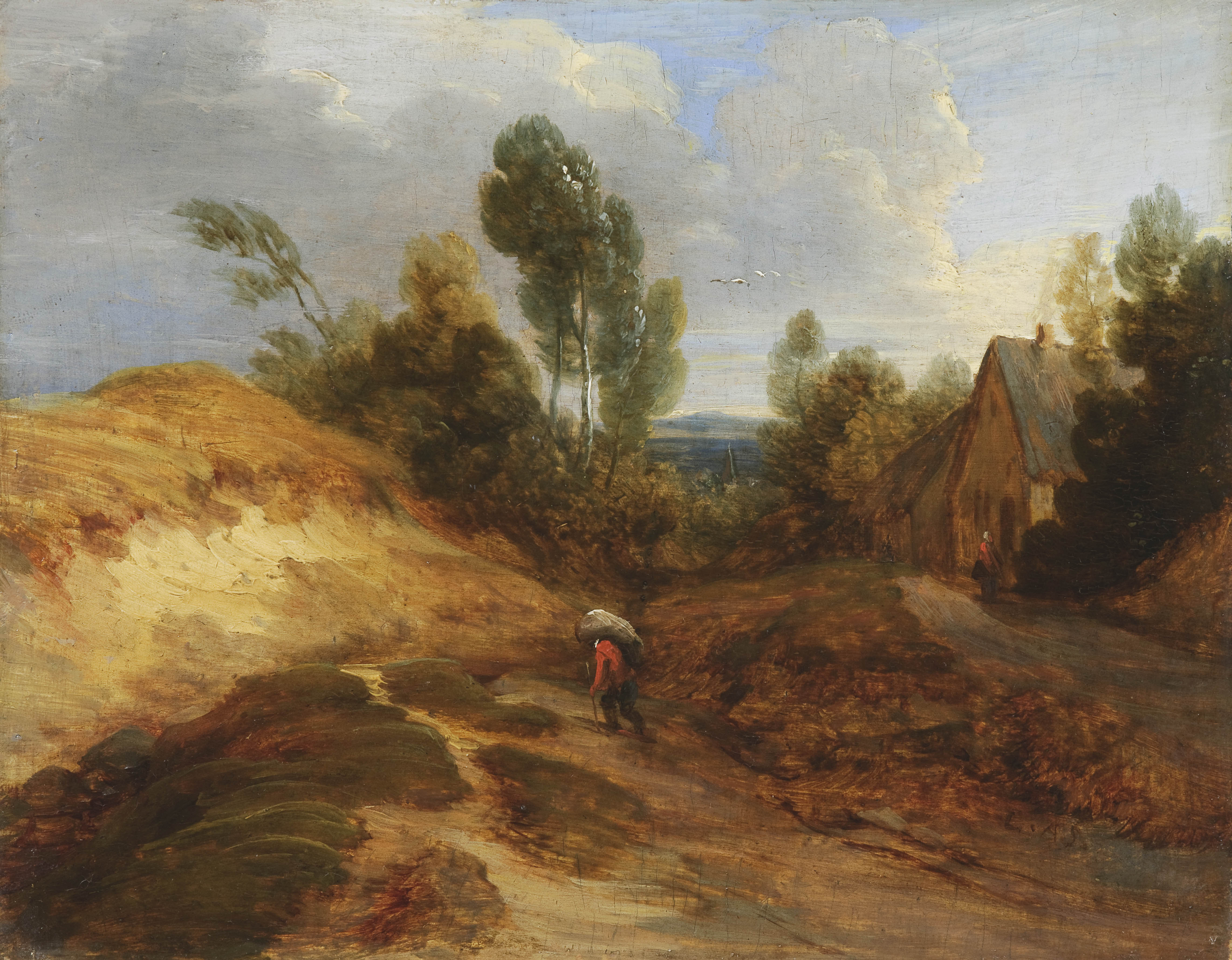
Dune landscape

Some large non-marked works (such as the works in the Groeningemuseum, Bruges) have been attributed to the artist. A scholar has reported seeing a photograph of a signed example in a private collection, but this has not resolved conclusively the issue of the attributions of such large-scale works. These large format works are very close to works by Lodewijk de Vadder and Jacques d'Arthois and may therefore now be in collections where they have been attributed to these other artists.

There are a number of landscapes with a clear stylistic relationship that are attributed to the artist. Characteristic features of his style are the broad brush stroke, especially in the depiction of roads, verges and trees. Similarly, the subtle silvery gradation of light and shade on tree trunks, and especially birches, is a recurring characteristic in the style of landscapes attributed to Achtschellinck.

Achtschellinck was a follower of Rubens' style of landscape painting and was also influenced by Jacques d'Arthois. He painted large wooded sceneries for churches and cloisters, which were then garnished by others with biblical characters and events. Achtschellinck painted the landscapes in many of the works of the Antwerp painter Gaspar de Crayer (1582–1669).

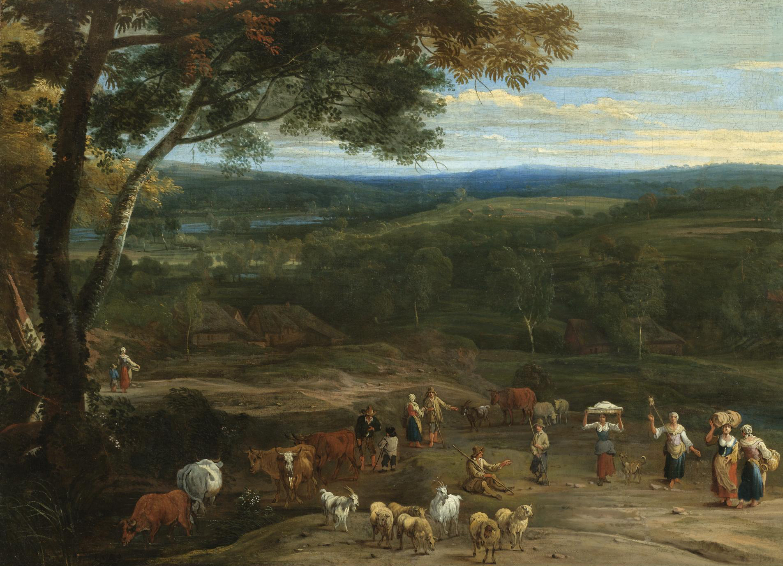
Extensive landscape with figures

Lucas Achtschellinck was among the leading Brussels landscape artists of his time. His presumed second teacher Lodewijk de Vadder (1605–1655) and Jacques d'Arthois (1603–1686) were other prominent Brussels landscape artists. Lucas Achtschellinck is seen as part of the group of landscape painters active in Brussels which also included Lodewijk de Vadder, Jacques d'Arthois, Philip van Dapels and Cornelis Huysmans who often depicted the woods and sand banks in the Sonian Forest near Brussels. They are for this reason referred to as the School of Painters of the Sonian Forest.

Lucas Achtschellinck also produced cartoons for the Brussels tapestry workshops. Together with Pieter Bout, Victor Honoré Janssens, Peter Ykens and Lodewijk van Schoor, he designed models for large tapestry series including six models each for the series Dido and Aeneas, Perseus and Andromeda and for Teniers tapestries.
