= Théobald Michau =

Théobald Michau (1676–1765) was a conservative Walloon painter of landscapes, more famous in his own time than he is today.

Michau was born in Tournai and was a pupil of Lucas Achtschellinck.

Subjects of the country festivals (Kermesse) that were popularized by David Teniers, father and son to the extent that paintings and tapestries showing such rustic themes were called Ténières. Michau painted designs and perhaps provided full-scale cartoons for tapestry weavers, for surviving records of the Brussels tapestry workshop of Pieter van der Borcht record Teniers peints par le fameux Sr Michau, such Teniers-like subjects painted by "the famous Sieur Michau".

Among his work, on wooden or copper panels, in public collections are the Summer and Winter landscapes in Vienna.

Also he was a teacher and died in Antwerp. Among his pupils was Martin J. Geeraerts, who specialised in painted bas-reliefs en camaïeu.

== Gallery ==
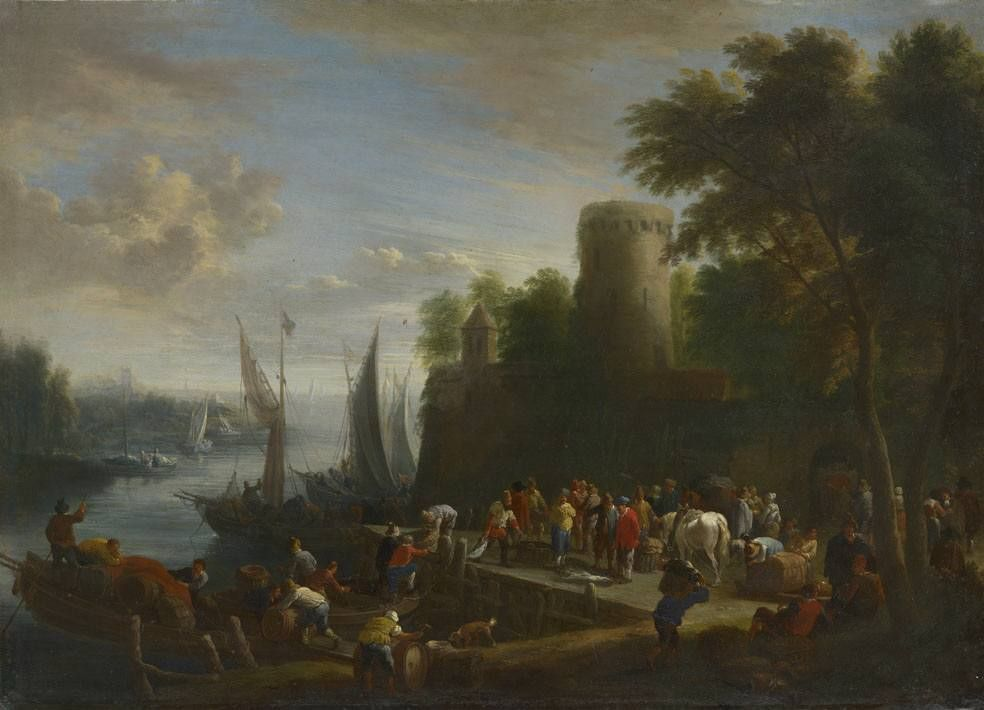
Estuary with dock and tower

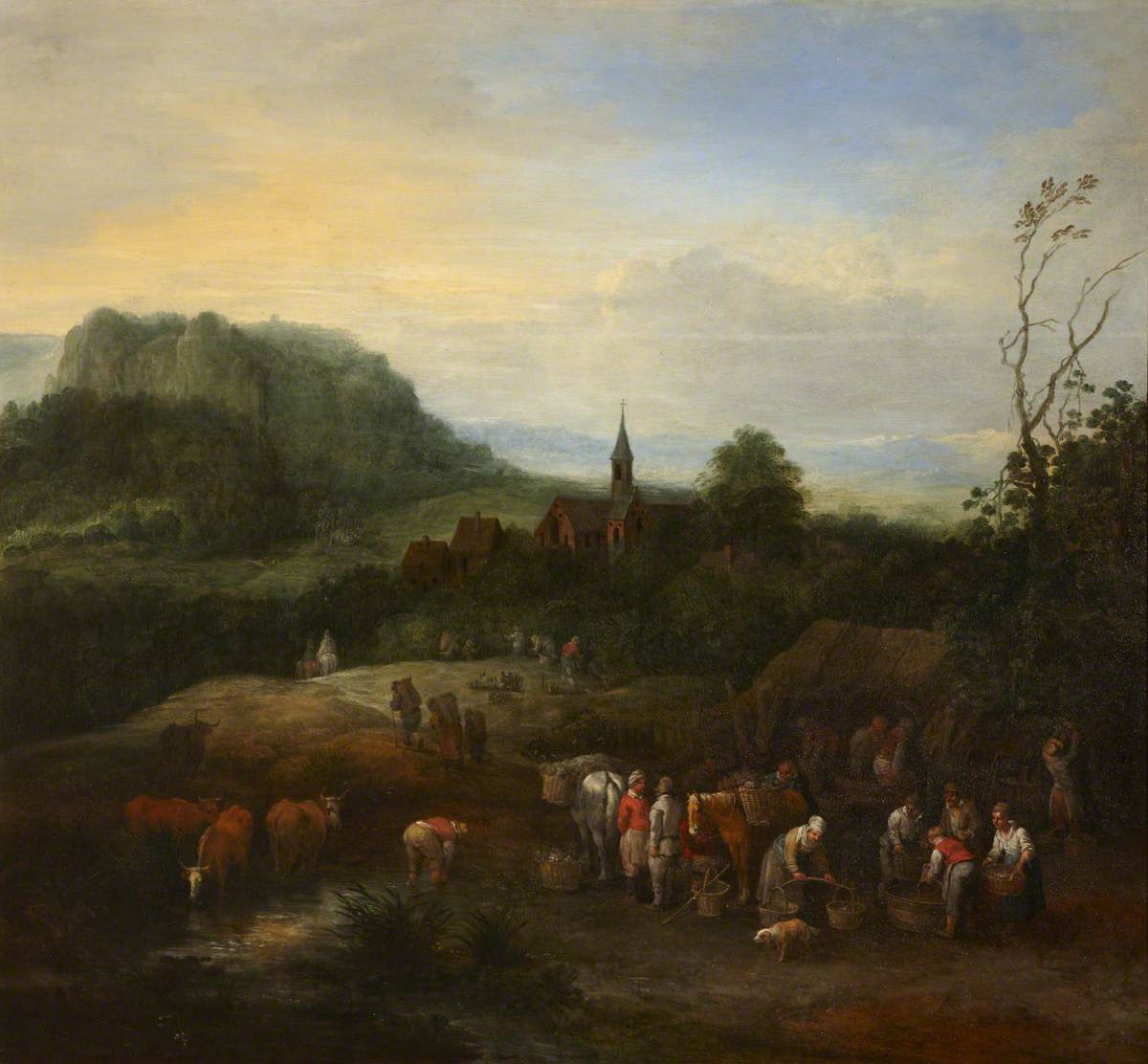
The Four Seasons, Autumn

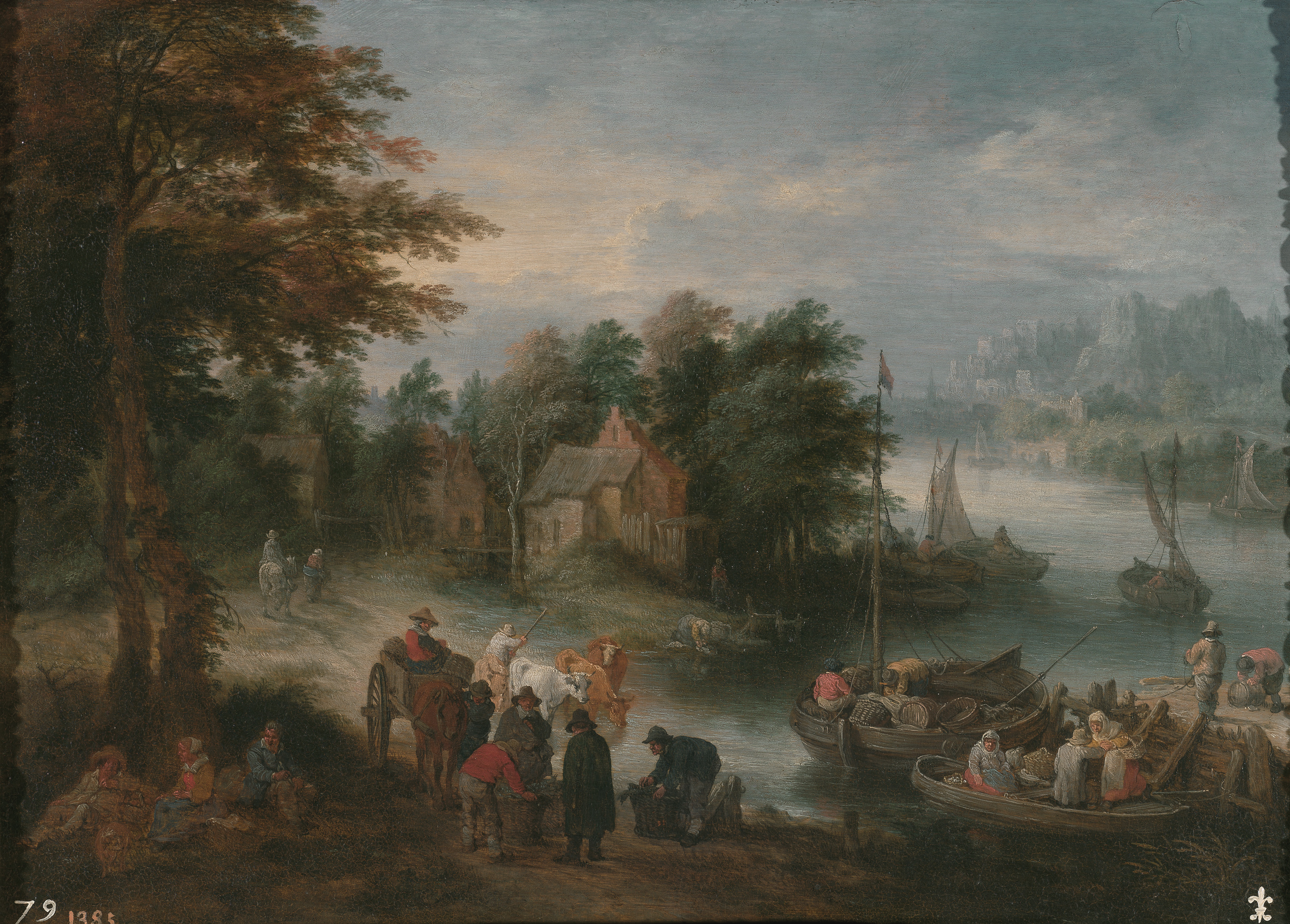
River with people and cattle

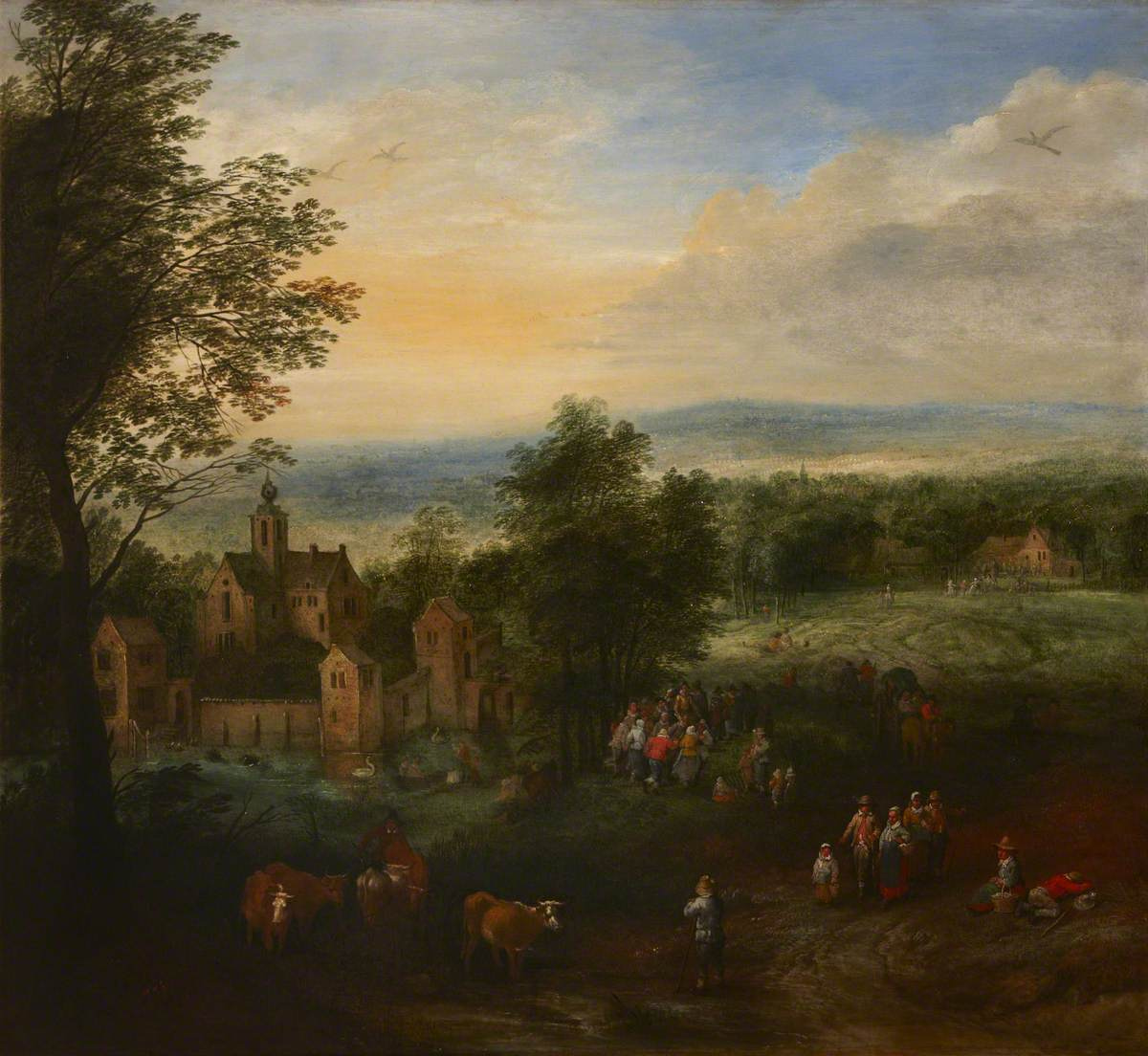
The Four Seasons, Spring

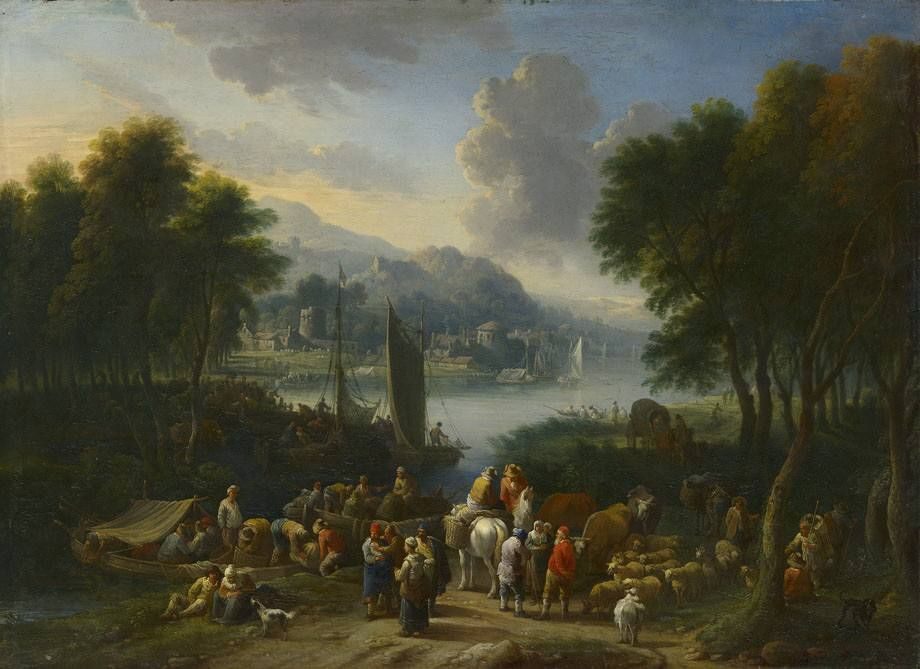
Landscape on a river
