= Huysmans =

Huysmans or Huijsmans is a Dutch occupational surname. A "huisman" or "huijsman" is an archaic term for a farmer. Notable people with the surname include:

- Camille Huysmans (1871–1968), Belgian politician
- Constant Huysmans (1928–2016), Belgian footballer
- Constant Cornelis Huijsmans (1810–1886), Dutch painter
- Cornelis Huysmans (1648–1727), Flemish painter, brother of Jan Baptist Huysmans
- Gerardus Huysmans (1902–1948), Dutch Minister for Finance (1945) and Economy (1946–1948)
- Jacob Huysmans (c. 1633–1696), Flemish portrait painter
- Jan Baptist Huysmans (1654–1716), a Flemish painter, brother of Cornelis Huysmans
- Jan-Baptist Huysmans (1826–1906), Belgian Orientalist painter and travel writer
- Joris-Karl Huysmans (1848–1907), French novelist
- Jos Huysmans (1941–2012), Belgian cyclist

Huijsman/Huysman:

- Harald Huysman (born 1959), Norwegian race car driver
- Jérémy Huysman (born 1988), French footballer
- Nicolas Huysman (born 1968), French footballer

== See also ==
- Huisman
