= Philip van Dapels =

Flemish painter (born 1640)

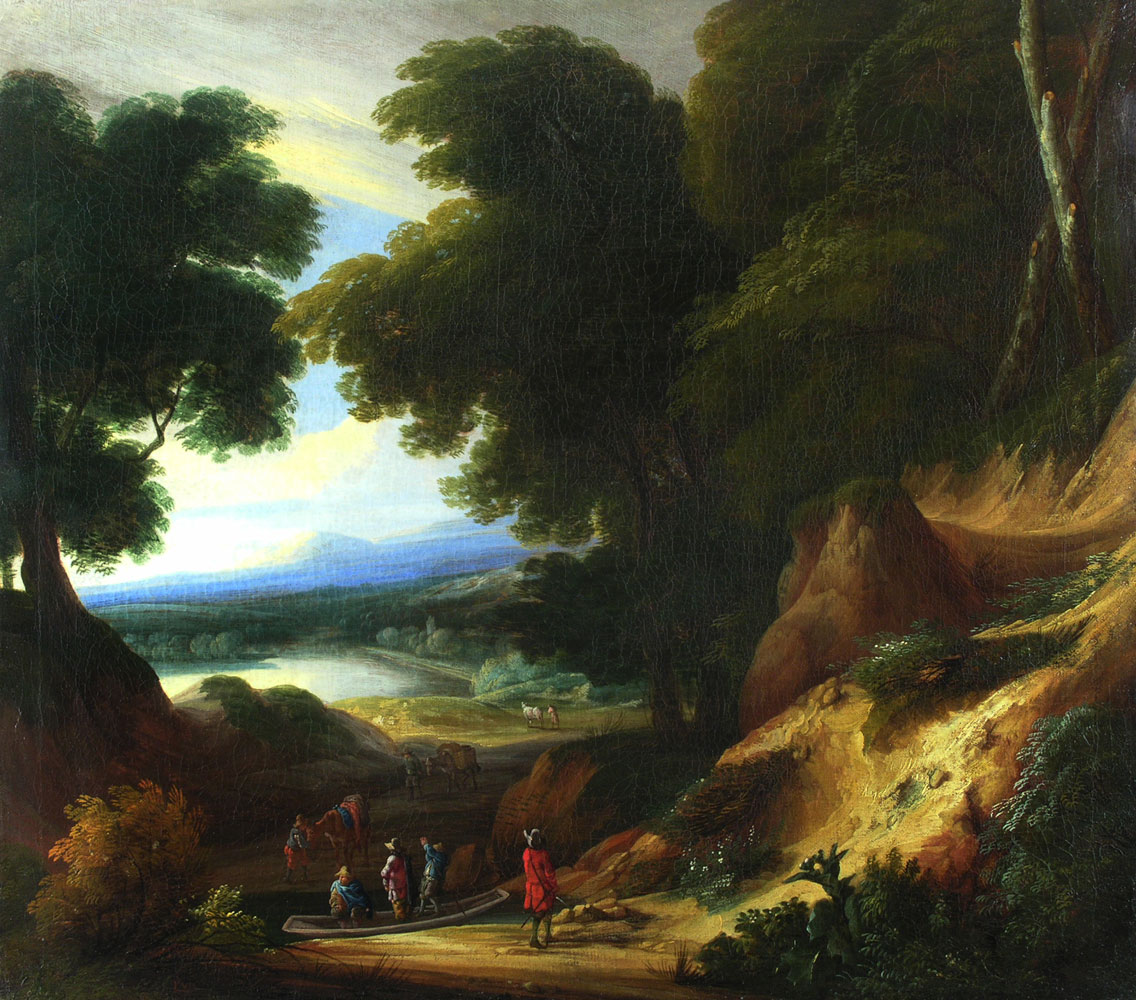
Forest landscape with figures

Philip van Dapels or Philippe van Dapels (c. 1640 – after 1669) was a Flemish painter who specialized in wooded landscapes with figures. He is known for depicting the landscapes around Brussels. Philip van Dapels' style and subject matter are close to those of his master Jacques d'Arthois and Cornelis Huysmans, two artists who like van Dapels often depicted wooded landscapes and the scenery around Brussels.

== Life ==
Little is known about the life of Philip van Dapels. He is assumed to have been born some time between 1635 and 1645. He is first recorded in 1654 in the books of the Brussels Guild of St. Luke as a pupil of Jacques d'Arthois. The record also notes that van Dapels was a citizen of Brussels. The last firm information about the artist is another record in the books of the Brussels Guild of St. Luke dated 1669 which lists him on becoming a master of the Guild. This last record also notes that he was the son of Pieter.

The artist is believed to have died between 1669 and 1689.

== Work ==
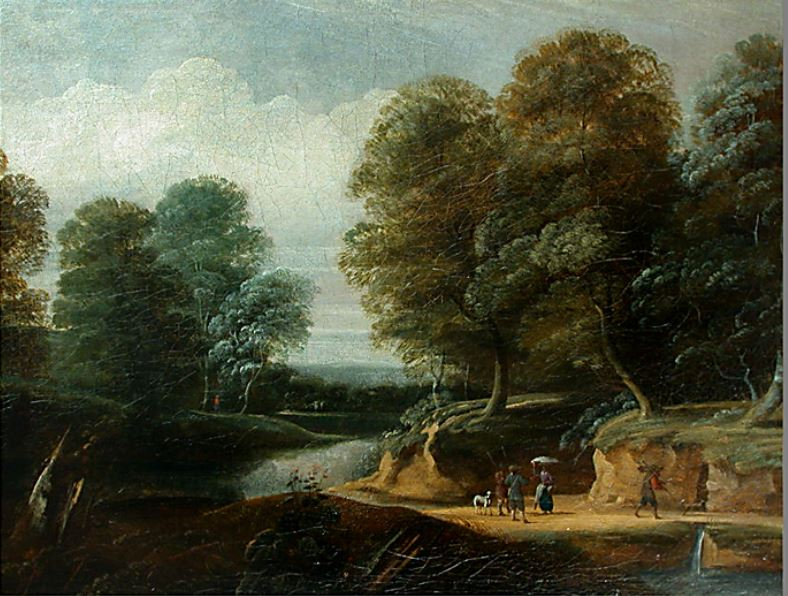
River landscape with hikers and people gathering brushwood

Philip van Dapels was a landscape painter who specialized in wooded landscapes with figures. He has only been rediscovered not so long ago and very few works have been attributed to him. These include two works with the monogram 'PVD' in private collections. Two more works, recently in auctions, have also been attributed to the artist.

His works are close to those of Cornelis Huysmans, although they are more quiet and posed. His themes are those already covered by the masters of the Brussels school of landscape painting (also referred to as the School of Painters of the Sonian Forest). This school included painters like Lodewijk de Vadder, Jacques d'Arthois and Lucas Achtschellinck who often depicted the woods and sand banks in the Sonian Forest near Brussels. Van Dapels' style is distinguished by a rather mechanical touch in his depiction of foliage and a palette limited to browns and greens. Van Dapels and Cornelis Huysmans, as well as Cornelis' brother Jan Baptist Huysmans form the last generation of the School of Painters of the Sonian Forest.
