= Huisman =

Huisman is an occupational surname of Dutch origin. "Huisman" translates to houseman, and is an archaic term for a farmer who owns his farm. Common variations are Huismann, Huismans, Huijsman, Huijsmans, Huysman, and Huysmans. Notable people with this surname include:

- Daan Huisman (born 2002), Dutch footballer
- Dave Huismans, a.k.a. 2562 (born 1979), Dutch musician
- Duncan Huisman (born 1971), Dutch race car driver
- Emma Huismans (born 1947), Dutch-born Afrikaans writer, journalist, and activist
- Georges Huisman (1889–1957), French politician and founder of the Cannes Film Festival
- Hellen Huisman (1937–2012), Dutch voice actor
- Henny Huisman (born 1951), Dutch television presenter
- Jef Depassé Huisman (1943–2021), Dutch sculptor
- Johannes Alphonsus Huisman (1919–2003), Dutch philologist
- Jopie Huisman (1922–2000), Dutch painter
- Josje Huisman (born 1986), Dutch singer and dancer
- Justin Huisman (born 1979), American baseball pitcher
- Kai Huisman (born 1995), Dutch footballer
- Margriet Huisman (born 1983), Dutch squash player
- Marieke Huisman (born 1973), Dutch computer scientist
- Mariska Huisman (born 1983), Dutch speedskater
- Mark Huismann (born 1958), American baseball player
- Maurice Huisman (1912–1993), Belgian Opera director
- Michiel Huisman (born 1981), Dutch film and television actor
- Patrick Huisman (born 1966), Dutch race car driver
- Rick Huisman (born 1969), American baseball player
- Robin Huisman de Jong (born 1988), Dutch footballer
- Roelof Huisman (1443–1485), Dutch humanist scholar better known as Rodolphus Agricola
- Sjoerd Huisman (1986–2013), Dutch speed skater
- Violaine Huisman (born 1979), French writer
- Wilfried Huismann (born 1951), German journalist and film maker
- Christopher W Huisman (born 1971), toy designer

== See also ==
- Huysmans
- De Huisman, a windmill at the Zaanse Schans
- Royal Huisman, Dutch sailing yachts shipyard named after its founder, Jan Huisman
