= Jacob Huysmans =

Flemish portrait painter (c. 1633–1696)

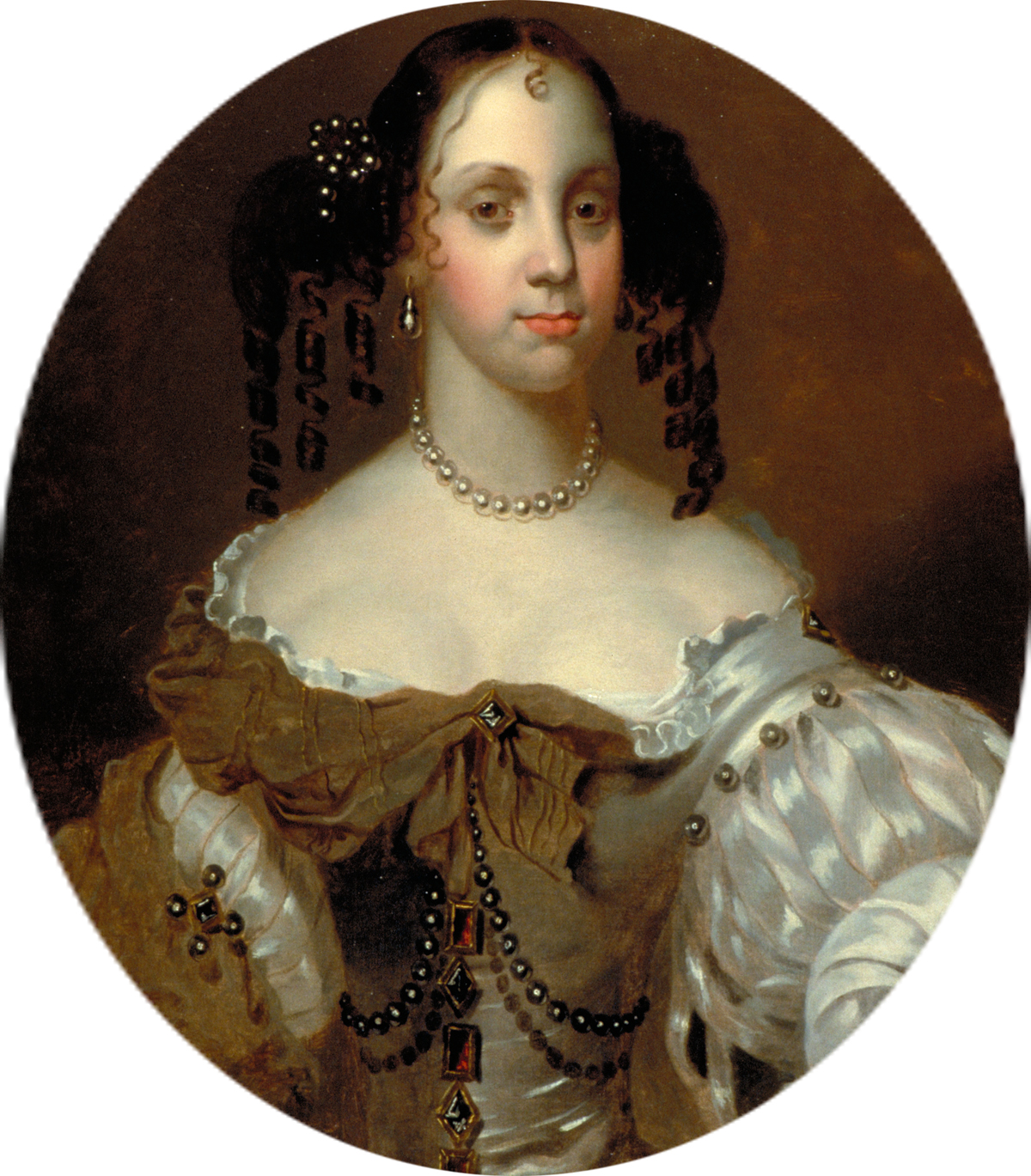
Portrait of Queen Catharine

Jacob Huysmans (c. 1633–1696) was a Flemish portrait painter who, after training in his native Antwerp, immigrated to England before the Restoration. He became a feted court painter and attracted the patronage of the Portuguese born queen Catherine of Braganza, a Catholic like himself, of whom he painted several portraits. With his exuberant style, he was during his lifetime regarded as an important rival of the court painter Peter Lely who favored a more sober treatment of his sitters.

== Life ==
He is believed to have been born in Antwerp. A number of his family members also became artists: he was the uncle of Cornelis and Jan Baptist Huysmans, both landscape painters. Huysmans trained in Antwerp and was a pupil of the history painters Gillis Backereel and Frans Wouters.

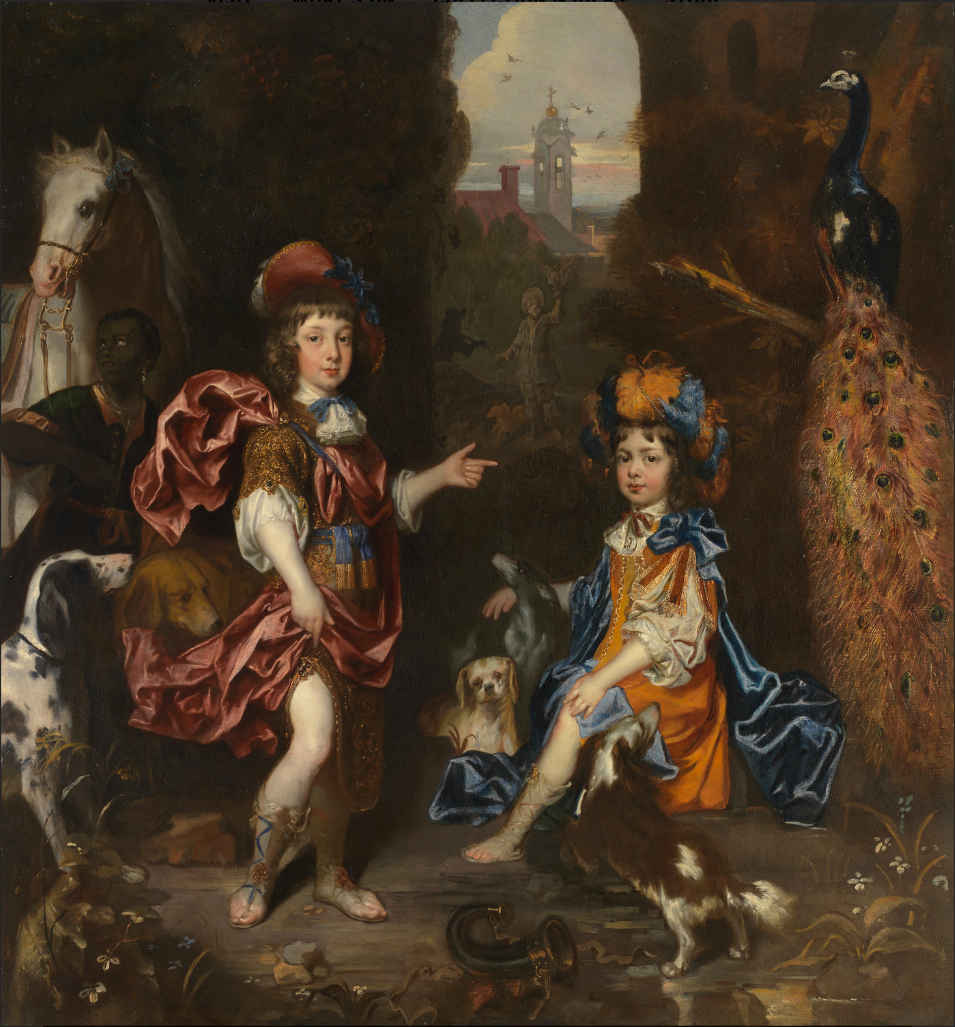
Edward Henry Lee, 1st Earl of Lichfield, and his wife Charlotte Fitzroy as children

Huysmans moved to England, according to some sources before the Restoration in 1660. He is first recorded in England in 1662. Here he first started out as a painter of pastiches in a reduced format of history paintings by Anthony van Dyck. He subsequently was able to establish himself as a portrait painter at the court of Charles II. As a Roman Catholic he was in particular favoured by the Queen Catharine of Braganza, a Catholic from Portugal. The famous diarist Samuel Pepys visited the workshop of Huysman (to whom he referred as 'Hiseman') in Westminster on 26 August 1664 and described Huysmans as a 'picture-drawer ... which is said to exceed Lilly (Lely), and indeed there is both of the Queenes and Mayds of Honour (particularly Mrs. Stewart's in a buff doublet like a soldier) as good pictures, I think, as ever I saw.' Queen Catharine as a Shepherdess (c. 1664, British Royal Collection) and the Queen as St Catherine of Alexandria (of which there are various versions) were among the pictures Pepys saw on that occasion.

While he spent the majority of his career in London, Huysmans resided for a while in Chichester in Sussex following the Great Fire of London. This may have been to escape the threat of anti-Catholic retaliation prevalent in London at this time. Allegations that Catholics had started the fire were exploited as powerful political propaganda by opponents of pro-Catholic Charles II's court, mostly during the Popish Plot and the exclusion crisis later in Charles' reign.

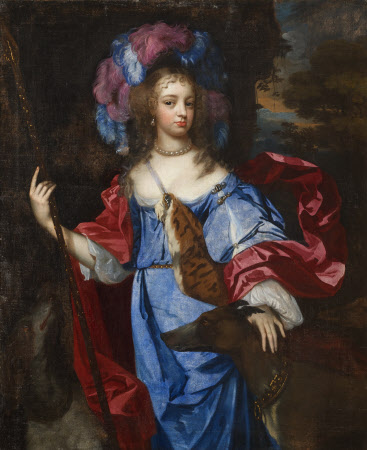
Elizabeth Cornwallis, Mrs Edward Allen (d. 1708), as Diana the Huntress

Huysmans died in Jermyn Street, London, in 1696, and was buried in St. James's Church in Piccadilly, a church for which he had painted an altarpiece in the chapel of the Queen.

== Work ==
=== General ===
Jacob Huysmans was principally a portrait painter. Upon his arrival in England he did, however, rely on his skills as a history painter creating small pastiches of religious and mythological scenes by Anthony van Dyck. Even after having established himself as a portrait painter to the elite, he still painted history subjects and is known to have created religious compositions for his patron Queen Catherine of Braganza. His religious and historical paintings are more sober in style than his portraits.

Huysmans influenced David des Granges (1611–1675).

Huysmans' style has been described as exuberant, a quality that made it particularly appealing to the Portuguese-born Queen Catherine. His style and handling of paint and application of colour are close to the Italianate Baroque style of Anthony van Dyck. His palette is characterized by the use of high-keyed colours, reddish lights in the flesh tones, and a smooth, glossy finish. Huysmans was particularly skilled in rendering the rich colours and textures of sumptuous clothes worn at the court. He liked showing the interplay of light, colour and contrasting textures, crumpled satin against porcelain skin or glossy ringlets interwoven with jewel-like flowers. Huysmans had a preference for depicting his sitters in costume and with props placed in theatrical settings and including allegorical symbols. The grandeur he bestowed on his sitters evokes the work of the Italian painter Guido Reni and the 17th-century Bolognese school.

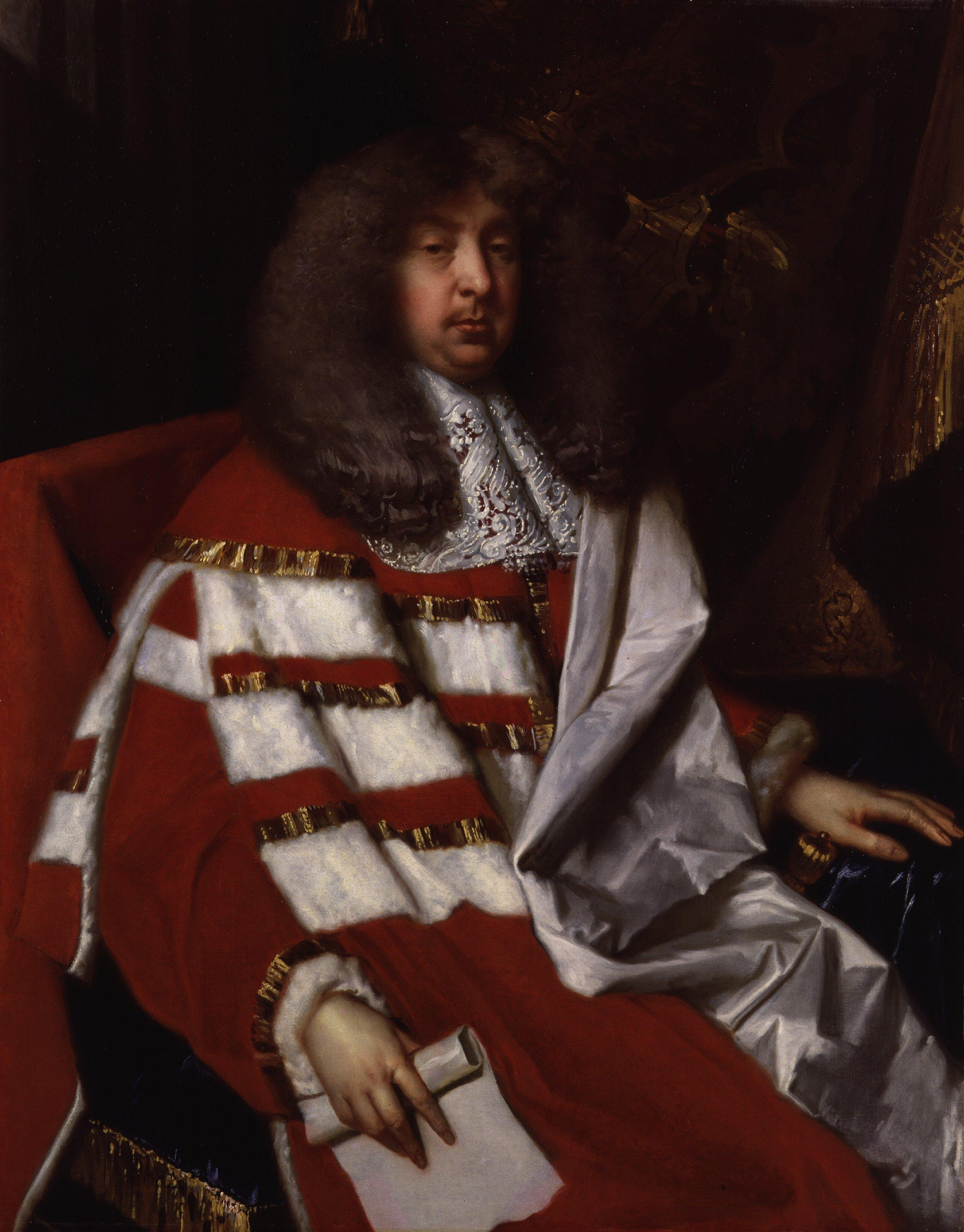
John Maitland, Duke of Lauderdale

Huysmans painted many of his female sitters as shepherdesses with clothing embellished with embroidery and jewellery. He also often depicted female sitters as religious or classical figures. Three renderings of ladies in the role of the Roman goddess Diana by his hand are known: the Lady Elizabeth Pope as Diana (Canons Ashby, Northamptonshire), Elizabeth Cornwallis, Mrs Edward Allen, as Diana the Huntress (National Trust, Hatchlands) and Portrait of an unknown lady as Diana (Tate Britain). These portraits follow a standard format depicting Diana with a hunting spear, together with a few hounds from her hunting pack and sharply delineated drapery. The presentation was aimed to highlight the beauty, purity and chastity of the sitter. The pose of the goddess as well as the greyhounds with star studded collar are likely references to the Virgin Mary who in popular Catholic images of the Immaculate Conception was often depicted with a crown of stars.

In a similar pastoral vein are situated some portraits of children by Huysmans. Examples are the Family portrait of three aristocratic children with a sheep decorated with a floral wreath and a dog (At Dorotheum Vienna on 19 April 2016 lot 258) and the Portrait of Edward Henry Lee, 1st Earl of Lichfield, and his wife Charlotte Fitzroy as children (National Gallery of Victoria). The latter work depicts Edward Henry Lee (1663–1716), a Catholic and Charlotte Fitzroy, the illegitimate and preferred daughter of Charles II and his mistress Barbara Villiers. The two had become betrothed as children and Huysmans' painting shows the pair as children. The painting contains hidden allusions to the Catholic faith, which was illegal at the time despite Charles II's religious tolerance. The peacock symbolizes the resurrection of Christ and Christ as a gardener.

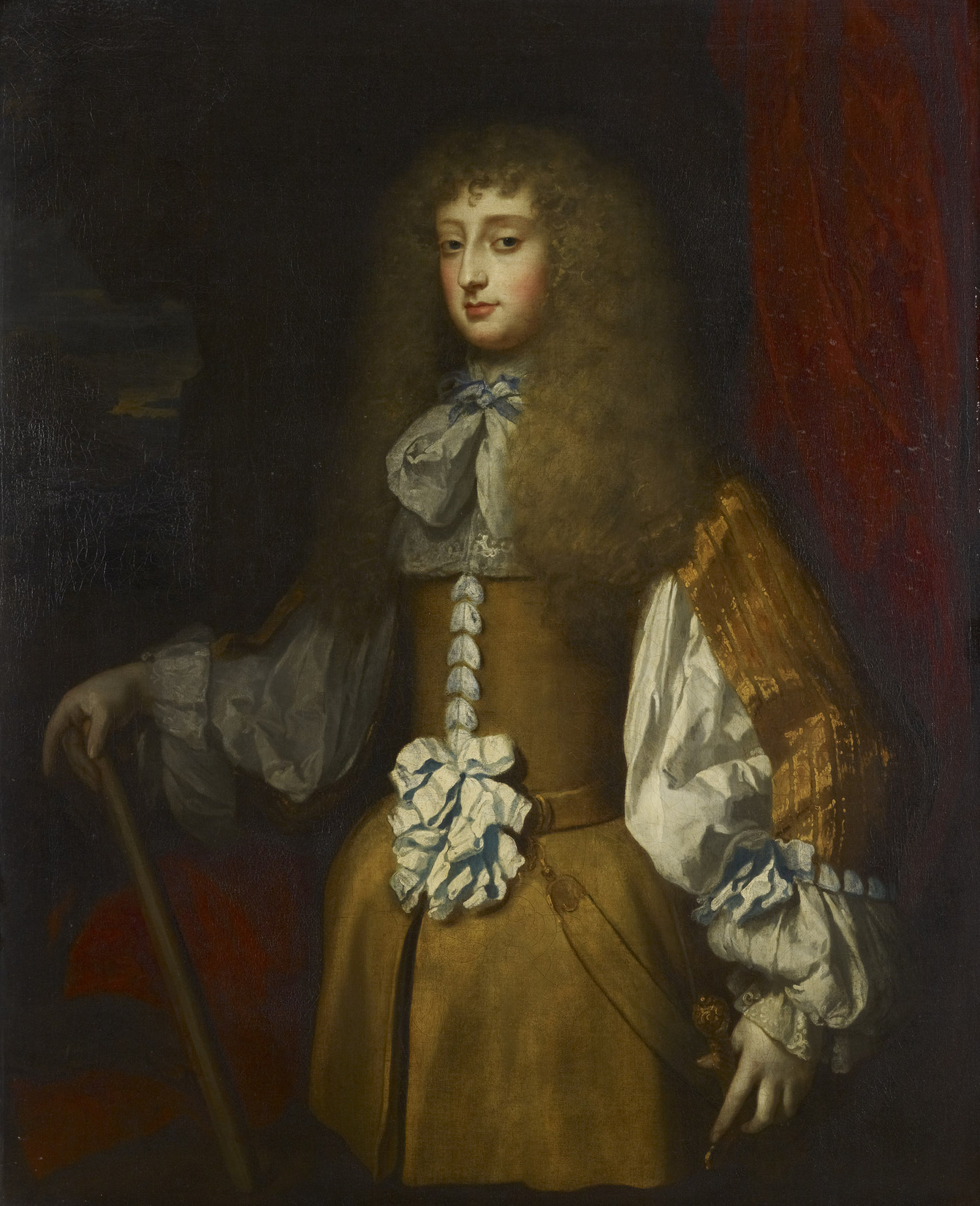
Frances Stewart, later Duchess of Richmond

=== Portraits of the Queen ===
One of the most important patrons of Huysmans was Queen Catherine of whom he painted many portraits. In 1683, Catherine also commissioned an opulent altarpiece and cupola for her Chapel in St James's Palace in London. The quantity of portraits Huysmans painted of the Queen and her maids of honour suggest that he was her principal painter. Possibly the Queen favored Huysmans to distance herself from her husband's mistress Barbara Villiers, who patronized Lely.

His portrait of Queen Catharine as a Shepherdess (c. 1664, British Royal Collection) is one of his most famous paintings, and is the one which Pepys saw in his studio and had caused him to praise Huysmans abundantly. Catherine is depicted in the guise of a shepherdess, sitting by a stream. A sprig of orange blossom in her hair symbolizes love, marriage and fruitfulness. Her left hand rests on the head of a lamb, possibly a symbol of the virtues of innocence, purity and humility. A Cupid is bringing her flowers in a large handkerchief. Other small cupids play among the trees in the background.

Another portrait of the Queen seen by Pepys in Huysmans' studio was a depiction of the Queen as Saint Catherine of Alexandria of which various versions exist of which one in the Royal Collection of the United Kingdom. The Queen is portrayed as St. Catherine of Alexandria, with a martyr's palm in her right hand and her left resting upon the broken wheel on which the Catholic saint was martyred. The Queen was born on the feast of St. Catherine and being painted as the saint became a fashionable way for female courtiers to demonstrate respect to the new Queen.

=== Portrait of John Wilmot, 2nd Earl of Rochester ===
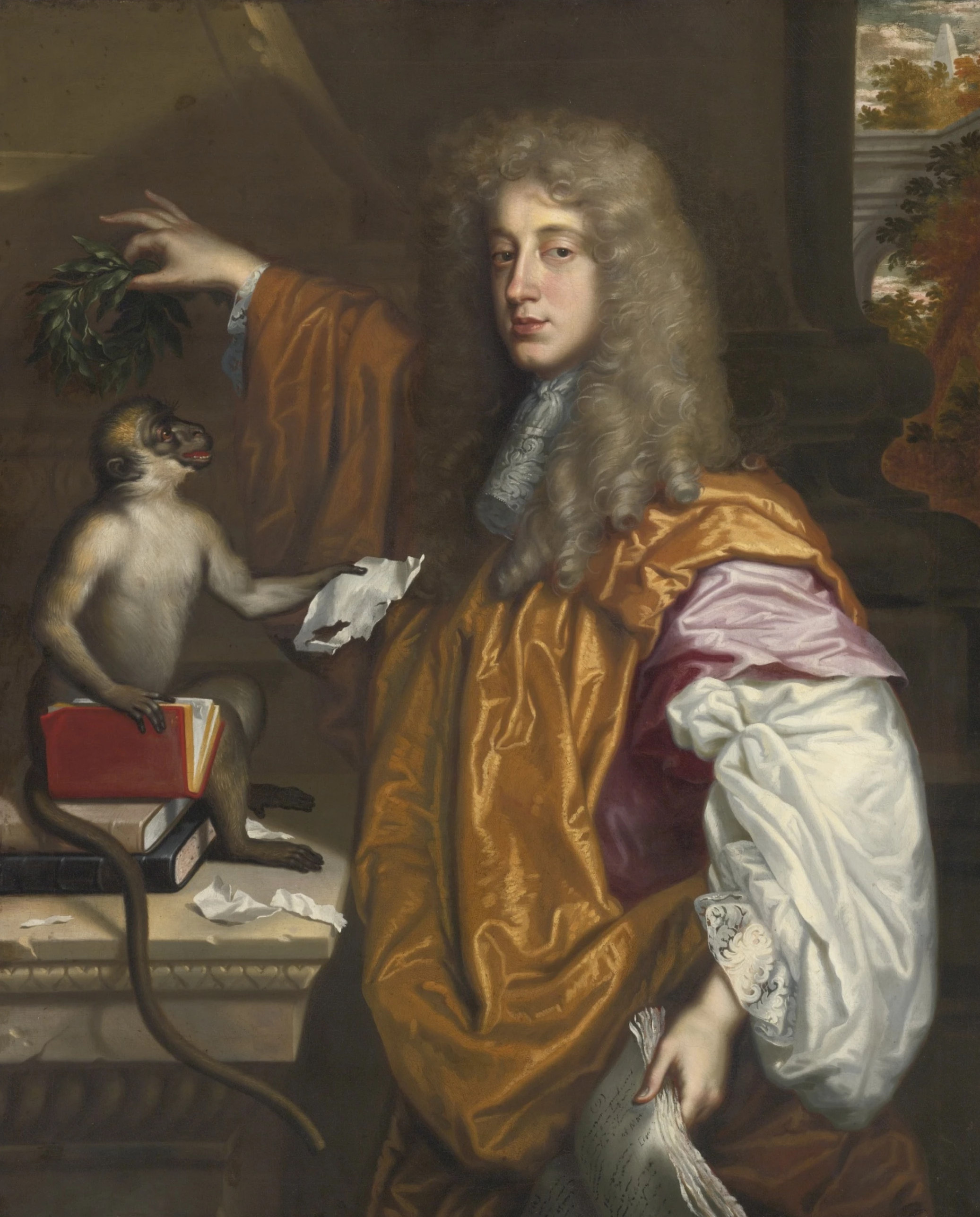
Portrait of John Wilmot, 2nd Earl of Rochester

Another well-known painting by Huysmans is the Portrait of John Wilmot, 2nd Earl of Rochester, the famous rake, poet and courtier at King Charles II's court (The original auctioned at Sotheby's London on 9 July 2014 lot 42, a copy in the National Portrait Gallery, London). The composition was likely painted not long before Rochester's death. An important variation in the copy of the portrait in the National Portrait Gallery is the addition of red shoulder tabs to his costume which has the effect of 'normalizing' the image.

Rochester is believed to have contributed important elements to the design of the composition, in particular, the monkey. Rochester is known to have kept a pet monkey, which he allegedly trained to defecate on people and probably served as the model for the painting.

The composition portrays Rochester holding a manuscript in one hand and apparently bestowing the poet's laurels on a monkey with the other. The monkey has torn pages from a book which he is handing back to the poet. Monkeys feature prominently in Rochester's writing in which they serve as a symbol of the folly and presumption of man. The painting could therefore be read as a satirical and self-deprecating depiction of Rochester.

Other interpretations of the portrait have been offered. Some art historians have posited that it should be read as a satire on John Dryden, the English poet with whom Rochester had a tense relationship. In this interpretation, Rochester's right hand is seen as removing the laurel rather than bestowing it. When someone is crowned with a laurel it would normally be done using both hands not one hand. The monkey would represent John Dryden who is being 'de-laureled' by Rochester, a threat which Rochester had made in his Allusion to Horace.
