= Denis van Alsloot =

Flemish landscape painter (c. 1570–1626)

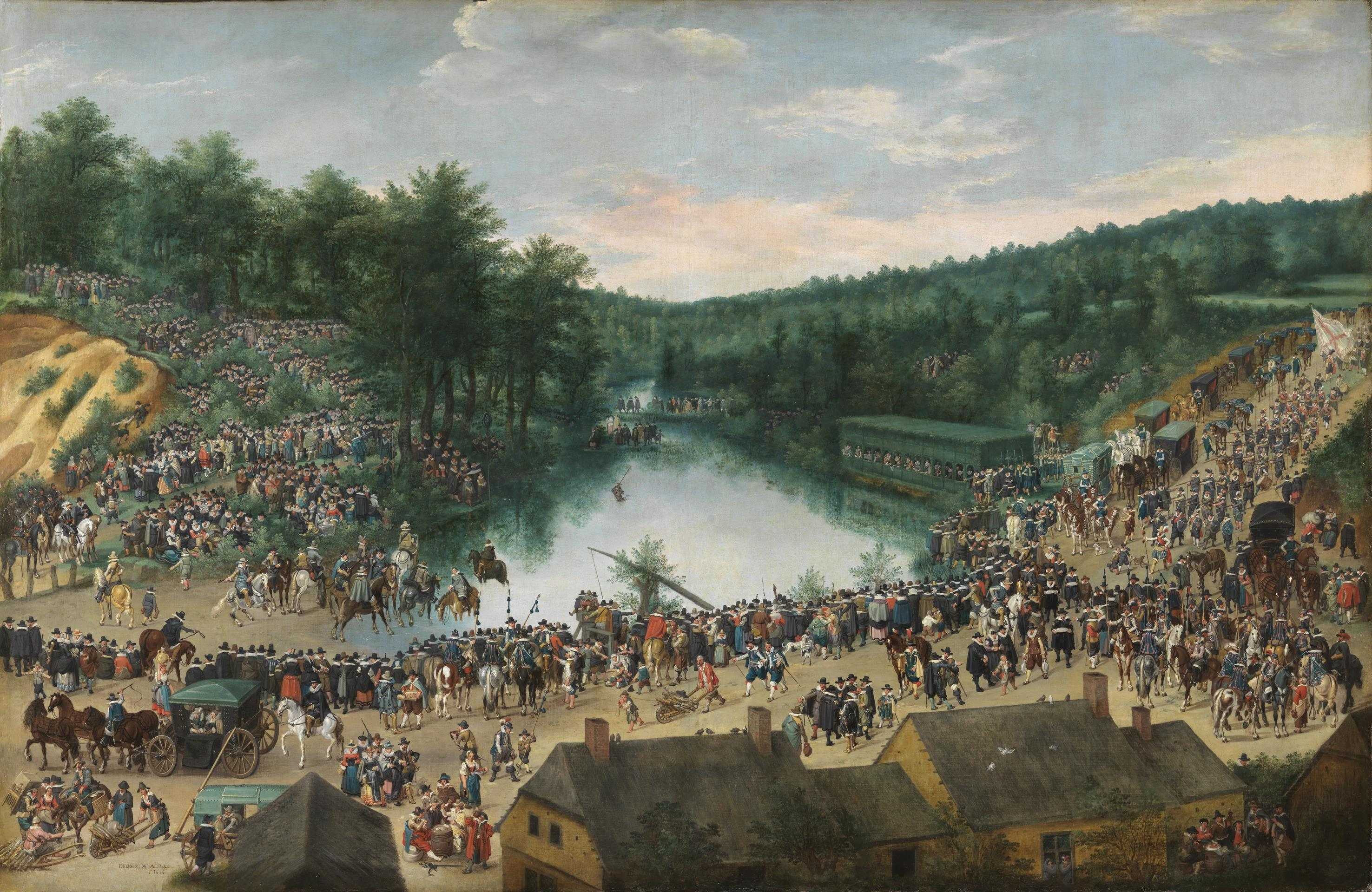
Feast of Our Lady of the Woods

Denis van Alsloot or Denijs van Alsloot (c. 1570 – c. 1626) was a Flemish landscape and genre painter, draughtsman, and tapestry designer. He was employed as a court painter and worked for the local elite in Brussels. He is considered to be a member of the Sonian Forest school of landscape painters, which included landscape painters such as Jacques d'Arthois and Cornelis Huysmans. These painters working in Brussels had a preference for depicting scenes from the Sonian Forest near Brussels. Van Alsloot was also a specialist in depicting civil processions, local festivals and ceremonies.

== Life ==
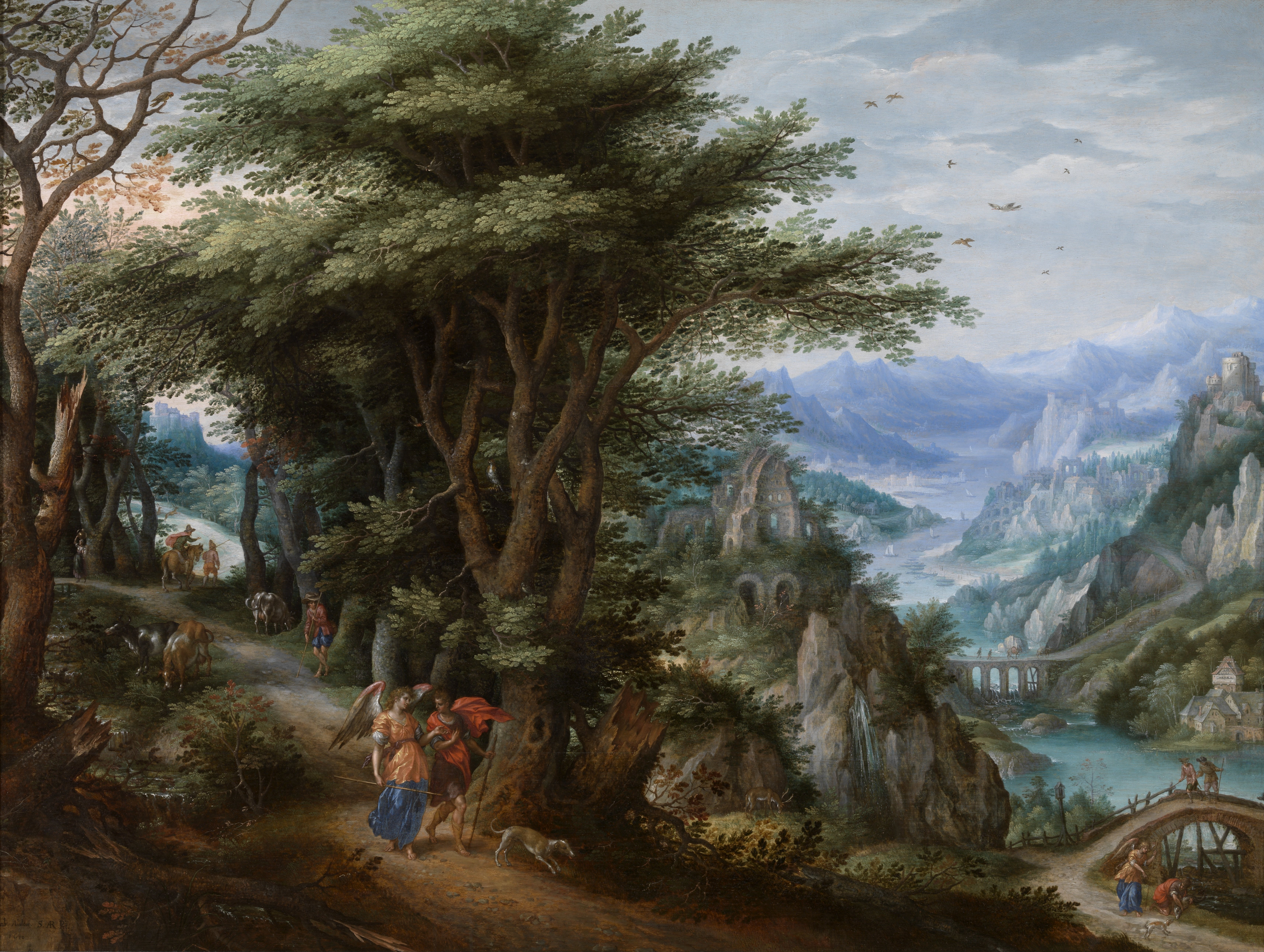
Landscape with Tobias and the angel, with Hendrick de Clerck

Van Alsloot was born in Mechelen or possibly Brussels. His father was a tapestry worker. It is not known who was his teacher. He is first recorded in official records when he joined the Brussels Guild of St Luke in 1599 as a tapestry designer. He also took his first pupil in 1599. He trained a further three apprentices between 1599 and 1625. Van Alsloot was exclusively working on the design of tapestries until 1606, the year in which he signed his first painting.

Alsloot's career started to take off from the early 17th century after he was appointed court painter to Albert and Isabella, the governors of the Spanish Netherlands. He became a painter to the elite and served a clientele of princes, courtesans and influential state officials.

He was still alive in 1626 as is testified by a painting dated in that year. He must have died in or before 1628 as two works he had left as inheritance to a niece were bought in 1628 by the Archduchess Isabella.

== Work ==
Van Alsloot started out in the same profession as his father as a designer of cartoons for the local tapestry works in Brussels. In 1603 he designed a series of tapestries of Grotesques for the Archdukes.

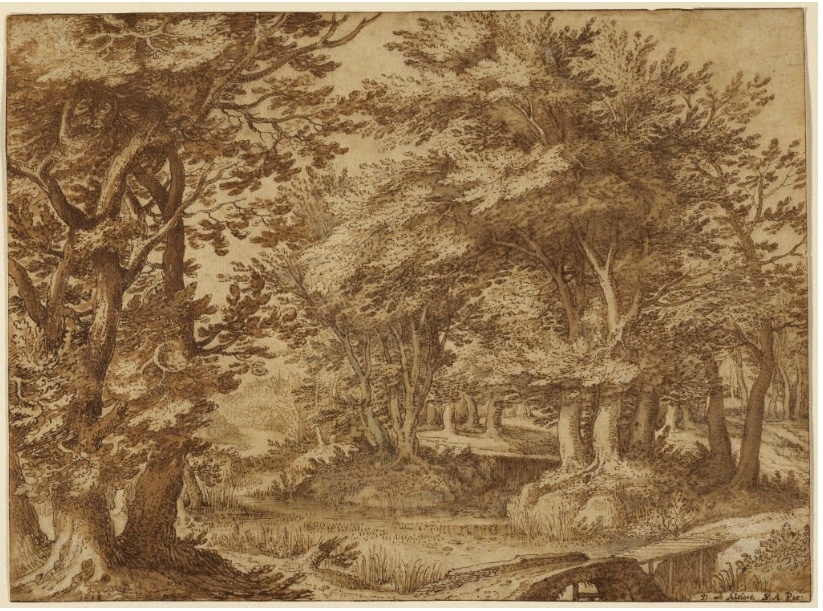
Forest landscape with a distant castle

His painting career seems to have started around 1606. He mainly painted landscapes and scenes of local festivals and ceremonies. His work can be regarded as transitory in the development of landscape art in the early 17th century. All his known dated works were made in Brussels between 1606 and 1626. He often signed his works with the addition of 'S.A.Pic.'. This is short for 'Serenissorum Archiducum Pictor', a reference to his official position as a court painter to Archduke Albert and Archduchess Isabella.

Van Alsloot painted topographically accurate as well as imaginary landscapes, including summer and winter landscapes. Like later landscape painters in Brussels such as Lucas Achtschellinck, Lodewijk de Vadder and Jacques d'Arthois, van Alsloot drew inspiration from the Sonian Forest near Brussels. His forested landscapes often incorporate views of castles and abbeys located in the Sonian Forest near Brussels. As van Alsloot's works are generally topographically accurate, it is possible to identify places that still survive, especially near the abbeys of Groenendael and Ter Kameren. His series of views of the abbeys in the Sonian Forest was presumably made on commission for the Archduke Albert. He painted several versions of the winter view of Groenendael, all with differences as well as a few summer views.

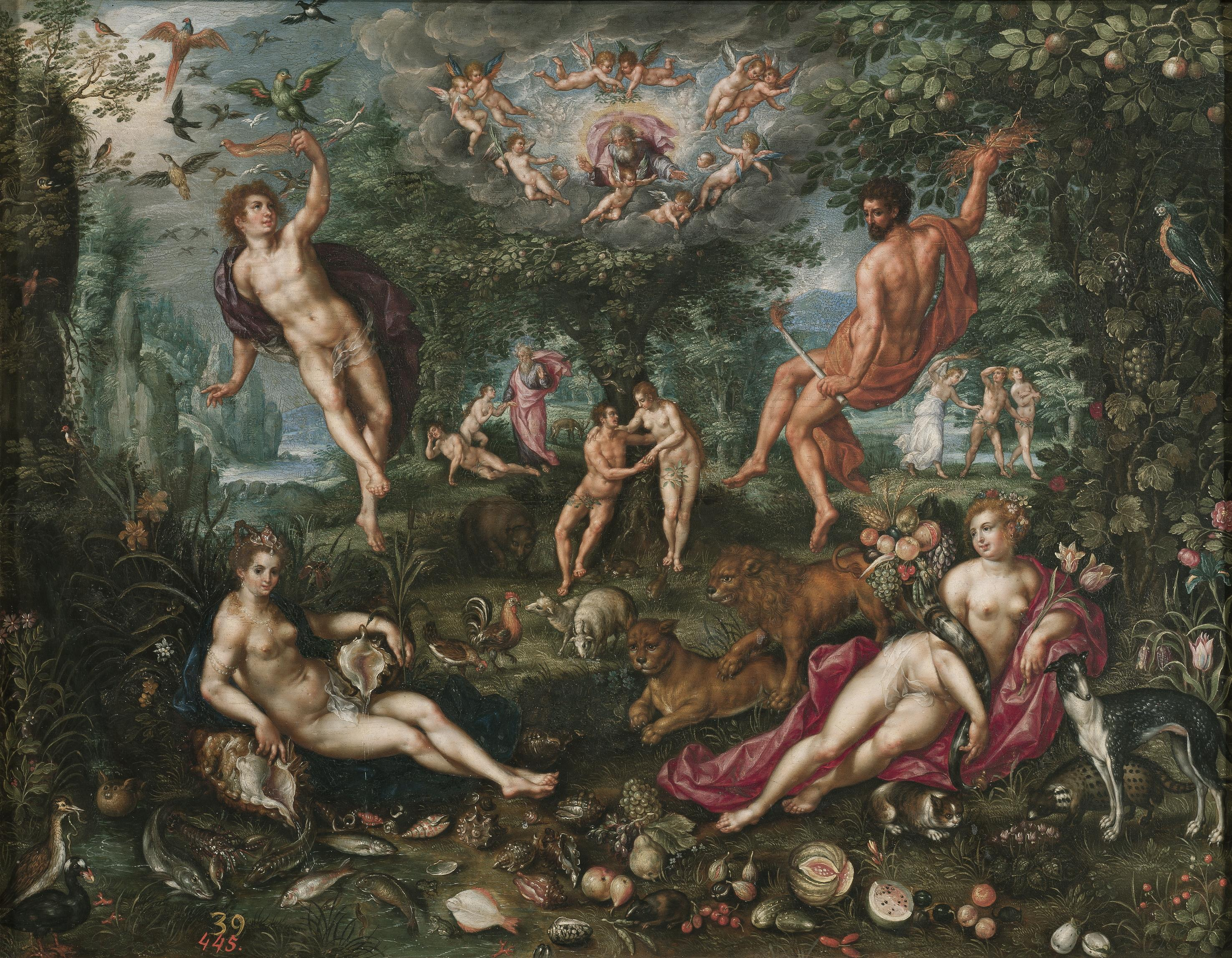
Paradise with the Four Elements, with Hendrick de Clerck

Some of his works have an archaic feeling and appear inspired by landscape painting of the 16th century. The style of his landscape paintings shows an affinity with the work of Gillis van Coninxloo. In comparison to van Coninxloo, van Alsloot's work is calmer and more static, uses a softer palette and is more precise of touch and more realistic. As such his work appears to be a synthesis of the styles of van Coninxloo and Jan Brueghel the Elder.

He also produced a number of landscape drawings that were likely intended as independent works of art. An example is the Forest Landscape with a Distant Castle of 1608 in the J. Paul Getty Museum, which is a fully developed and refined composition of a forest landscape with a view on buildings in the distance. The scenes in his landscape art often depict an actual site with topographical correctness and precision. He was also commissioned by the court of Albert and Isabella to paint views of their estates at Mariemont and Tervuren and of the Abbey of Groenendael.

He often collaborated with Hendrick de Clerck who painted the staffage in his landscape and mythological works. These landscapes contained mythological or biblical figures and were typically signed by both painters. There exist landscapes by van Alsloot not co-signed by the two painters in which the staffage was likely also made by de Clerck. The figures painted by de Clerck were draped in vividly coloured clothing, which clashed with the brown-green tonality of the landscape painted by Alsloot.

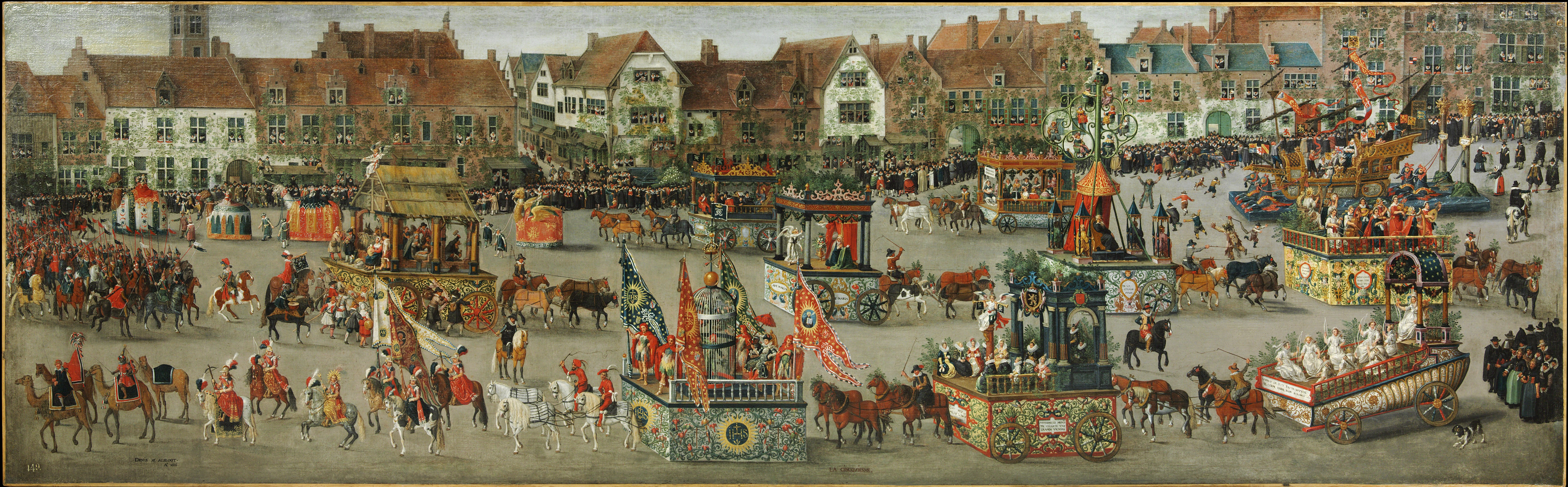
The Ommegang in Brussels

He received commissions to make paintings of local festivals and ceremonies. His most valuable commission by Archduchess Isabella was a series of eight paintings commemorating the Ommegang procession held in Brussels on 31 May 1615 for which he received 10,000 guilders. He received the commission before September 1615. It is likely that only six of the originally commissioned eight works were eventually executed. These were kept at the Archduchess' palace of Tervuren, located north-east of Brussels.

Two of the six paintings of the Ommegang painted by van Alsloot are considered lost. Of the surviving works, two are in the Victoria and Albert Museum in London and two in the Prado Museum in Madrid. One of the paintings held in the Victoria and Albert Museum was split in two at an unknown date. An undivided copy of it made around 1635 is in the collection of the Royal Museums of Fine Arts of Belgium in Brussels, while a copy of one of the halves is held by the Prado Museum. Artistically the works are not very remarkable as they mainly served a documentary, rather than an artistic, purpose. The paintings offer historians an interesting insight into this type of festivity.

That year's Ommegang procession was particularly festive since two weeks earlier, at the jay-shooting ceremony of the Crossbowmen's guild, Isabella had successfully shot the jay that had been attached to the spire of the Church of Our Blessed Lady of the Sablon. She was then crowned Queen of the guild.

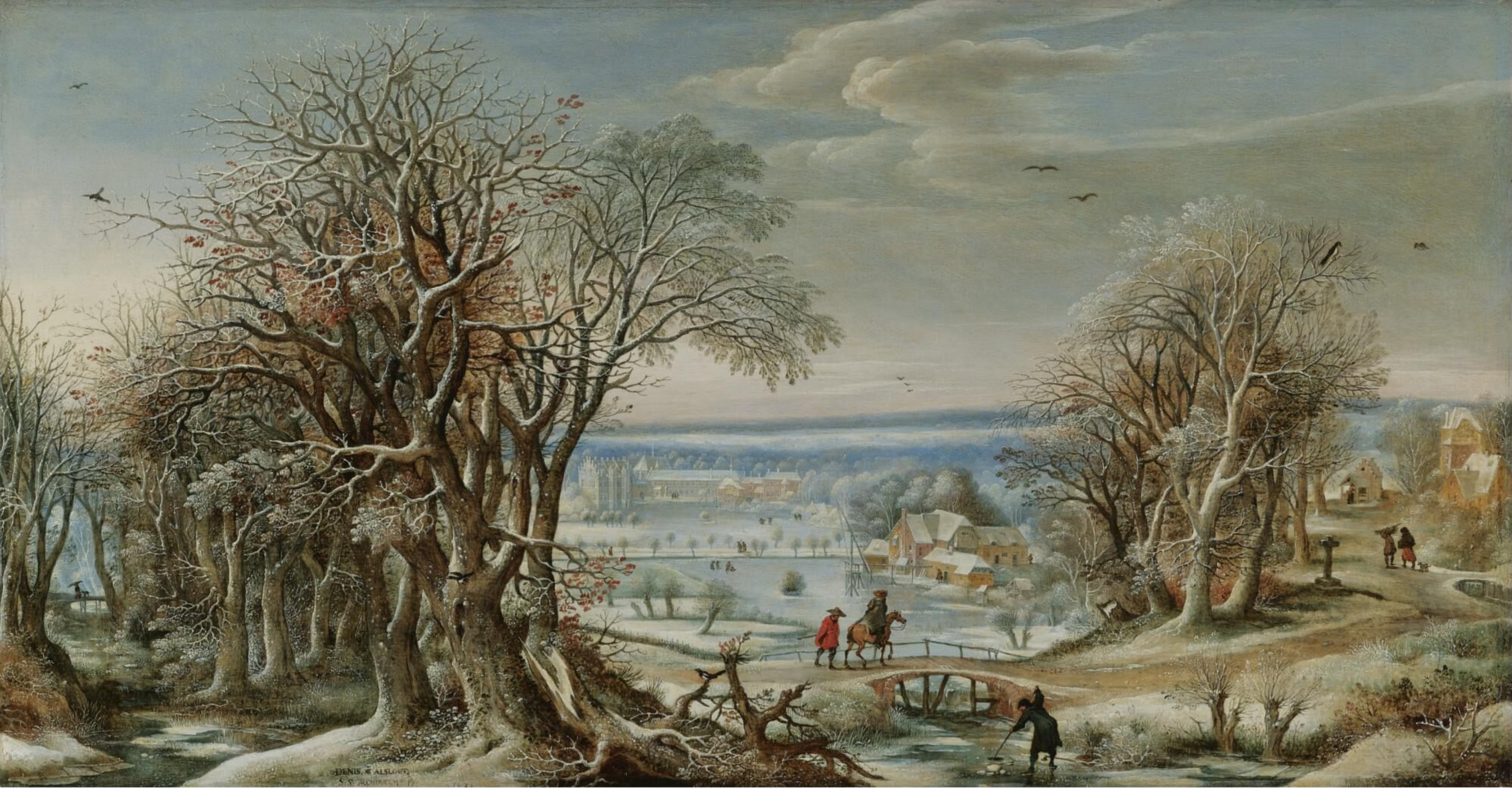
A View of the Abbey of Groenendael near Brussels in winter

It is assumed that Isabella had a political motive in ordering the series of paintings of the Ommegang. As her husband was ailing and likely to die soon, she wanted to show the court in Spain that she was regarded by the inhabitants of the Spanish Netherlands as their 'natural princess' and should therefore by allowed to continue to rule the Spanish Netherlands after her husband's death. For this reason, she sent some of the pictures of the Ommegang to the court in Spain. At the same time, the Brussels elites used the Ommegang for their own political purposes as it was a demonstration to the other sections of society in Brussels that they had the support of the Archduchess. The city of Brussels and the Church of Our Blessed Lady of the Sablon, the church around which the Ommegang revolved, ordered copies of the paintings.
