= Hendrick de Clerck =

Flemish painter

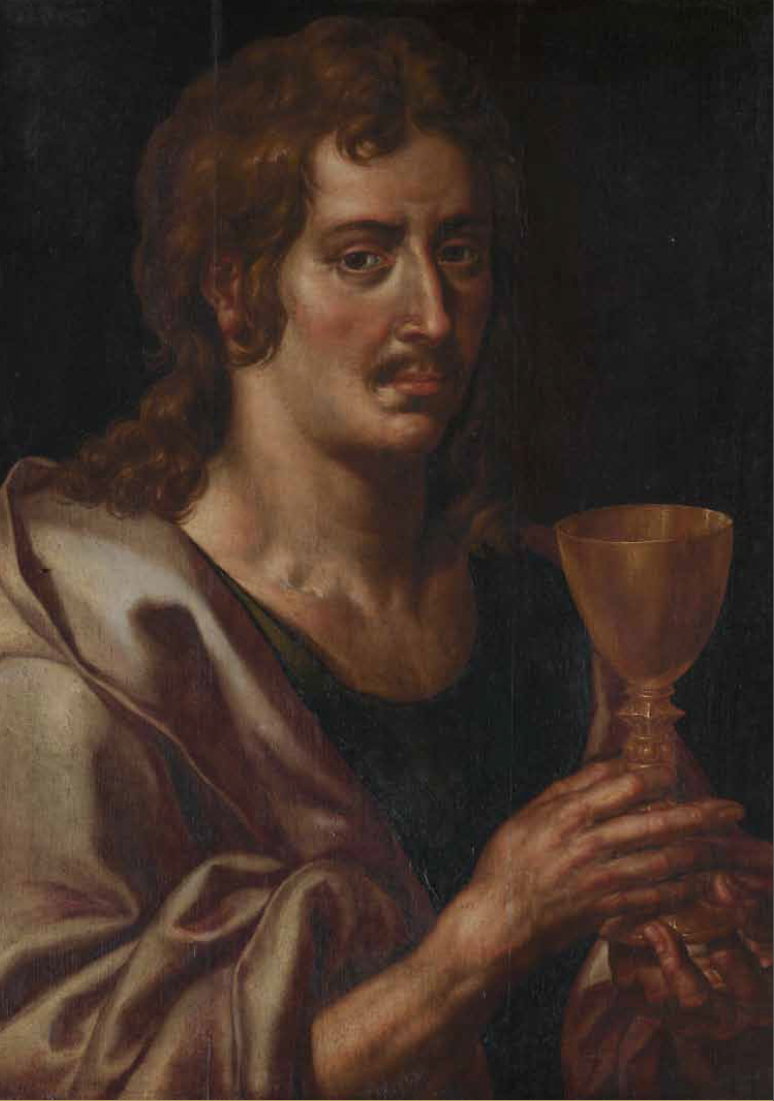
Presumed self-portrait as John the Apostle

Hendrick de Clerck (c. 1560 – 27 August 1630) was a Flemish painter active in Brussels during the late sixteenth and early seventeenth centuries. Stylistically he belongs to the late Mannerist generation of artists preceding Peter Paul Rubens and the Flemish Baroque movement. His paintings are similar to, but not as powerful, as those of Maerten de Vos, an artist 30 years his senior. He was court painter to the Governors General of the Spanish Netherlands.

== Life ==
The date of his birth is not known. It is assumed that he was born around 1660 in Brussels. His masters are not known with certainty. He may have trained with the Brussels painter Joos van Winghe and the Antwerp painter Maerten de Vos. The latter is assumed on the basis of the stylistic similarities between the works of the two artists. He may have resided and travelled in Italy between 1586 and 1590 as drawings of scenes in Rome, Tivoli and Naples are known. He is recorded in Brussels from 1590 onwards. He became a master of the Brussels painters' guild, where from 1601 to 1611 Jan van Overstraeten was registered as his pupil.

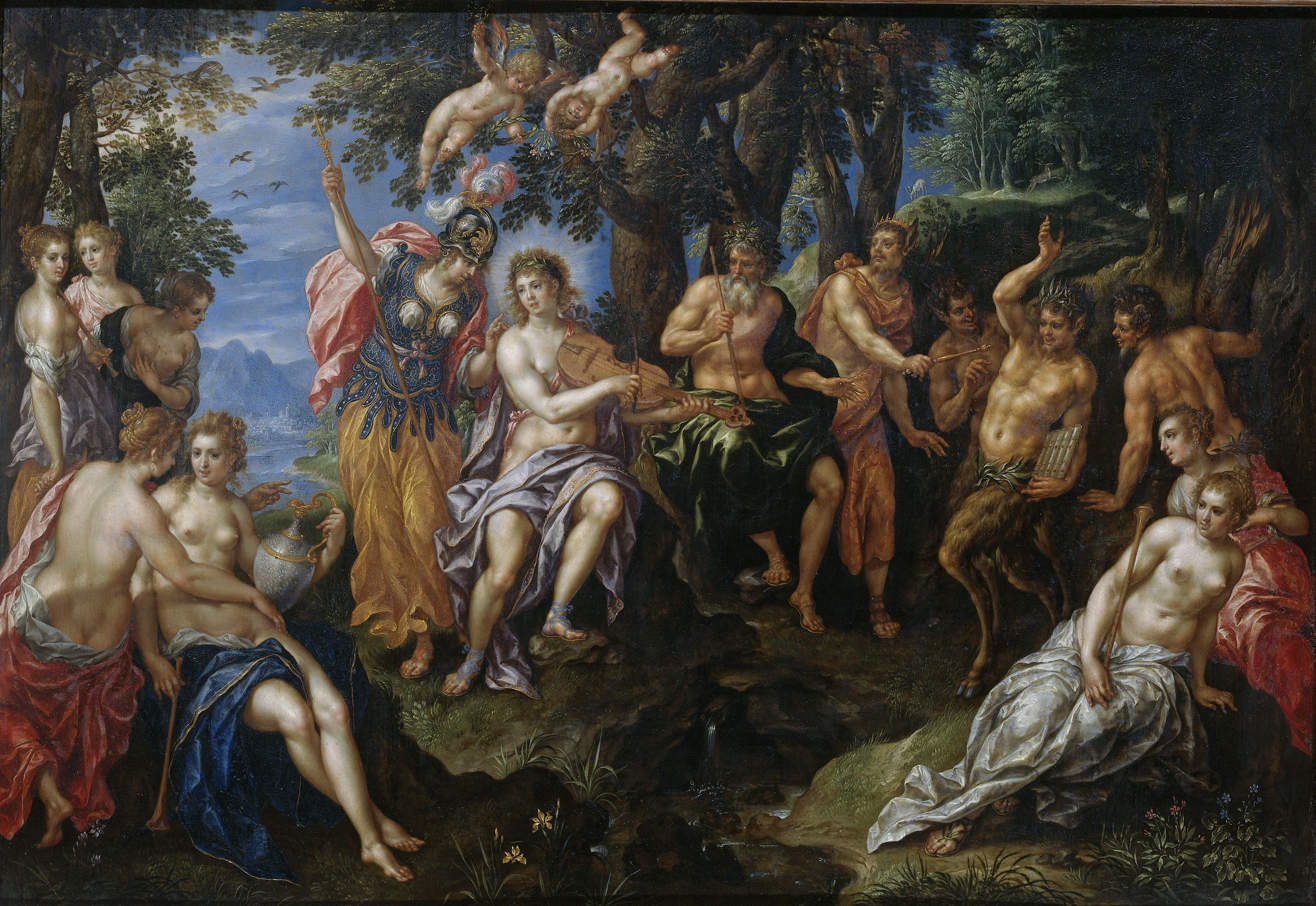
Judgement of Midas, c. 1600, Rijksmuseum, Amsterdam

By 1594 he was employed as court painter to Archduke Ernest at the court in Brussels. Following Ernest's death in 1596 he continued to hold this position in the service of the Archdukes Albert and Isabella, a reigning couple with conservative artistic tastes. His works served as propaganda for the Brussels court and aimed to support the Archducal couple's ambitions for the crown of Holy Roman Emperor. For this purpose, de Clerck developed a whole program of paintings in various genres (mythology, religion, allegory) which depicted the Archduke and Archduchess as Roman Gods, Christian saints and sage rulers. De Clerck designed some of the ephemeral decorations on the occasion of the Joyous entry of Archduke Albert into Brussels on 11 February 1596. He was in charge of decorating the largest of the triumphal arches. Eight of his design drawings have been preserved. They show, amongst others, Archduke Albert dressed in cardinal's robes, as a general at the walls of Lisbon and as a god descending to rescue 'Bruxella' (the personifaction of the city of Brussels).

Bruxella kneeling before the archduke Albert, 1596

When the imperial crown passed to Albert's brother in 1612, the Archducal couple abandoned their political ambitions and turned their attention to ruling the Low Countries and defending the Catholic Counter Reformation. In this new project Rubens, recently returned from Italy, would lead the artistic charge. De Clerck's courtly style fell out of favor and he faded into obscurity.

He was the father of Jacob de Clerck who also became a painter. He was buried in Brussels on 27 August 1630.

== Altarpieces ==
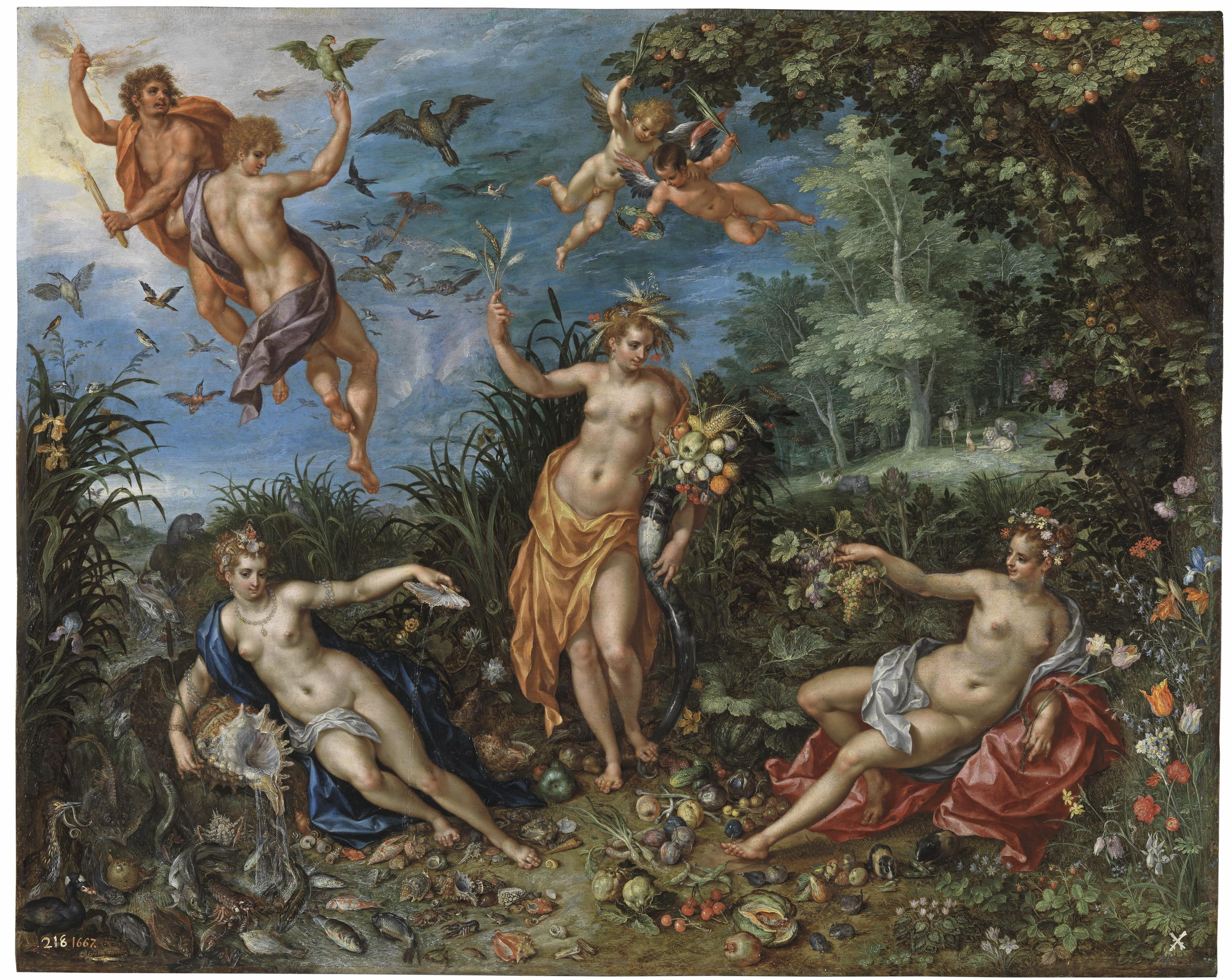
Hendrick De Clerck and Jan Brueghel the Elder, Abundance and the Four Elements, 1606, Prado, Madrid

Like Maerten de Vos in Antwerp a generation earlier, De Clerck was responsible for painting new altarpieces for churches in Brussels that had been lost during the iconoclastic disturbances of 1566. In these works he adopted the clear visual language common in post-Tridentine Counter-Reformation art. Despite continuing to work through the first three decades of the seventeenth-century, when the Flemish Baroque was in full bloom, his late works such as the Deposition for the St. Peter's Church in Anderlecht (1628) remained decidedly Mannerist. His somewhat outmoded tendencies are also reflected in his frequent use of the triptych format that had been popular with late Medieval and northern Renaissance artists.

== Cabinet paintings ==
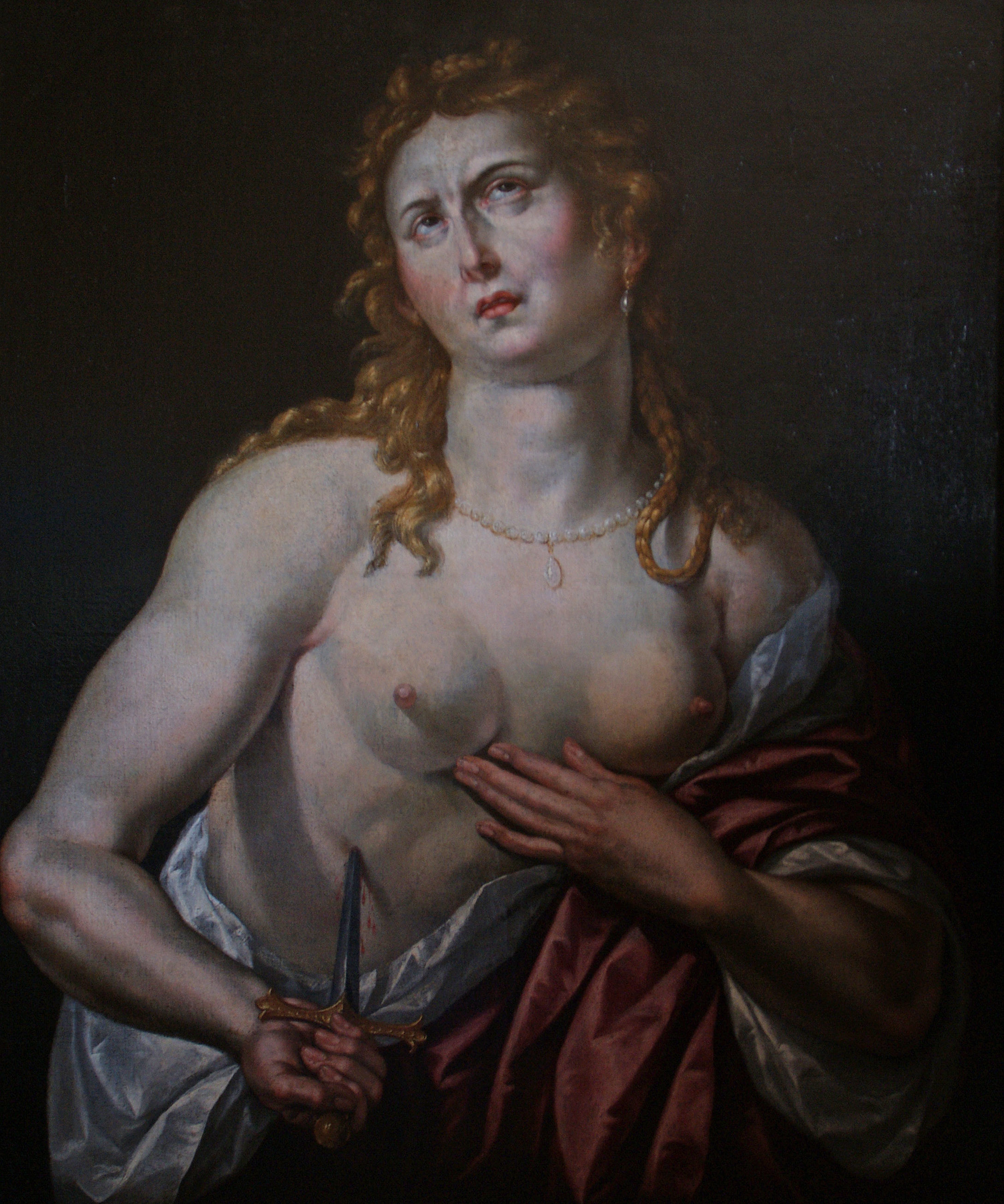
Lucretia, c. 1610. Private collection

De Clerck was a specialist painter of small cabinet paintings depicting biblical, allegorical and mythological subjects, which were collected by Brussels' aristocratic patrons. Frequently he painted the figures, while collaborating with other artists, such as Jan Brueghel the Elder and Denijs van Alsloot, for the landscapes and other features.

== Sources ==
- Hans Vlieghe (1998). Flemish Art and Architecture, 1585–1700, Pelican history of art. New Haven: Yale University Press. ISBN 0-300-07038-1
- Katharina Van Cauteren, 'Eight Unknown Designs by Hendrick de Clerck for Archduke Albert's Entry into Brussels in 1596', Simiolus, 2010, 1: 18–32.
- Katharina Van Cauteren, 'Le printemps au milieu de l'hyver. Hendrick De Clerck (1560–1630) en het aartshertogelijke zelfbeeld tussen canon en propaganda', PhD dissertation, Leuven, 2010.
