= Jacques d'Arthois =

Flemish landscape painter (1613-86)

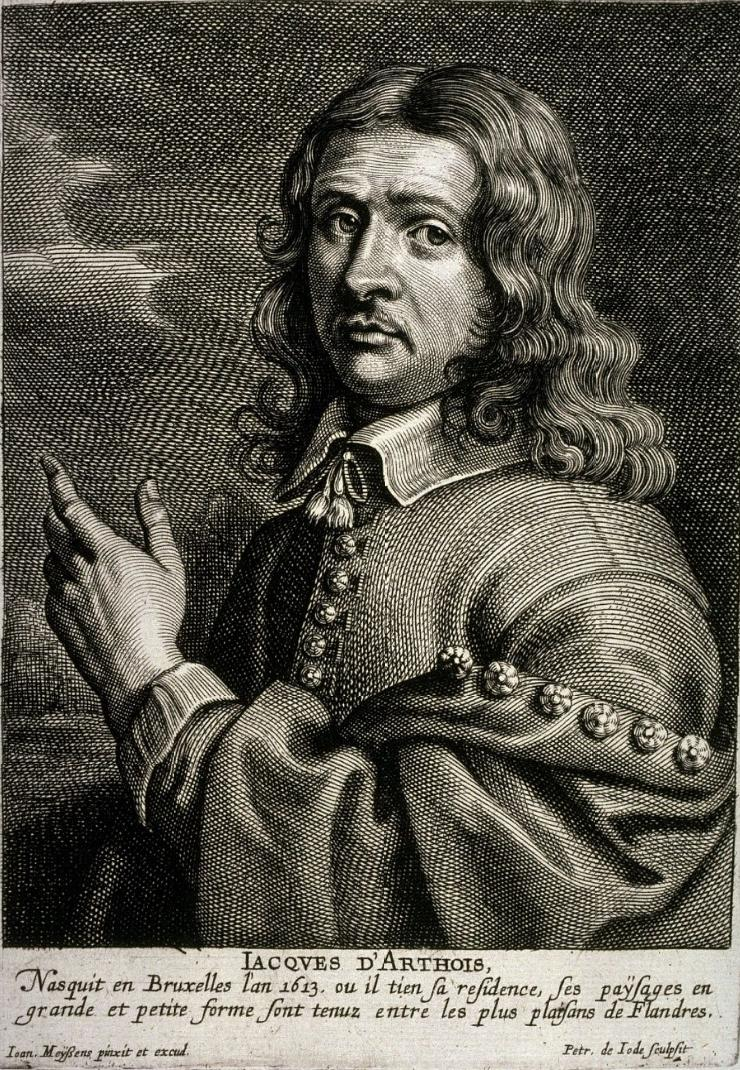
- Portrait by Pieter de Jode II after Jan Meyssens
- Born: Jacques van Arthois; 1613, Brussels
- Died: 1686 (aged 72–73) , Brussels
- Known for: Landscape painting, tapestry design

Jacques d'Arthois (Note: Variant names: Jacques d'Artoijs, Jacques d'Artoys, Jacques d'Artois; signed: 'Jacques d'Arthois', 'Jac d'Arthois' and 'J. d'Arthois') (12 October 1613 (baptised) – May 1686) was a Flemish painter and tapestry designer who specialized in wooded landscapes with figures. He often depicted the woods around his native Brussels. Jacques d'Arthois was an influential painter and one of the few 17th century landscape painters from Brussels whose fame was remembered in the following centuries as his style was imitated and followed by many other landscape artists.

== Life ==
Jacques d'Arthois was born in Brussels as the son of Henri Artois. He was baptized on 12 October 1613. On 11 January 1625 he became an apprentice to Jan Mertens, an artist whose work is not known. He became a master in the Brussels Guild of St. Luke in 1634.

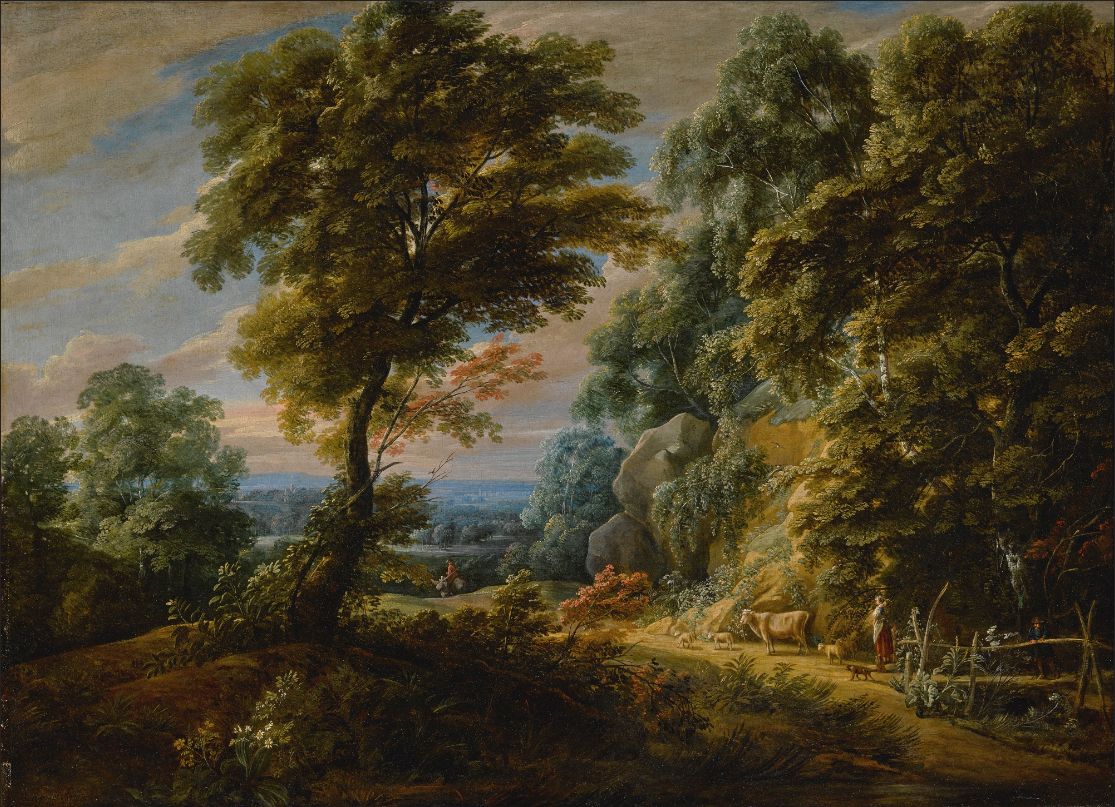
Wooded landscape with a shepherdess passing a steep bank

He married Maria Sampels with whom he had eight children. Their son Jan Baptist became a landscape painter in the style of his father. Jacques d'Arthois had his own workshop and took on pupils, among them his brother Nicolaes (1617–?), his son Jan Baptist (1638 – after 1657), Alexander van Herssen, Philip van Dapels and Cornelis van Empel. The Antwerp landscape painter Cornelis Huysmans claimed he spent two years in the workshop of d'Arthois but there is no documentary evidence which corroborates this.

Around 1650, the governor of the Spanish Netherlands Luis de Benavides Carrillo, Marquis of Caracena, awarded Jacques d'Arthois a distinction for reasons that are now unknown. In 1655 he was officially recognized as a tapestry cartoon designer of the city of Brussels by the magistrate of the city, as a replacement of Lodewijk de Vadder who had died. He was already at that time deemed to be a skillful artist in that specialty.

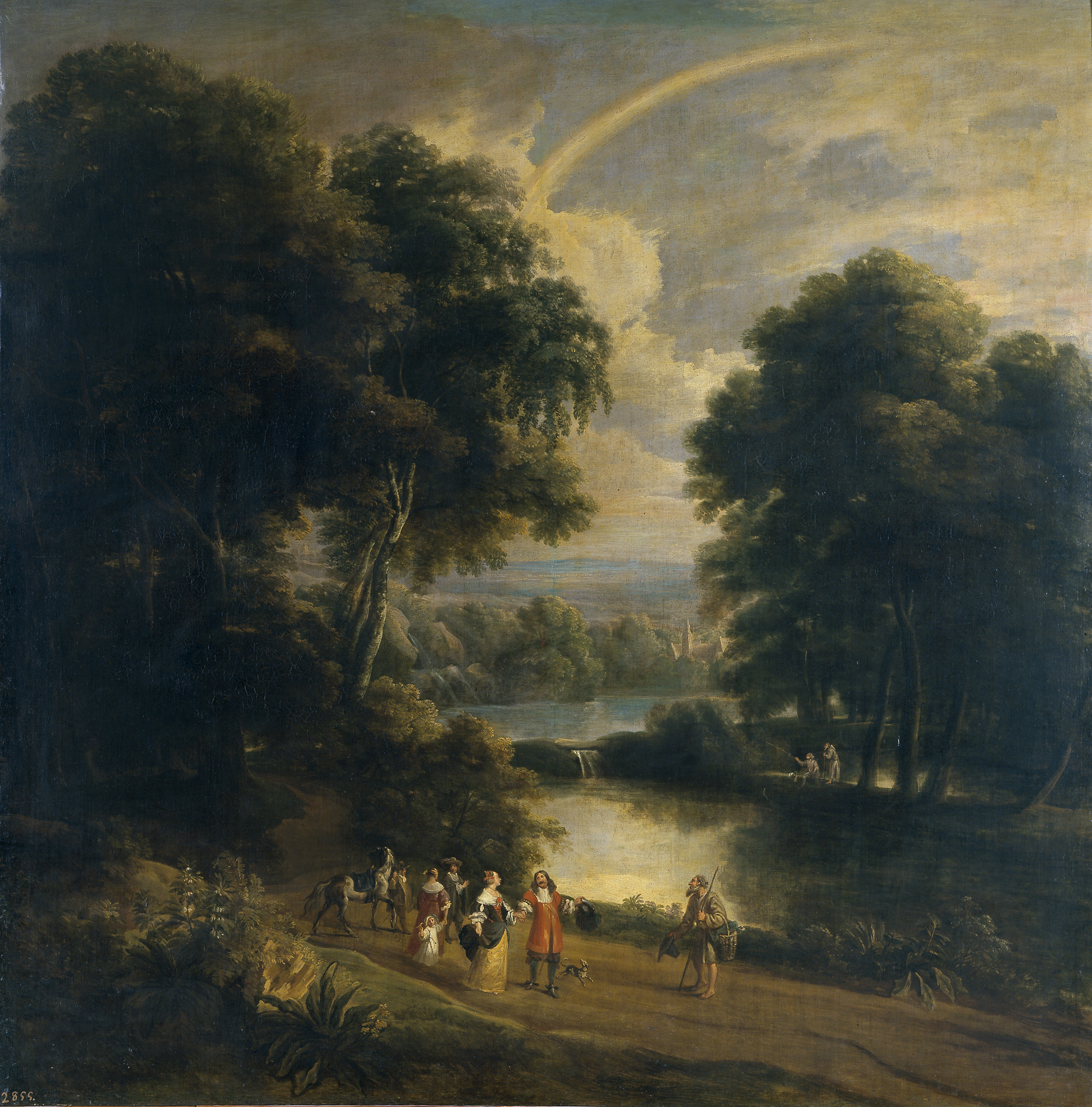
Landscape along a river

At the time of his death he owned several houses (one of which was in the Sonian forest) and a painting collection, even though his lavish lifestyle had left him severely in debt. He died in Brussels.

== Work ==
Jacques d'Arthois was a landscape painter who specialized in wooded landscapes with figures. The figures were often added by other artists, including David Teniers the Younger and Gonzales Coques. Sometimes art dealers would commission local painters (such as Peter van Halen in Antwerp) to add figures to works of Jacques d'Arthois that they had acquired. While most of his works are of regular size, he gained a reputation with his very large landscapes which at that time were starting to become acceptable for the decoration of churches, abbeys etc. This explains the many commissions the artist received from religious communities.

The work of his brother Nicolaes d'Arthois and his son Jan-Baptist, both of whom worked in his workshop is not always indistinguishable from his. In fact no signed works of Nicolaes and Jan Baptist are known and as a result numerous works made by them may have been attributed to Jacques d'Arthois. Jacques d'Arthois was influenced by other landscape artists of his time such as Denis van Alsloot and especially Lodewijk de Vadder.

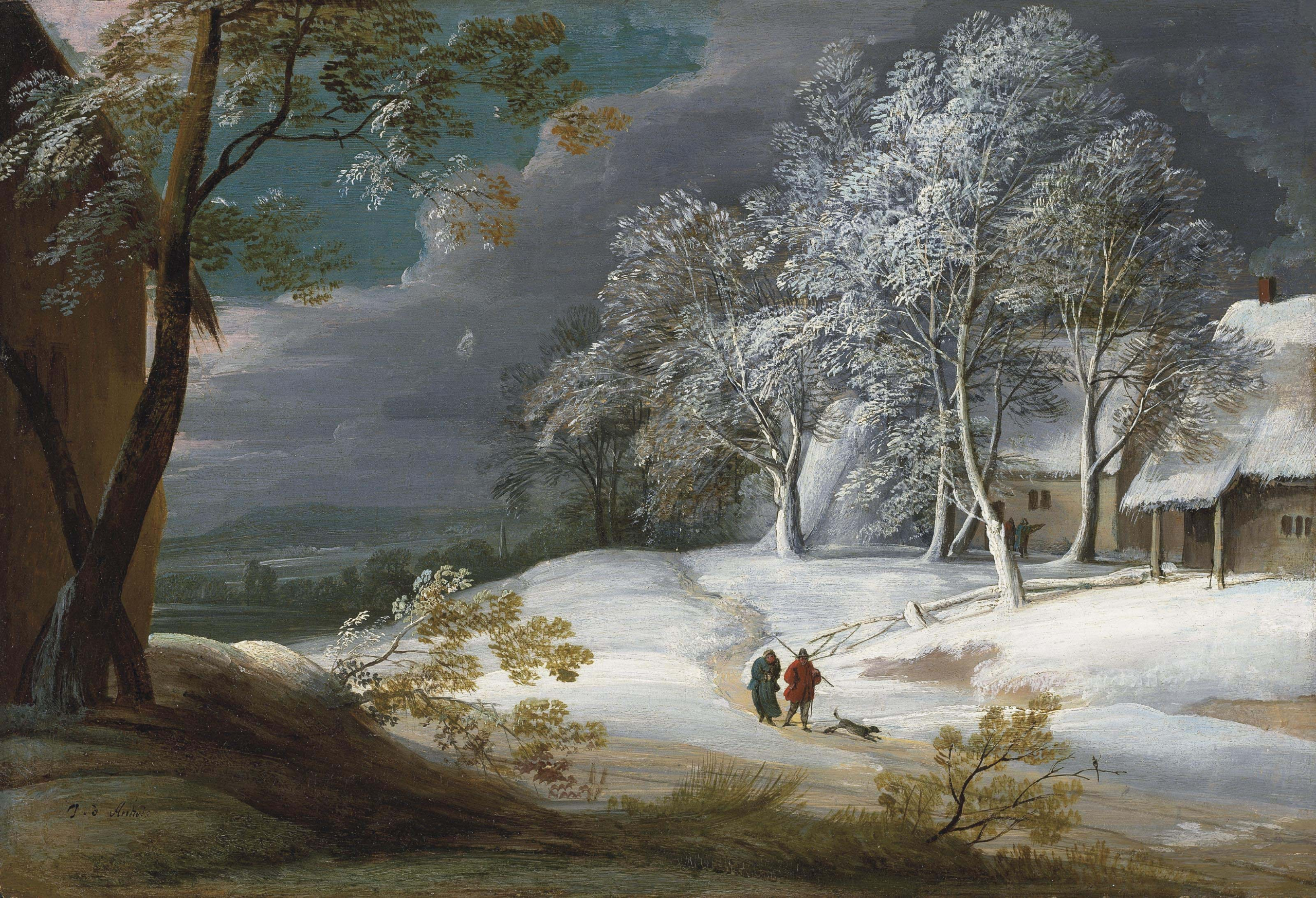
Winter landscape with figures and a dog on a track

As only a few of his works are dated, it has been difficult to trace the development of his style. Nevertheless, based on the engravings made by Wenceslaus Hollar around 1650 after works by Jacques d'Arthois, it is possible to ascertain that his early works were quite close to the paintings of Lodewijk de Vadder. These early compositions leave the foreground rather uncluttered, show a sandy path sinking obliquely and rather compact clusters of trees. Later he turned towards more elaborate composition schemes that gave up realism in favour of decorative grandeur. In these later works, the landscape expands and the ample and powerful forms are underlined by contrasts of color. The foreground is furnished with many plants sometimes with bright flowers, which are set off by truncated stumps or the underground.

Jacques d'Arthois is a key member of the landscape painters active in Brussels in the 17th century who are collectively referred to as the Sonian Forest painters because of their interest in depicting the Sonian Forest in the environs of Brussels. This school of landscape painters included landscape painters such as Denis van Alsloot, Lodewijk de Vadder and Cornelis Huysmans.

He was particularly skilled at painting tree trunks covered in moss and ivy.
