= Lodewijk de Vadder =

Flemish Baroque landscape painter, draughtsman, engraver and tapestry designer

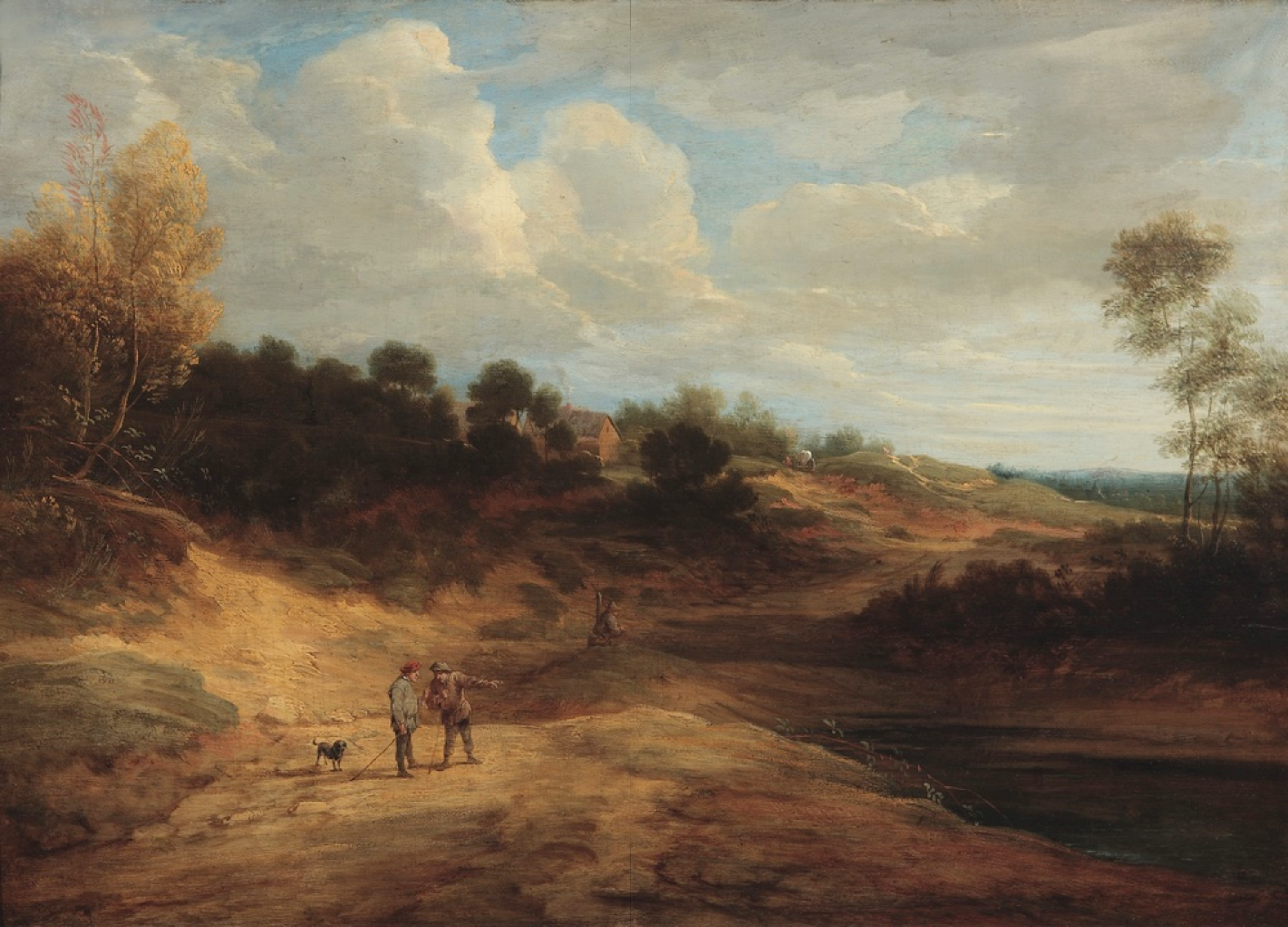
Extensive dune landscape with travelers and a dog on a path alongside an inlet

Lodewijk de Vadder (1605, Grimbergen – 1655, Brussels) was a Flemish Baroque landscape painter, draughtsman, engraver and tapestry designer. His landscapes represent a move away from the Mannerist tradition of landscapes painting in Flemish art towards a more naturalistic approach exemplified by looser brushwork and an emphasis on atmospheric effects. He was the first Flemish landscape painter who painted dune landscapes as the primary feature of his landscapes. While his loose brush handling shows the influence of Rubens and Adriaen Brouwer, his restrained palette shows his awareness of developments in the Dutch Republic.

== Life ==
He was born in Grimbergen and was baptized on 8 April 1605. He was the son of Gielis de Vadder and Margriet Cocx. He came from a family of painters: his father and brothers Philippe (born 1590) and Huybrecht (born 1592) were painters. While there are no records on his apprenticeship, it is assumed that his brother Philippe who became a master of the Brussels Guild of St. Luke in 1613 was his teacher.

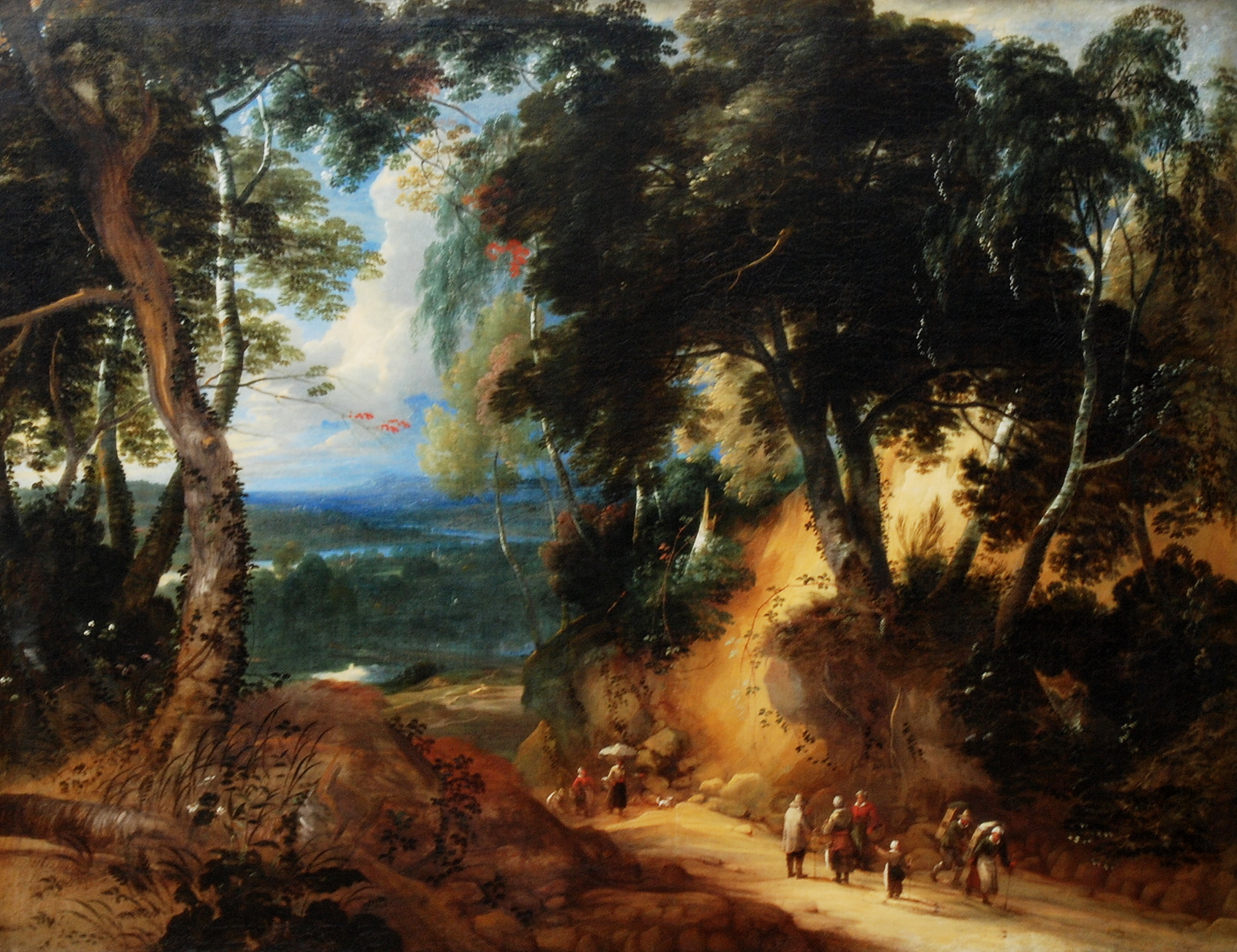
The Sonian Forest with peasants

He became a master of the Brussels Guild of St. Luke in 1628. In 1644 he obtained from the Brussels city authorities a privilege to make tapestry cartoons. He made cartoons principally for the Brussels weaving workshops of Jan Cordijs and Boudewijn van Beveren.

His pupils were Ignatius van der Stock, Jan Claessens and possibly also Lucas Achtschellinck.

== Work ==
De Vadder painted the landscapes with woods and rural areas around Brussels with a preference for sunken paths. It was originally believed that he only produced small-scale works marked with the monogram LDV. It has been demonstrated that he was responsible for a number of large-scale works that were formerly attributed to his younger contemporary and follower Jacques d'Arthois. De Vadder, his pupil Ignatius van der Stock, his presumed pupil Lucas Achtschellinck and d'Arthois are usually referred to collectively as "The Sonian Forest Painters" as they often depicted the woods and sand banks in the Sonian Forest near Brussels.

Important influences on De Vadder were the late landscapes of Peter Paul Rubens as well as the landscapes of Adriaen Brouwer. De Vadder's style is freer in composition and, with its loose, broad brushwork, reminiscent of Rubens' style. His landscapes represent a departure from the Mannerist tradition of landscapes painting in Flemish art as represented by artists such as Denis van Alsloot in favor of a more naturalistic approach. Rather than the densely populated forests of van Alsloot, he depicted landscapes in which emptiness dominates. He emphasized atmospheric effects over detailed depiction of the features of the landscapes. He was the first Flemish landscape painter who painted dune landscapes as the primary feature of his landscapes. His palette is more restrained than that of the Flemish landscapes tradition which shows his awareness of developments in the Dutch Republic, in particular the works of Pieter Dircksz Santvoort, Pieter de Molijn and Jan van Goyen.

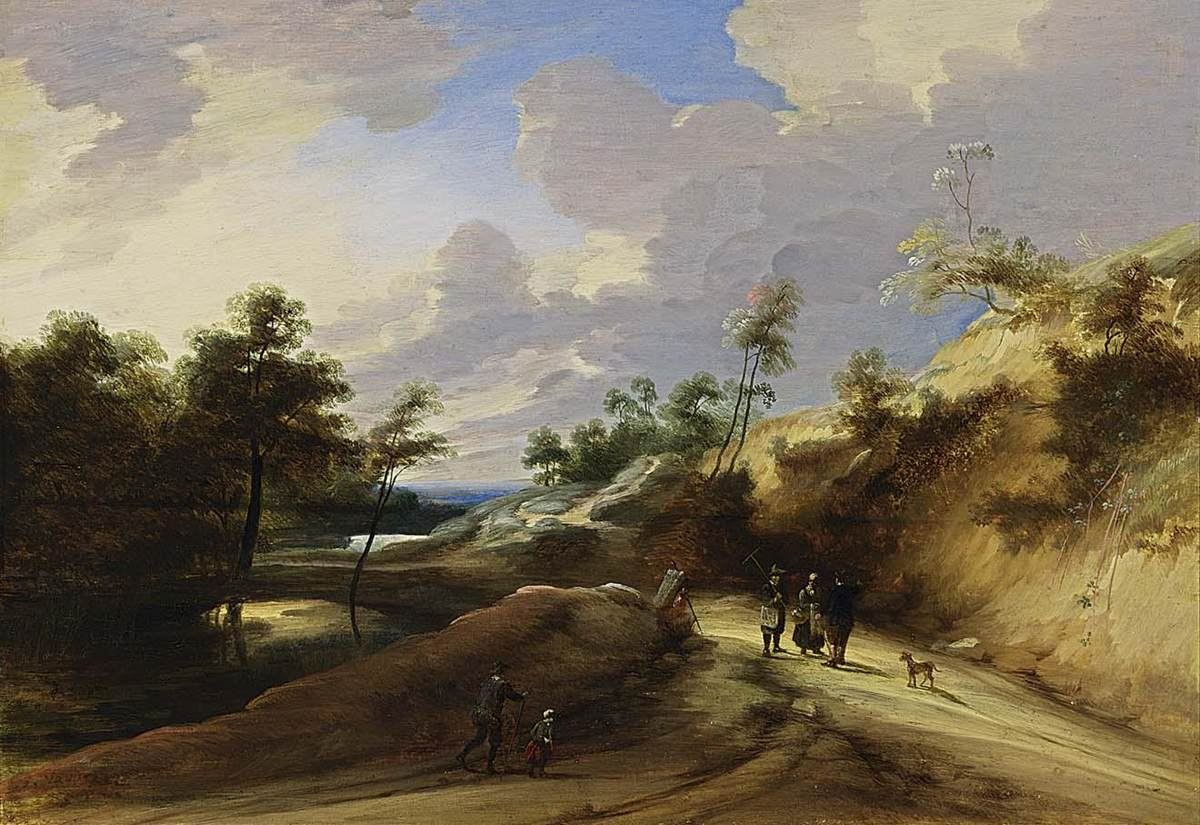
Wooded dune landscape

As was not unusual at the time, de Vadder collaborated with other artists. So, he painted landscapes for a.o. Gaspard de Crayer, Antoon Sallaert or Michael Sweerts, and David Teniers painted the staffage of several of his paintings. He was likely responsible for the large trees that appear in some of the works in the never-finished cycle on the Life of Henry IV (1628–30) created by Rubens and Peter Snayers. An example is the Henri IV at the siege of Amiens (1630, Gothenburg Museum of Art) The Life of Henry series was commissioned from Rubens by Marie de' Medici in February 1622.

He also drew cartoons for various tapestry manufacturers in Brussels. Around 1650 he collaborated with Jacob Jordaens on tapestry designs for the tapestry workshop of Jan Cordijs. He was an accomplished draughtsman and some of his drawings were engraved by other artists such as Lucas Vorsterman the Elder and Wenceslaus Hollar. He was a gifted printmaker himself. A series of 8 landscape etchings by his hand referred to as the 'Small landscapes' was published by the Antwerp publisher Frans van den Wyngaerde.
