= Marieke Huisman =

Dutch computer scientist

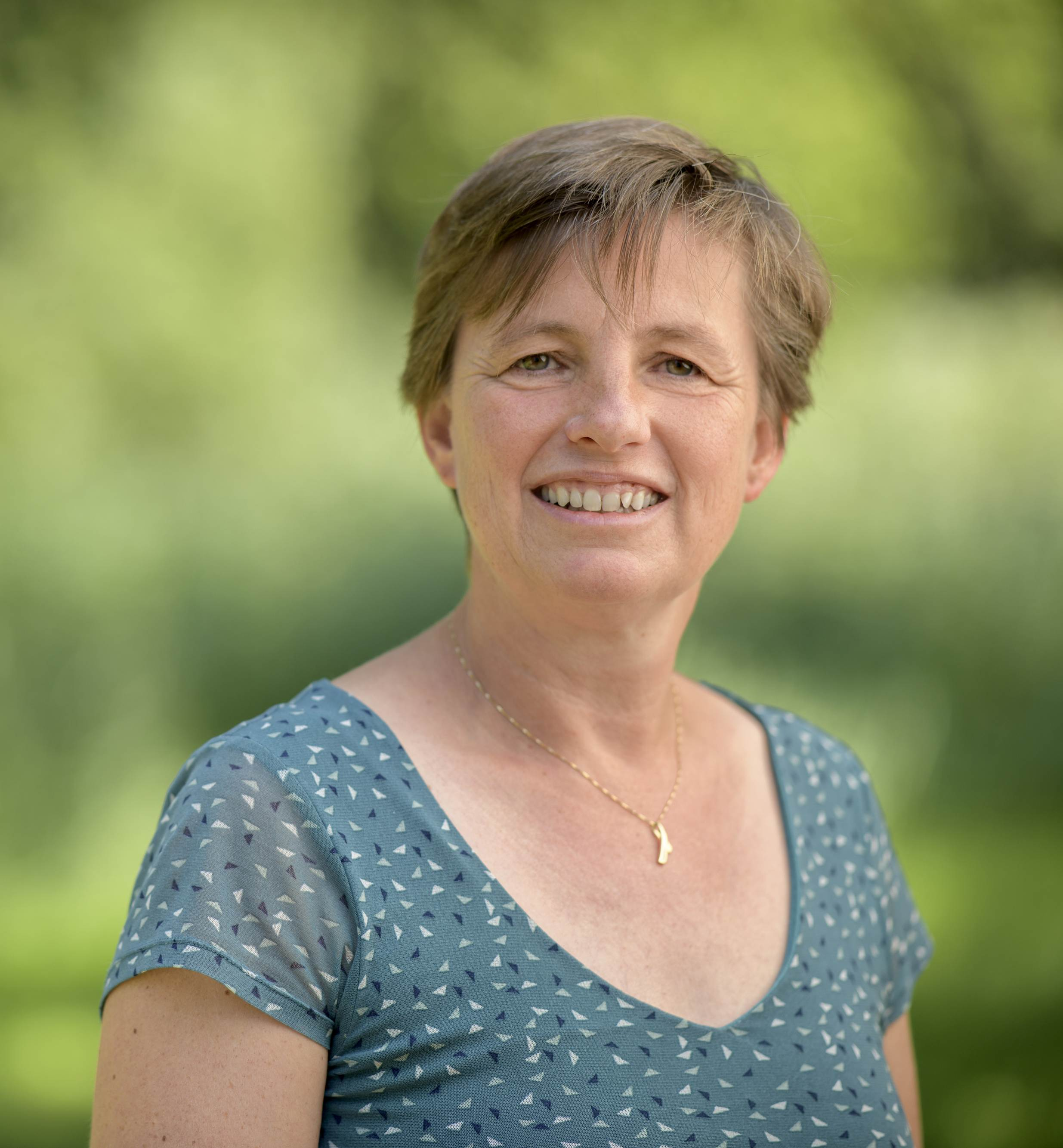
- Marieke Huisman in 2019
- Born: 3 May 1973 (age 53); Utrecht, Netherlands
- Citizenship: Dutch
- Education: Utrecht University
- Known for: Software Reliability, VerCors toolset
- Scientific career
- Doctoral advisor: Henk Barendregt

Marieke Huisman (born 3 May 1973) is a Dutch Computer Scientist and a professor of Software Reliability at the University of Twente, where she leads the Formal Methods and Tools Group.

== Career ==
Huisman graduated from Utrecht University in 1996. She obtained her PhD at Radboud University Nijmegen in 2001; her dissertation, entitled Reasoning about Java programs in higher order logic using PVS and Isabelle, was supervised by Henk Barendregt.

From 2001 to 2008 she worked at the INRIA Sophia Antipolis Research Centre in France, before joining the University of Twente in the Netherlands. Huisman received an ERC Starting Grant in 2010 and an NWO Vici Grant in 2017. She was awarded the Netherlands Prize for ICT Research in 2013 and the Professor De Winter prize in 2014.

Since July 2017, Huisman is a full professor at the University of Twente. She held her inaugural lecture, Software Reliability for Everyone, on 26 January 2021.

Huisman is chair of VERSEN (VEReniging Software Engineering Nederland), the Dutch National Association for Software Engineering, chairperson of The Ambassadors Network, which advises the executive board of the University of Twente on diversity policies, and board member of Stichting Digitaal Burgerschap Nederland, the Netherlands Digital Citizenship Foundation

== Awards and honours ==
Year	Organisation	Award / Honour
2013	Dutch ICT research platform IPN and Netherlands Organisation for Scientific Research	Netherlands Prize for ICT Research
2014	University of Twente	Professor de Winter Prize
