= Emma Huismans =

Emma Huismans (born 10 July 1947) is an Afrikaans writer, journalist, and activist born in the Netherlands. At the age of five, her family moved to South Africa where she learned Afrikaans. She was later a reporter for Crisis News. Her efforts against apartheid were complicated by her being white, Afrikaans, and lesbian. This is dealt with in her premier work Berigte van weerstand. (English translation: Reports of resistance) After that, she wrote a few novels, but tended to do better in non-fiction. Her work is often deemed angry and frustrated with the difficulties of post-apartheid South Africa. In 1990 she returned to The Netherlands.

== Bibliography ==
- Berigte van weerstand (1990)
- Requiem op ys (1992)
- Werken met werkelijkheid (1993)
- Sonate vir wraak (1994)
