= Jan Baptist Huysmans =

Flemish painter (1654–1716)

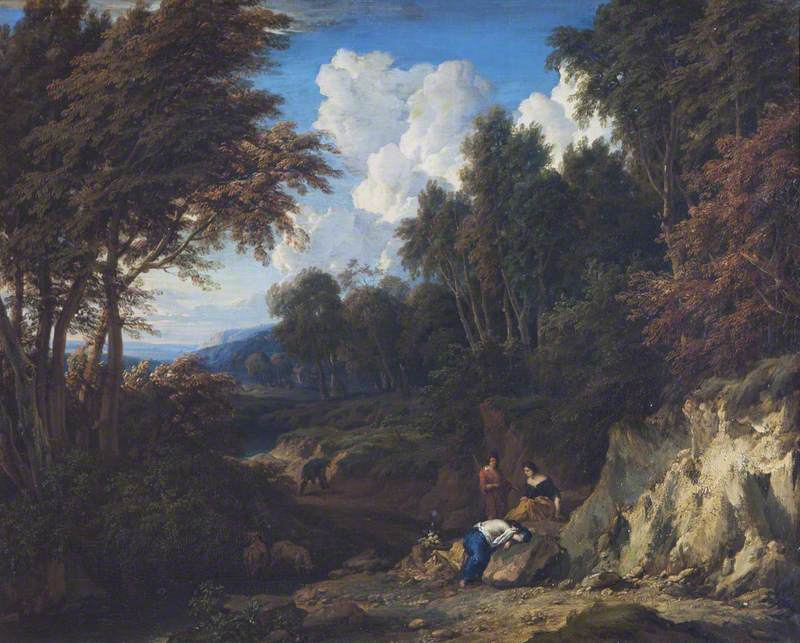
Valley landscape with a grieving woman and companions

Jan Baptist Huysmans (born 1654 in Antwerp; died 1716 in Antwerp) was a Flemish painter active in Antwerp who is known for his Italianate and arcadian landscapes and architectural capricci.

== Life ==
Jan Baptist Huysmans was born in Antwerp as the son of Hendrick Huysmans and Catharina van der Meyden. He was baptized in Antwerp Cathedral on 7 October 1654. Jan Baptist was the brother of Cornelis, a prominent landscape painter. His brother Cornelis was possibly his teacher. He possibly also studied for a while with the marine painter Hendrik van Minderhout. He was registered as a pupil at the Antwerp Guild of Saint Luke in 1675/76 and he became a master in 1676/77.

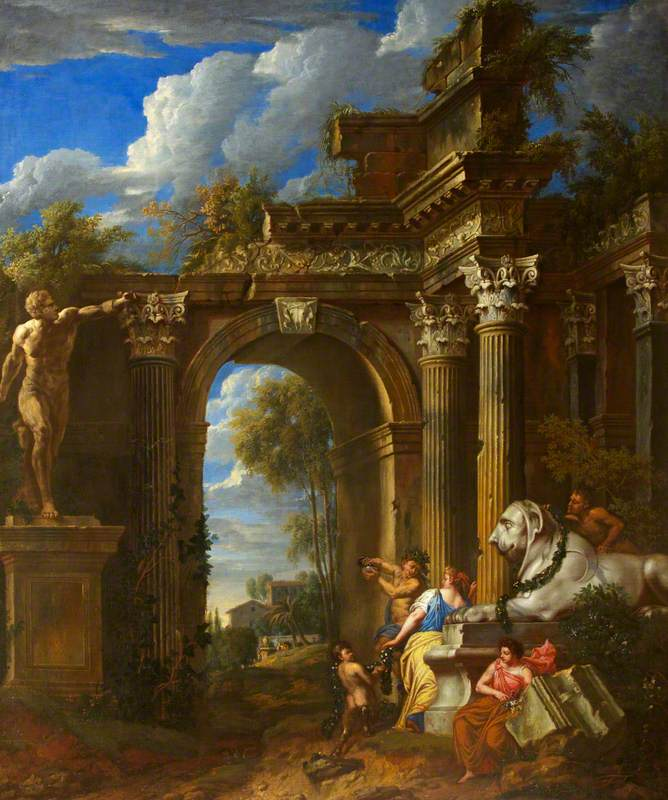
A ruined classical archway

He possibly influenced Cornelis' son Pieter Balthasar. In 1697-98 he had a registered pupil by the name of Peeter Geeraerts.

He died in Antwerp.

== Work ==
Jan Baptist Huysman was a landscape artist. His work has often been confused with those of his elder brother Cornelis who painted the same subject matter. A work entitled Landscape with animals (Royal Museums of Fine Arts of Belgium), which is signed and dated to 1697, and another one entitled Landscape with Ruins (Shipley Art Gallery), which is signed and dated to 1694, have allowed more of his oeuvre to be distinguished from that of his brother.

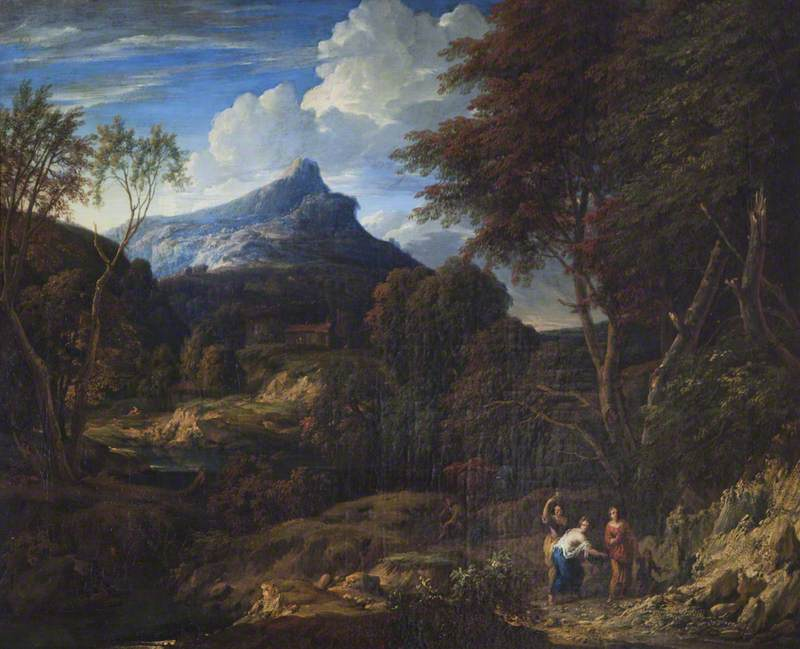
A Mountainous Landscape with Women Fetching Water

Like his brother Cornelis he painted imaginary Italianate landscapes. His works are often a fusion of the style of North European wooded landscape painting with the Italian inspired vista. In his landscapes with ruins Huysmans also shows his indebtedness to the type of architectural landscape painting first popularised by Claude Lorrain in Rome and by Nicolas Poussin. These landscapes often depict a glimpse of a pastoral idyll although they may sometimes include elements such as ruins and a tomb, which remind the viewer of the closeness of death.

Jan Baptist Huysmans also painted architectural capricci, i.e. architectural fantasies, which place together buildings, archaeological ruins and other architectural elements in fictional and often fantastical combinations and may also include staffage (figures). An example is A ruined classical archway (National Trust, Dinton, Wiltshire), which shows ruins of a triumphal arch and the statue of the Borghese Gladiator. In the right foreground are also depicted satyrs and nymphs who are festooning an Egypto-Roman stone lion.

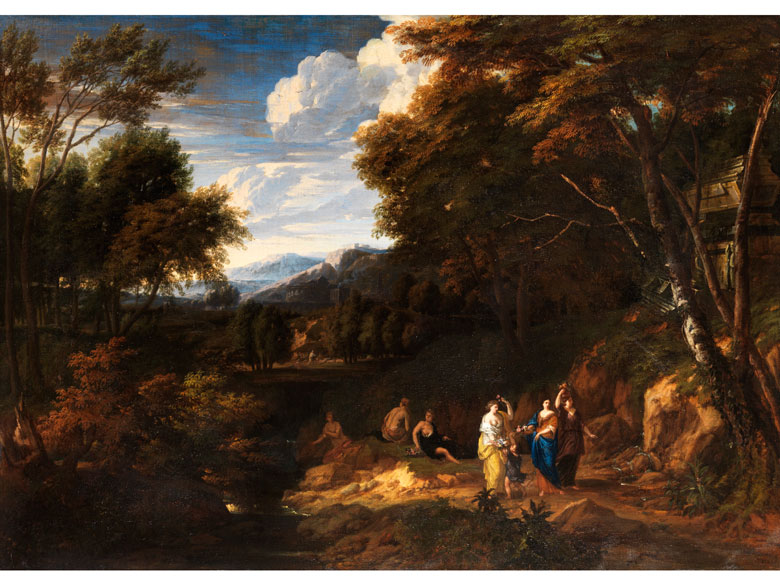
Arcadian landscape

As was common practice at the time, he collaborated with specialist painters in Antwerp such as the history and figure painter Jan Erasmus Quellinus. Jan Baptist Huysmans would typically provide the landscape elements in these collaborative works. Examples of collaborations with Quellinus are the Mercury turns the jealous Aglaulus into stone in the Musée des beaux-arts de Marseille (c. 1700) and the composition A ruined classical archway mentioned in the previous paragraph.
