= Cornelis Huysmans =

Flemish landscape painter (1648–1727)

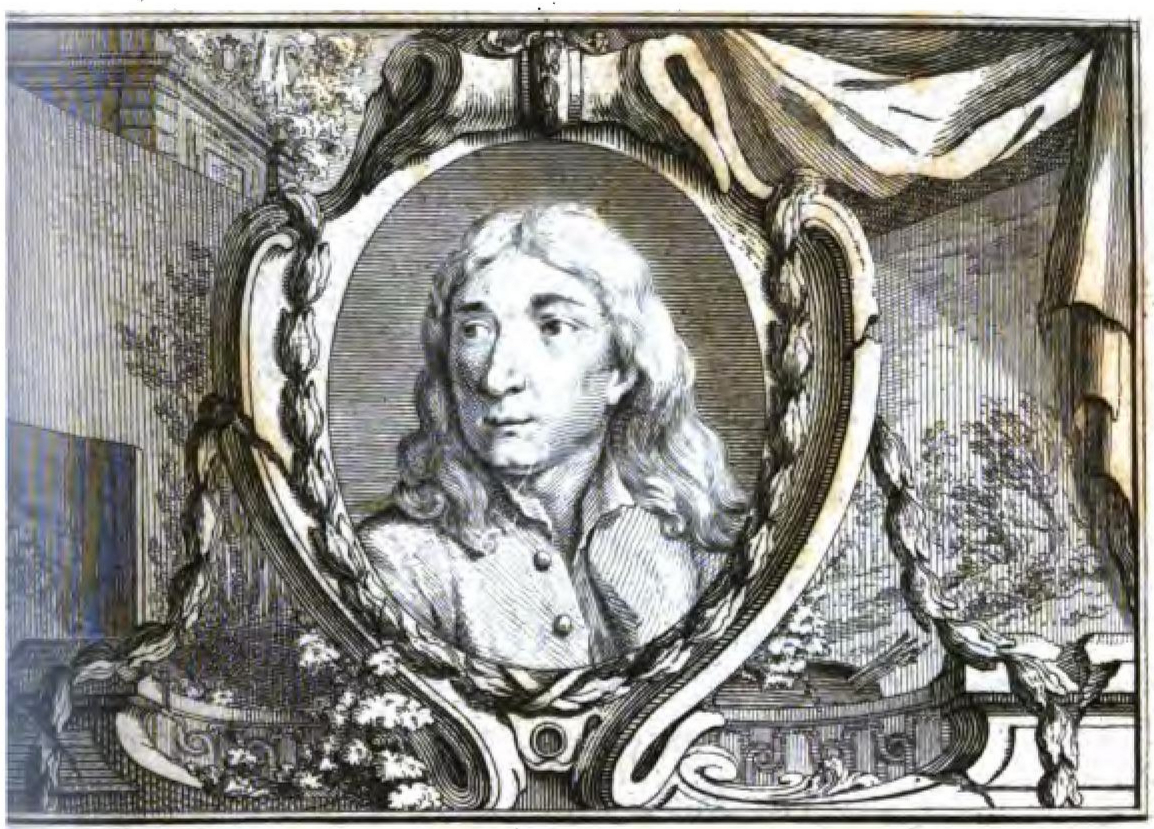
- Huysmans' portrait in the Lives of Flemish, German, and Dutch painters
- Born: Baptized on 2 April 1648, Antwerp
- Died: 1 June 1727, Mechelen
- Known for: Landscape painting

Cornelis Huysmans (baptized 2 April 1648 in Antwerp; died 1 June 1727 in Mechelen) was a Flemish landscape painter who was active in Antwerp, Brussels and Mechelen. Huysmans held a foremost position in Flemish landscape painting in the late 17th and early 18th century and was particularly known for his pseudo-Italianate landscapes with mountains in the background, which show the influence of Nicolas Poussin and Jacques d'Arthois.

== Life ==
Cornelis Huysmans was born in Antwerp to Hendrik Huysmans and Catharina van der Meyden (sometimes also referred to as 'Catharina van der Heyden'). His father's profession has been variously described as that of a 'bouwmeester' (master builder) or that of a 'houtbreker, munter ende werckman in Sijne Majesteytsmunte' (wood breaker, coin maker and workman in His Majesty's Mint).

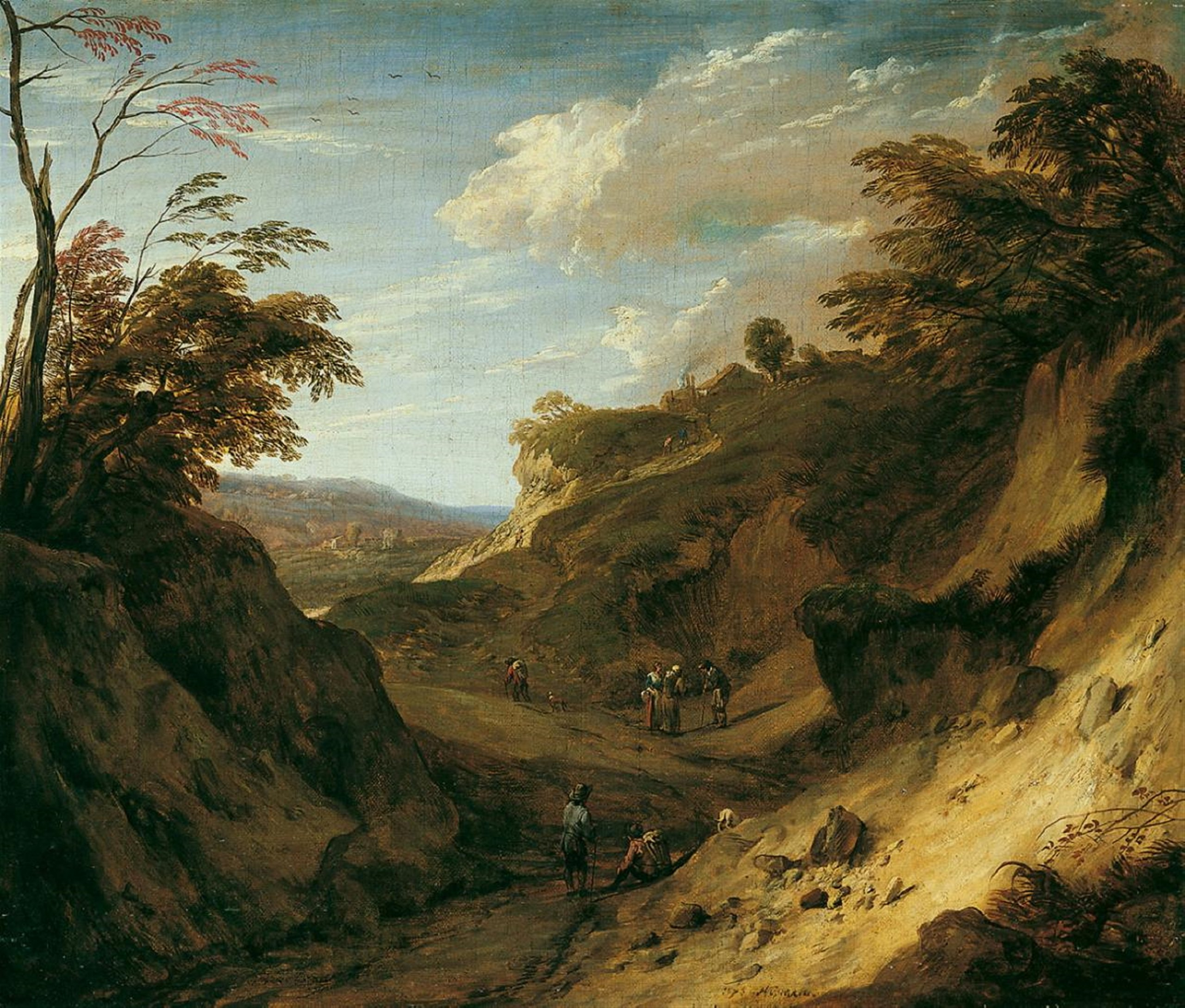
Hilly forest landscape

Upon the early death of his parents, his guardian sent him to study under the landscape painter Gaspar de Witte. After completing his studies with de Witte, Cornelis Huysmans moved to Brussels to continue his studies. He set up permanent residence in Brussels between 1675 and 1682 although he continued to visit his hometown Antwerp. He may have been a pupil or at least worked as an assistant in the studio of Jacques d'Arthois in Brussels. Huysmans worked for d'Arthois and drew landscapes from the Brussels area for two years. Around 1675 he did the same in the Meuse valley near Dinant and Namur. In 1675 he was admitted as an independent master of the Guild of Saint Luke in Brussels. During a stay in Antwerp in 1681 the artist declared that he was at the time living in Brussels.

The following year Huysmans moved to Mechelen. Here he married on 26 January 1682 Maria Anna Scheppers. The couple had two sons and one daughter. His son Pieter Balthasar Huysmans, who was born on 7 January 1684, was trained by his father but died young in 1706. From about 1686 to 1688, Cornelis Huysmans stayed in London where he appears to have enjoyed the patronage of prominent members of society. He created several large format landscapes for the London market.

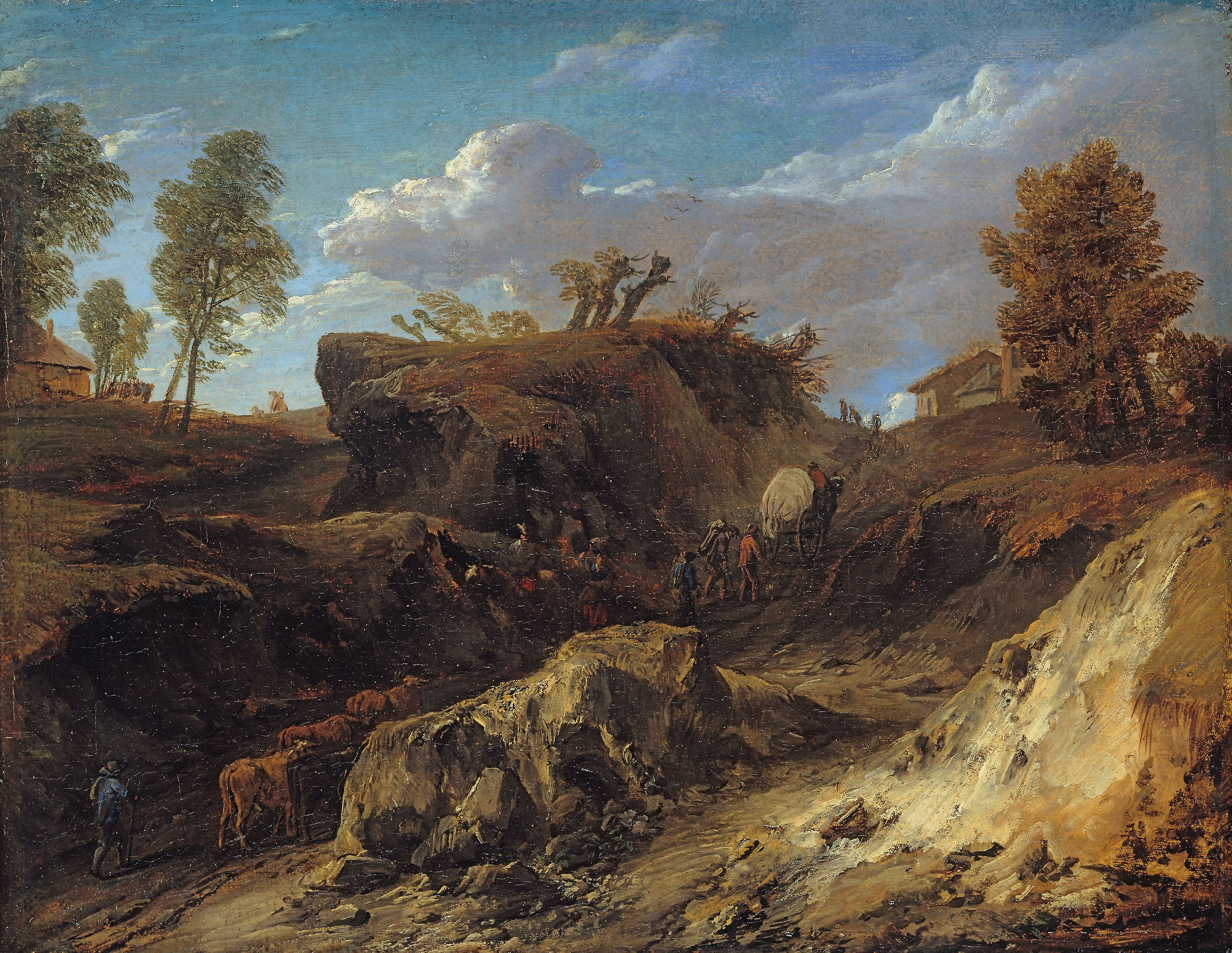
The hollow road

In 1688 Huysmans signed an agreement with the painters' guild of Mechelen, which allowed him to work as a painter in the city. He had to pay the guild 24 guilders and 14 stuivers for the privilege. In Mechelen Huysmans created the large-scale altarpiece The Road to Emmaus for the local Onze-Lieve-Vrouw-over-de-Dijle church in 1690. It is still in situ. Possibly he later ran into some problems with the painters' guild in Mechelen as he moved back to Antwerp, where he was admitted as a master in the local Guild of St Luke in the guild year 1706–7. He worked in Antwerp until 1716, the year in which he returned to Mechelen where he continued to work until his death in 1727.

He was the first teacher of his younger brother Jan Baptist (1654–1716), who also became a landscape painter, as well as of his son Pieter Balthasar. In Mechelen Augustus-Casimir Redel (August Casimir Redel or Ridel) and Jean Edmond Turner were his pupils.

== Work ==
Cornelis Huysmans is mainly known for his landscape works although he also created some religious and history paintings. He worked with Jacques d'Arthois in Brussels, and in 1674 with Adam Frans van der Meulen in Maastricht.

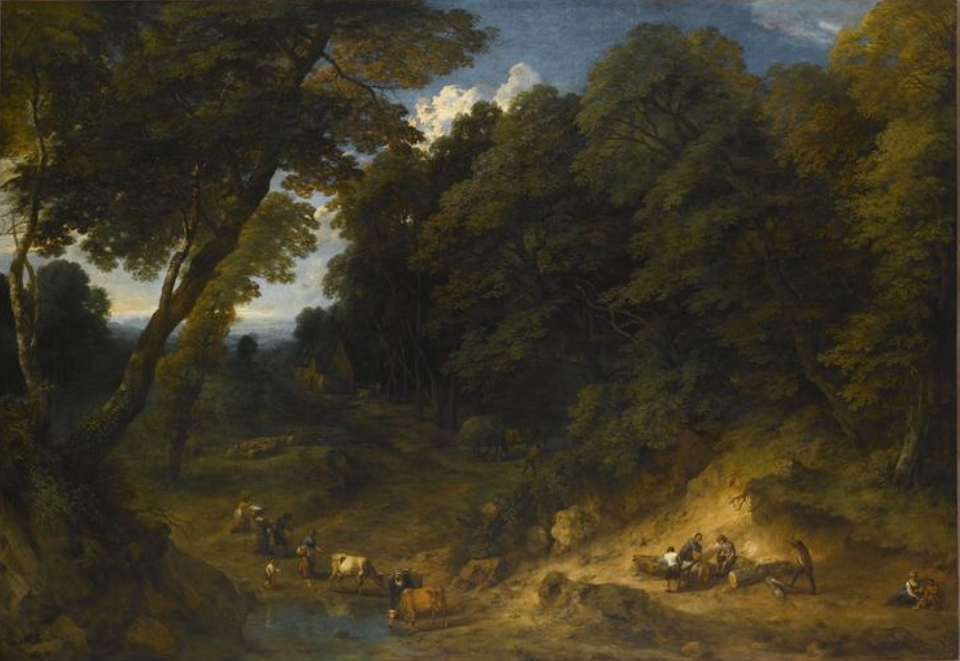
Forest edge with loggers

Huysmans' landscapes are characterised by their intensive and precise observations of nature, especially in his rendering of forests and trees. While there is some similarity with the Arcadian works of Poussin with their classical architecture, the major influence on the artist was Jacques d'Arthois. His highly decorative compositions often depict the edge of a forest with a sandy bank in the foreground. He often used a clearing to create a diagonal in his compositions. He used contrasts between colours and between the sharp light falling on roads and the dark hues of the tree trunks and foliage casting shadows to create a dramatic effect. His works were executed in bold brushstrokes. His use of similar compositional devices in his landscapes creates the impression of uniformity between his works.

Unlike Jacques d'Arthois, Huysmans bathed his landscapes in a warm, Italian light. The decidedly Mediterranean appearance was further emphasized through his choice of vegetation and architecture, which had a southern flavour. Huysmans thus succeeded in giving his landscapes an air of grandeur.

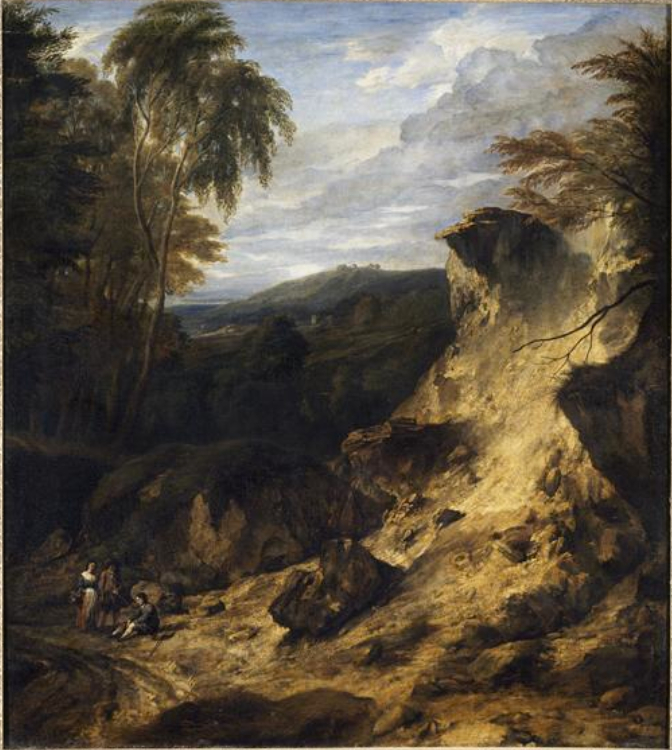
Landscape with steep hill

His works are in the collections of various museums including the Louvre in Paris (eight works), the Hermitage Museum in St. Petersburg, the Art Institute of Chicago, the Gemäldegalerie Alte Meister in Dresden, the National Gallery of Scotland in Edinburgh, the Musée Fabre in Montpellier, the Museum of modern art André Malraux - MuMa in Le Havre, the Royal Museum of Fine Arts in Antwerp, the Musée des beaux-arts de Valenciennes and others.
