= Coignet =

Coignet may refer to:

- Edmond Coignet (1856–1915), French engineer and entrepreneur
- François Coignet (1814–1888), French industrialist and designer of the Port Said Lighthouse
  - Coignet Stone Company Building, NYC, seat of company using F. Coignet's method to produce concrete blocks
- Gillis Coignet (c.1542–1599), Dutch and Flemish painter
- Gillis II Coignet (1586–after 1641), Flemish painter
- Horace Coignet (1735–1821), French composer
- Jean Francisque Coignet (1835–1902), French mining engineer and government advisor in Bakumatsu and Meiji period Japan
- Jean-Roch Coignet (1776–1865), French soldier
- Jules Coignet (1798–1860), French landscape painter
- Matthieu Coignet (c. 1514–1586), French lawyer, ambassador, landowner, and author
- Michiel Coignet (1549–1623), Flemish engineer, cosmographer, mathematician, and manufacturer of scientific instruments
- Michiel II Coignet (1618–c.1663), Flemish painter
