= Cognet =

Cognet may refer to:

- Cognet, Isère, a town in France
- CogNet, an online resource for cognitive sciences developed by MIT Press
- Cognet Inc., a telecommunications company acquired by Intel
- Christophe Cognet, French film director and documentary filmmaker

== See also ==
- Cognat, a surname
- Coignet, a surname
- Cognetti (disambiguation)
- Cognetics (disambiguation)
