= St John the Evangelist at Patmos =

Painting by Paul Bril

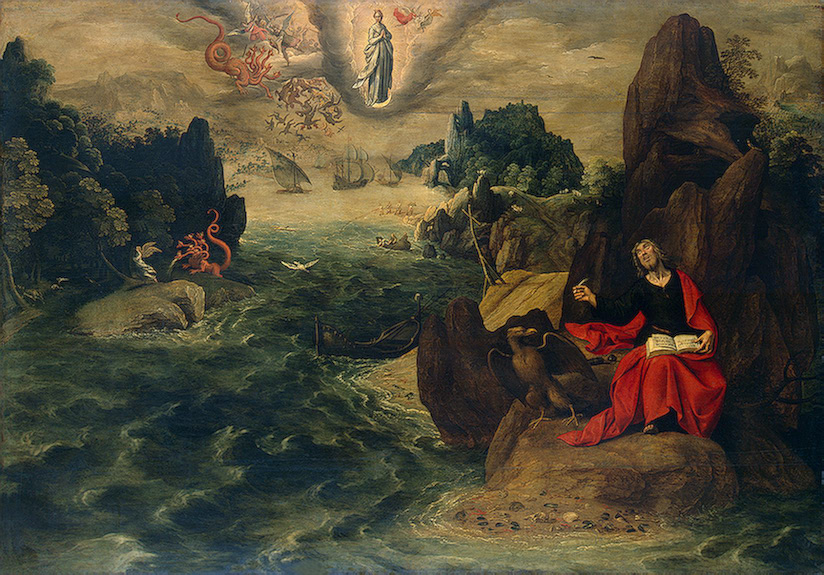
- Artist: Tobias Verhaecht; Gillis Coignet
- Year: 1598
- Catalogue: ГЭ-8694
- Medium: Oil on panel
- Dimensions: 133 cm × 191.5 cm (52.3 in × 75.3 in)
- Location: Hermitage Museum, Saint Petersburg

St John the Evangelist at Patmos is an oil-on-panel painting by Flemish painters Tobias Verhaecht and Gillis Coignet. The painting was completed in 1598, and is now in the Hermitage Museum in Saint Petersburg.

== Painting ==
According to legend, Saint John was exiled to Patmos during the persecutions under Emperor Domitian. There, he is thought to have written the Book of Revelation, although some attribute the authorship of Revelation to another man, called John the Presbyter, or to other writers of the late first century AD. In the painting, John is depicted sitting on a rock by the sea, in the process of writing the Book of Revelation. Next to him there sits an eagle, John's commonest attribute along with a book or scroll.

== Provenance ==
The painting entered the Hermitage Museum in 1934. It was moved there from the Leningrad branch of the Soviet Writers' Union. The painting was formerly in the collection of P.V. Delarov.

== Bibliography ==
- A. E. Krol, K. M. Semenova (red), Musée de l'Ermitage. Peinture de l"Europe occidentale, Leningrad (Hermitage) 1981, dl. II, p. 42
