= Church of San Bartolomé (Logroño) =

- Iglesia de San Bartolomé (Spanish)
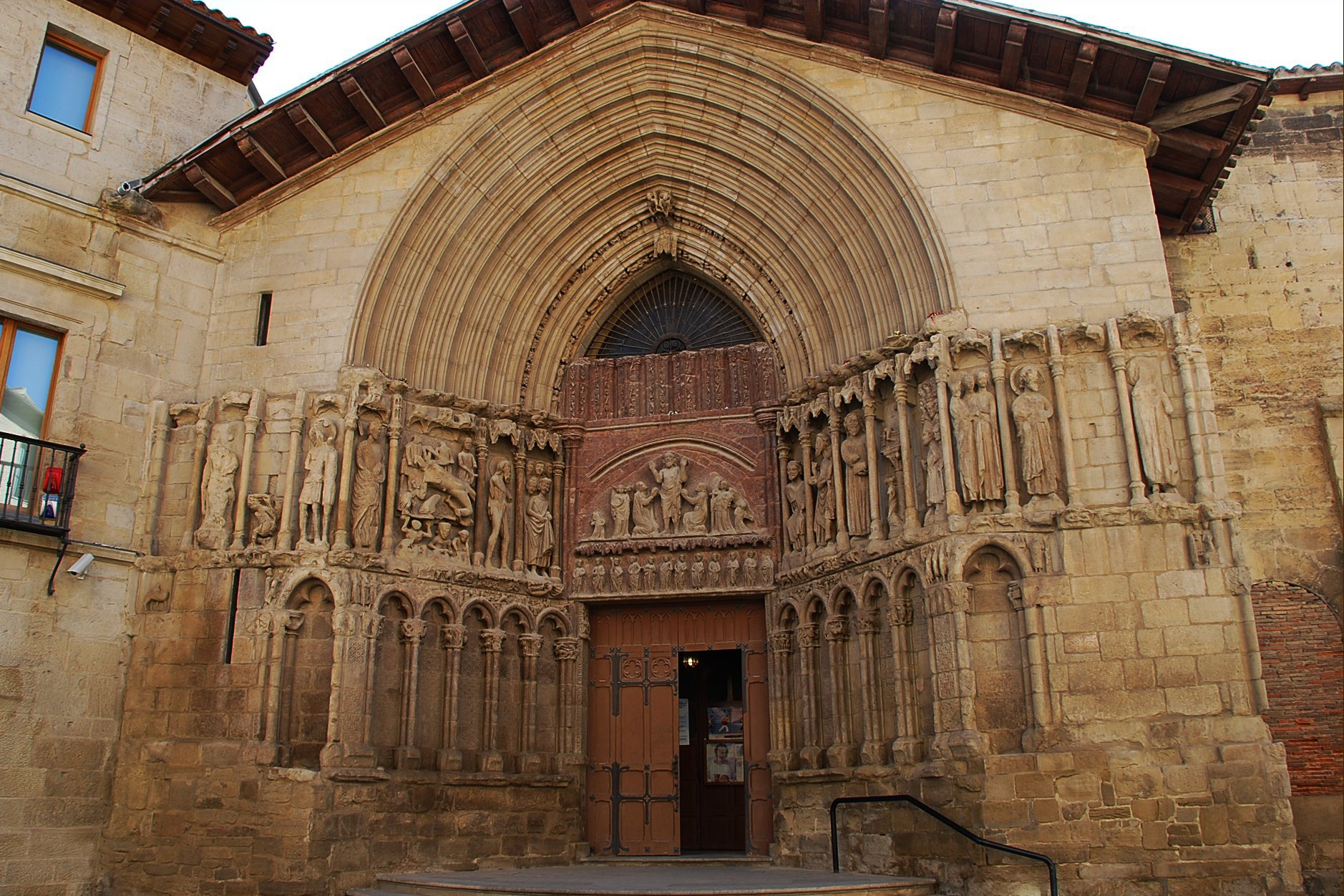

- Location within Spain
- 42.46716°N 2.443664°W
- Location: Logroño, Spain

Spanish Cultural Heritage
- Official name: Iglesia de San Bartolomé
- Type: Non-movable
- Criteria: Monument
- Designated: 1866
- Reference no.: RI-51-0000006

The Church of San Bartolomé (Spanish: Iglesia de San Bartolomé) is the oldest church of Logroño, Spain. Its construction dates back to the 12th century, so partly preserves Romanesque style in the head and in the initial part of the tower, and continues during the 13th century, with the Gothic style development, building the magnificent arched portal, which contains some Romanesque sculptures that tell the life of saint Bartholomew and other Bible passages.

It has been protected by a heritage listing (currently Bien de Interés Cultural) since 1866. The Church of San Bartholomé is located in the Landmark No. 9 on the Way of St. James, a World Heritage Site. It is located 612 km from Santiago de Compostela.

== Scenes from the porch ==
The scenes of the portal consist of 19 vignettes. Starting at the far right, in the first scene is San Bartolomé saving king Polemon's lunatic daughter, three tables, a man (1), a woman (2) and the Saint (3), the fourth is empty but could have been Polemón. In the second is the saint in a painting (5) and a group of maidens in another (6), who are evangelizing in court. In the third, the Saint is expelling the demon from the pagan idols, and converting the rest, angering some priests. This part consists in the following tables: the priests (7), the idol Berith on a column and praying under (8) and the Saint with a box in hand expelling the devil (9). In the following two tables (10 and 11) the Saint is led by a soldier to the king Astyages. On the far left might have been some scene, which may have been destroyed to build the Monesterio Palace. The twelfth box is empty. In tables 13-16 Bartholomew defeats the idol Baldach, who Astyages loves and making command him flogging for his anger, but orders pulling him to pieces because it seems insufficient punishment. We can see him tied by the four limbs being skinned on a table holding by three female figures: lust, vanity and laziness. Tables 18 and 19 show San Bartolomé preaching with his own skin over his shoulder.

The tympanum of Cristo Redentor of the cover is moved down because in the 16th century stonemason Pedro de Acha reformed the chorus and makes a small window in order to illuminate the place. From this reform is also created the Renaissance arch behind this choir.

== Structure ==
The basilica has three naves separated by octagonal pillars covered with a groin vault, highlighting the Romanesque crossing and apse, because there is not any altarpiece but it had a major altarpiece in its day, 18th-century style, painted in white and gold with great resemblance with the Holy Martyrs of Calahorra.

=== Tower ===
During the fifteen days which Logroño resisted the siege of the French army in 1521, the tower was hit by enemy artillery suffering damage, because it is near the defensive walls of the city, and guarded the Herbentia gate, near the old town hall. Years later it was rebuilt in brick, with Mudejar style influences from Aragón. During the First Carlist War an optical telegraph station was located in the tower. Spain was spanned by an extensive semaphore telegraph network in the 1840s and 1850s.

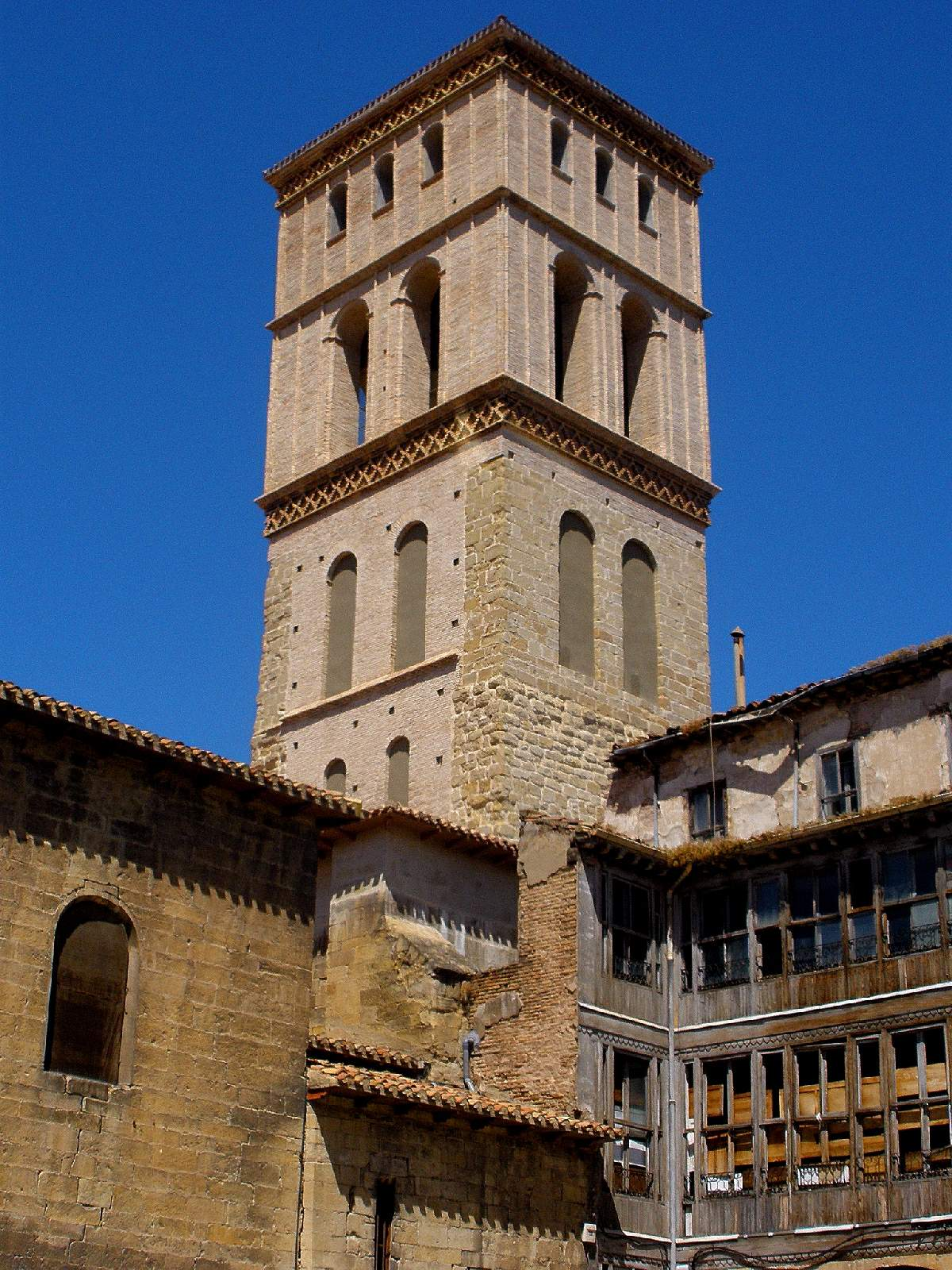
Mudejar tower

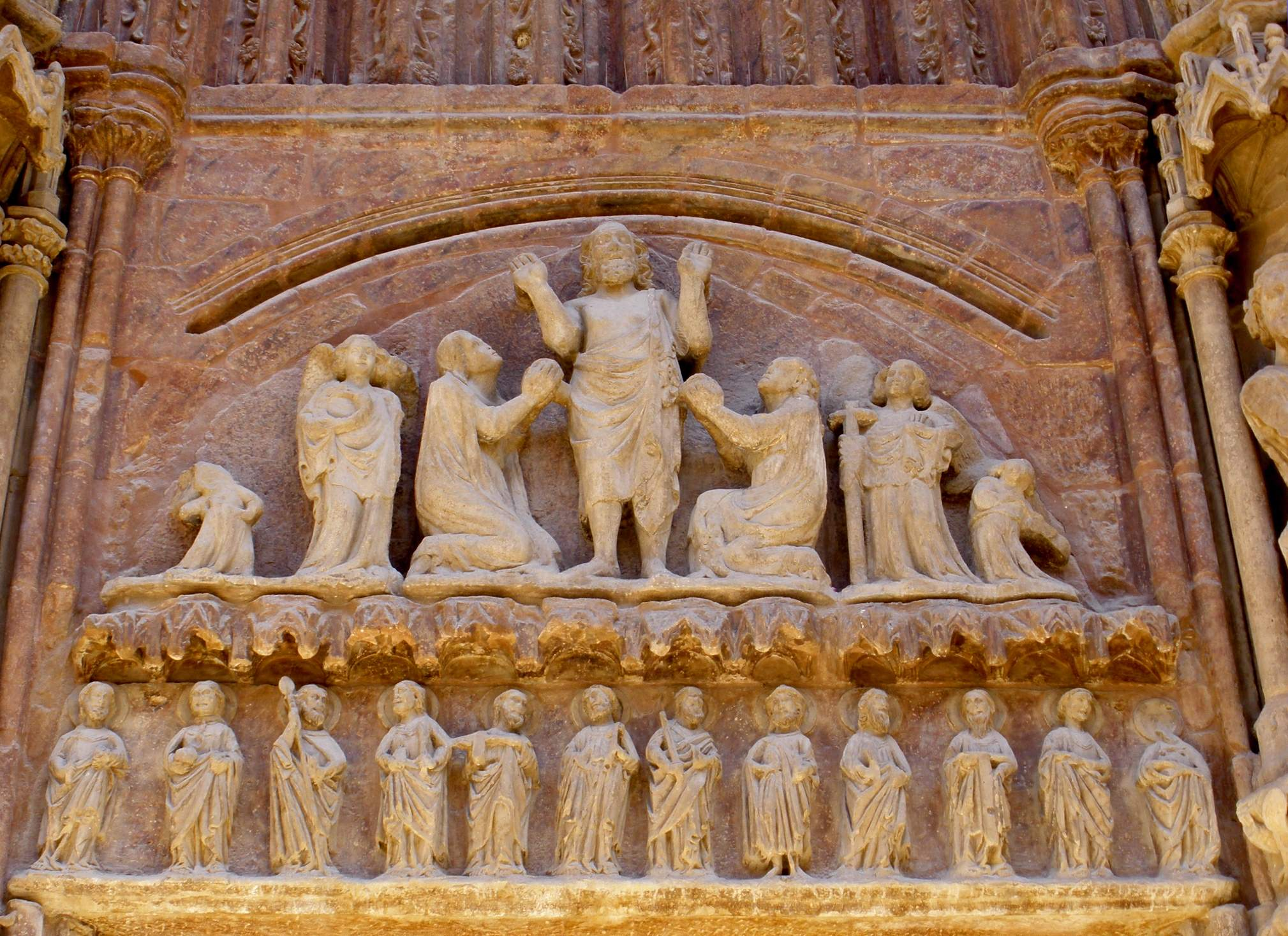
Tympanum of the porch

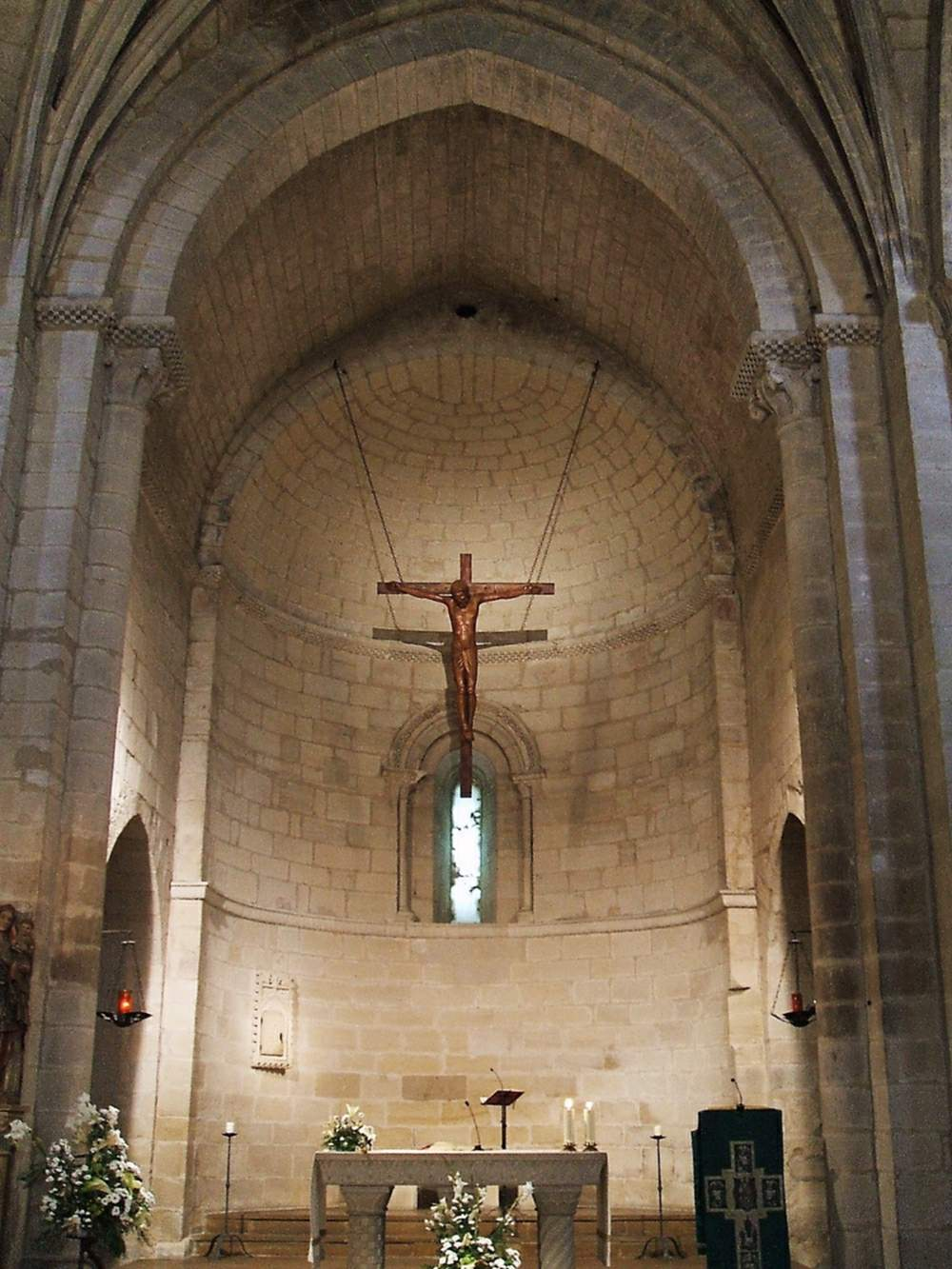
Romanesque apse

== Secularisation and surroundings ==
As a result of the Ecclesiastical confiscations of Mendizábal in the 19th century, the building was used as a warehouse for wood and coal. Furthermore, disappeared all the works of art that could have except a carved stone Gothic coffins. It had other uses as military hospital, park or workshop. During mid-19th century was thought to demolish stone building in order to build a theater in the place that was the episcopal palace (currently in this place is located the food market).

Next to the church and even attached to it were built several buildings, some of which have been restored or demolished so now part of the apse is seen from the outside. Among those is the Palace of the Marquises of Monesterio, dating from 1751 and it was owned by the Marquis of Monesterio and Lapilla. Over the years it housed institutions like the Catholic Circle of Workers, schools and the cinema of the Father Marin and after years without any use, has been renovated and reused as official building.

== See also ==
- Co-Cathedral of Logroño
- Church of Santa María de Palacio (Logroño)
