= Co-Cathedral of Logroño =

Cathedral in Logroño, Spain

Co-cathedral of Santa María de la Redonda
- Concatedral de Santa María de la Redonda (Spanish)
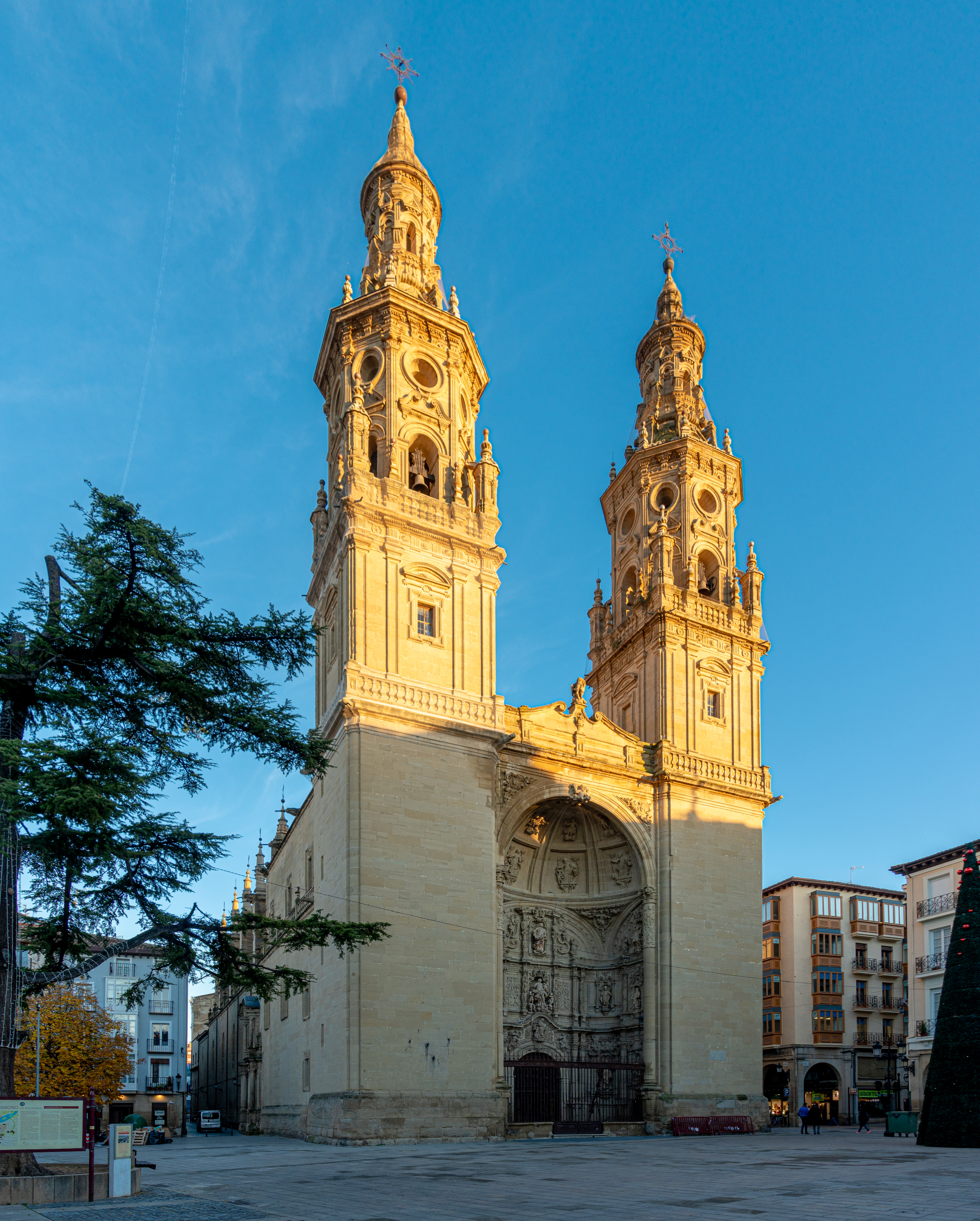

- Location within Spain
- 42.46652°N 2.445526°W
- Location: Logroño, Spain

Site notes
- Governing body: Roman Catholic Church

Spanish Cultural Heritage
- Official name: Concatedral de Santa María de la Redonda
- Type: Non-movable
- Criteria: Monument
- Designated: 1931
- Reference no.: RI-51-0000701

The Co-cathedral of Santa María de la Redonda (Spanish: Concatedral de Santa María de la Redonda) is a co-cathedral located in Logroño, in La Rioja, Spain.

The name "redonda" refers to the rounded shape of an earlier church on the site. It had the status of collegiate church from the 15th century when Logrono became a city. The present building was raised to the rank of cathedral in the 20th century. It belongs to the Roman Catholic Diocese of Calahorra y La Calzada-Logroño, which has two other cathedrals.

The church has two elaborately decorated towers, each containing a set of bells. The sidewall of the church has a clock split into three faces : one each for the hour, minute and second. The entrance to the church is set in an alcove filled with Christian sculptures, protected by high iron gates and netting to prevent people or birds entering. The towers are similarly netted but the famous storks which inhabit Logroño can still nest on the highest ledges.

== The Flemish panels by Gillis Coignet ==
Gillis Coignet, born in 1535 in Antwerp and died in 1599 in Hamburg, painted those panels in Antwerp in 1584, according to the wooden footnote of the painting Anunciation. The panels arrived at this church from the chapel of the Lordship of Somalo near Nájera. Their owners acquired them in Paris at the beginning of the 20th century, and placed them in the chappel.

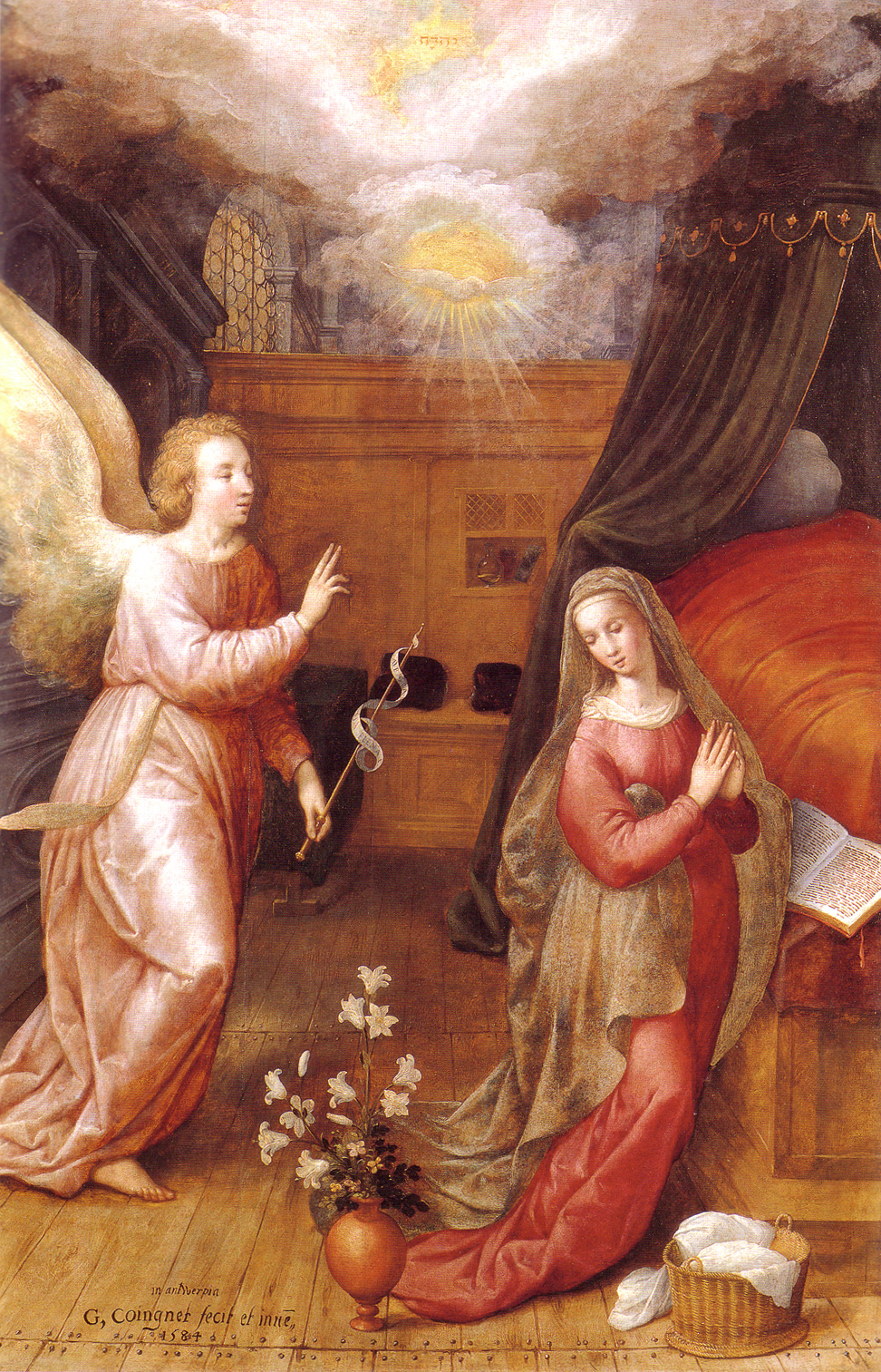
Annunciation

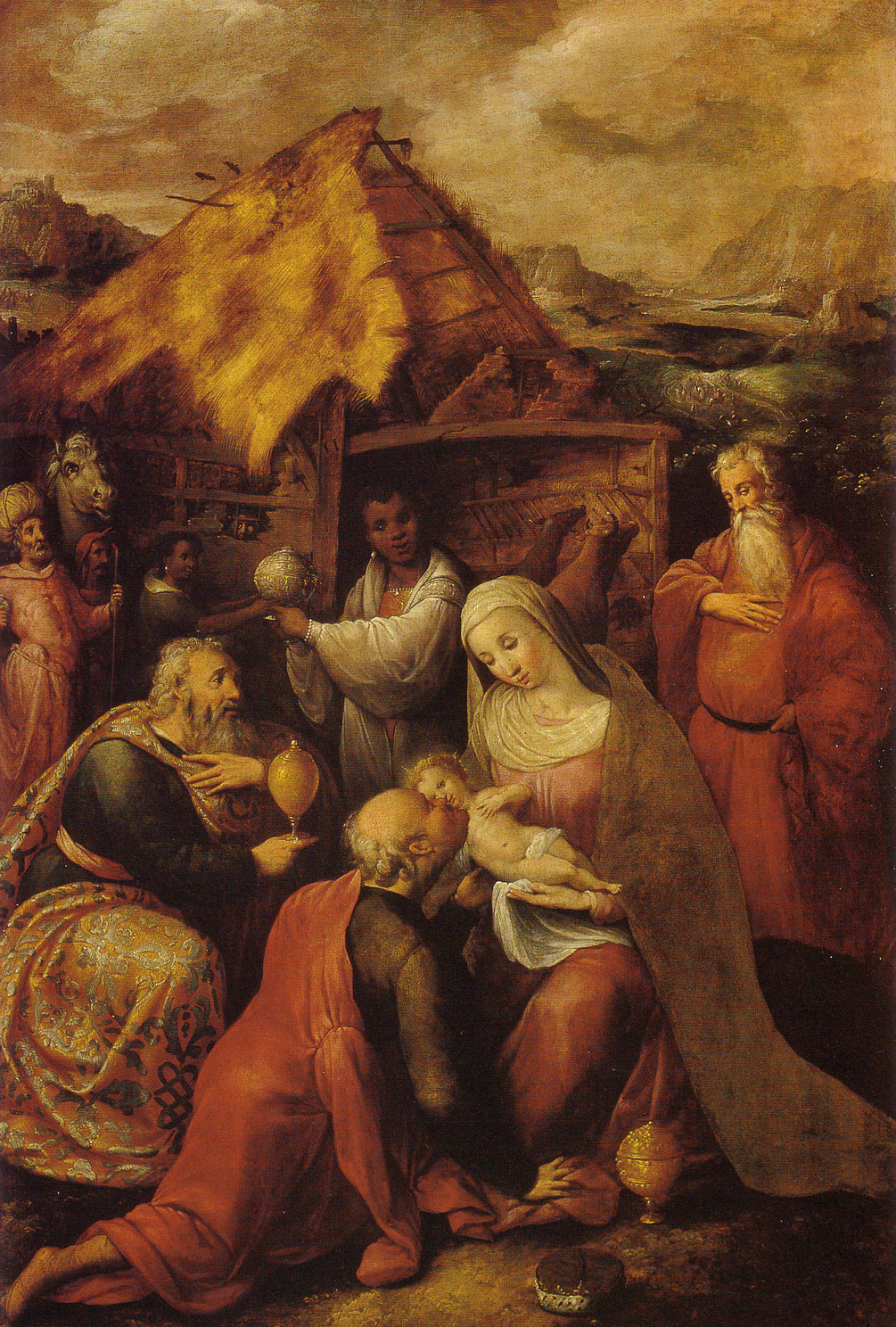
Epiphany

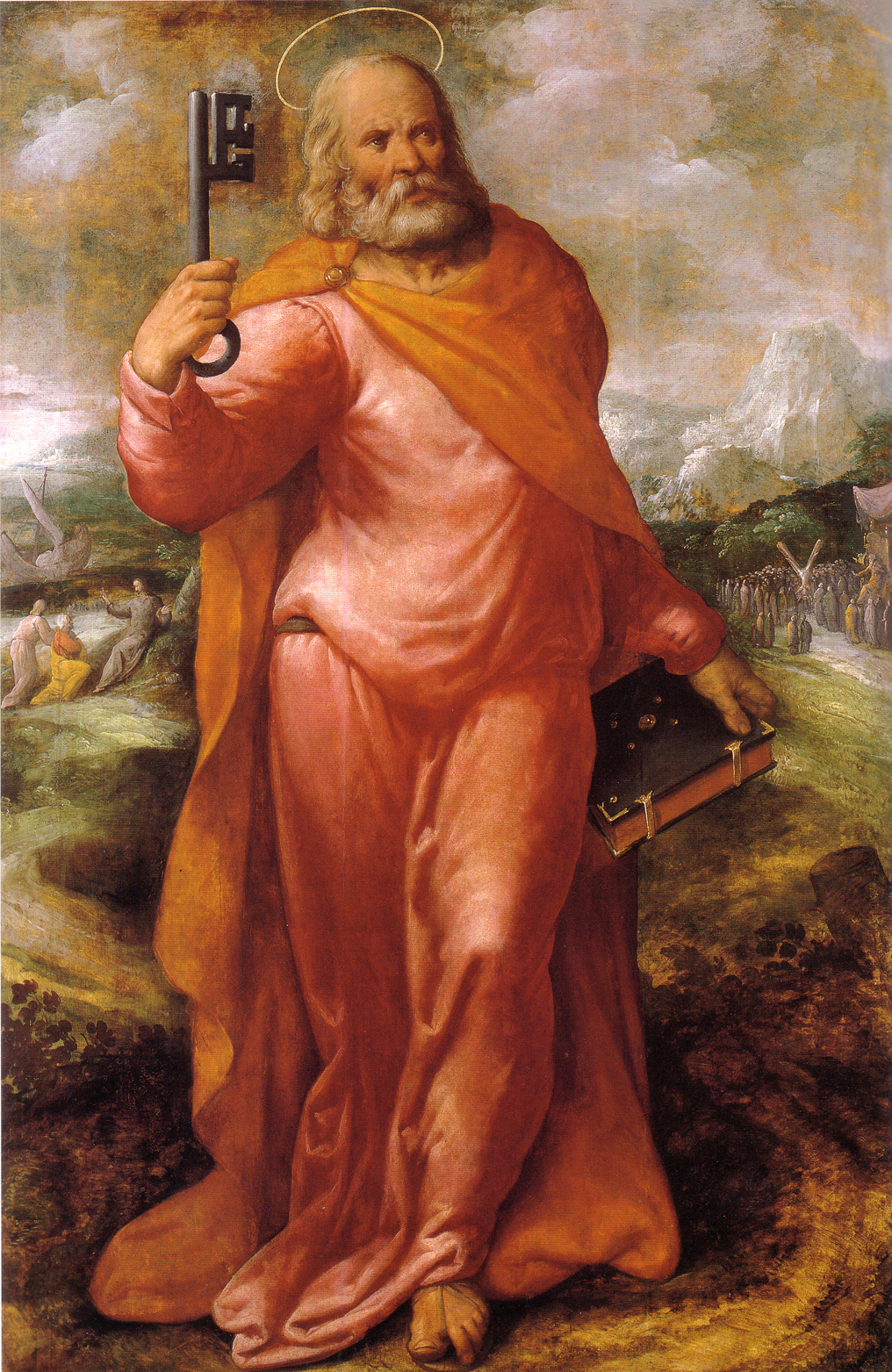
Saint Peter

== Conservation ==
It has been protected by a heritage listing (currently Bien de Interés Cultural) since 1931.

== See also ==
- Church of San Bartolomé (Logroño)
- Church of Santa María de Palacio (Logroño)
