= Cognat =

Cognat is a surname. Notable people with the surname include:

- André Cognat (1938–2021), France-born French Guiana tribal chief
- Edgard Cognat (1919–1994), Brazilian painter and sculptor
- Timothé Cognat (born 1998), French footballer

== See also ==
- Cognet (disambiguation)
