= Church of Santa María de Palacio (Logroño) =

- Iglesia de Santa María de Palacio (Spanish)
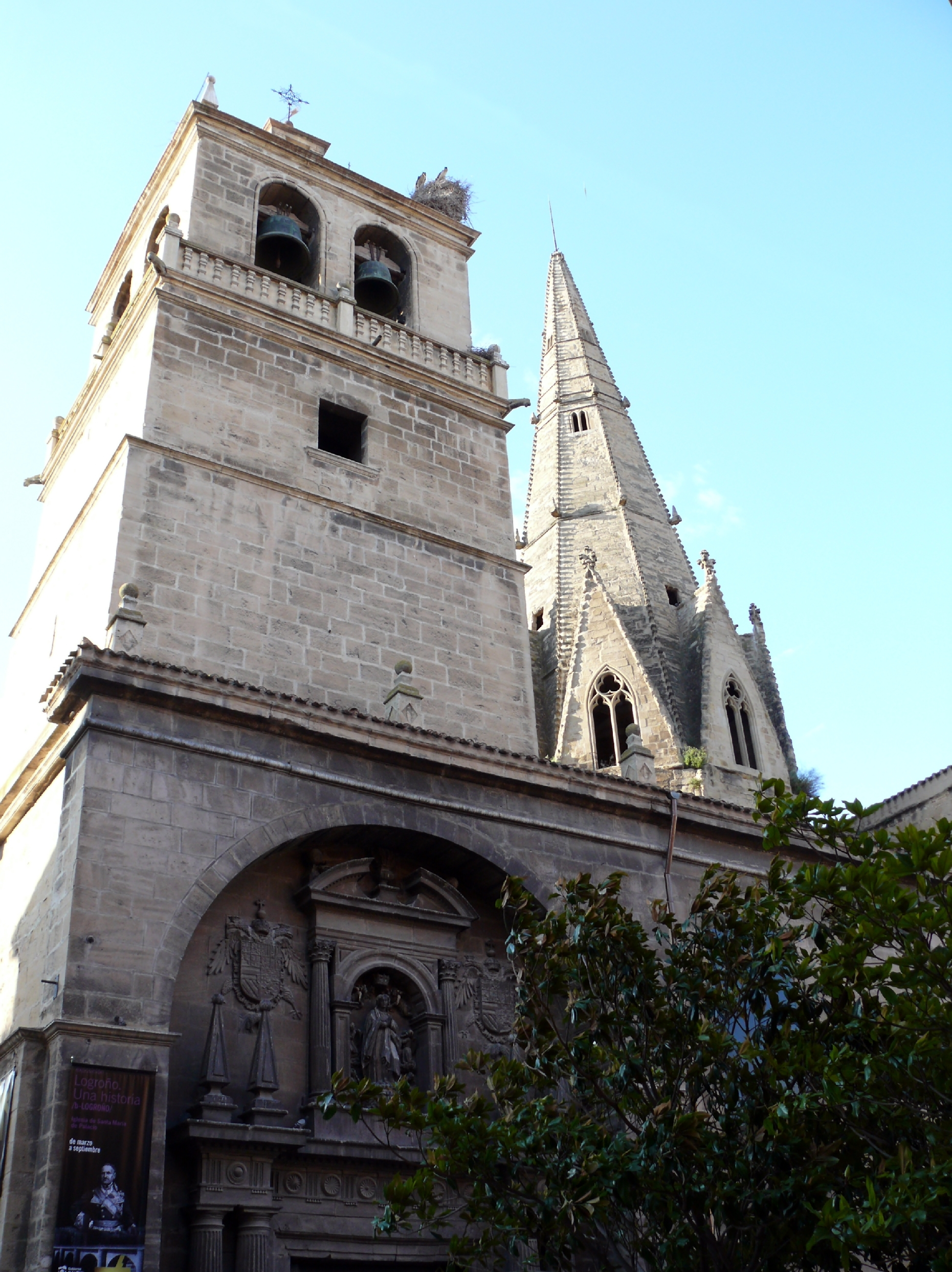

- Location within Spain
- 42.46801°N 2.444405°W
- Location: Logroño, Spain

Spanish Cultural Heritage
- Official name: Iglesia de Santa María de Palacio
- Type: Non-movable
- Criteria: Monument
- Designated: 1943
- Reference no.: RI-51-0001140

The Church of Santa María de Palacio (Spanish: Iglesia de Santa María de Palacio) is a medieval church in the Old Town of Logroño, Spain. It is notable for its unusual lantern tower topped with a spire and its Mannerist reredos. It was declared Bien de Interés Cultural, a National Monument, in 1943.

== Origin and history ==
Located directly on the main pilgrimage route of the Camino de Santiago, Santa María de Palacio has its origins in a medieval royal palace, which stood around the site of the present church and cloister. The palace had earlier served as a residence of the kings of Navarre in Logroño and a centre of royal authority in the region, later captured by the Crown of Castile and Leon in 1076 under Alfonso VI.Attached to it was a church known as Santa María la Vieja (on the site of what is now the chapel of Santa María la Antigua in the cloister) which was dedicated to the Nativity of the Virgin together with a small religious house responsible for ministering to pilgrims.

During the mid 13th century, King of Galicia, Castile and León and Emperor of All Spain, Alfonso VII, donated the palace with its chapel and religious community to Canon Giralde, an envoy of the Grand Prior of the Order of Canons Regular of the Holy Sepulchre. This was a new religious order at the time, having been founded at Jerusalem c. 1114, which was then under the control of the Crusader states. Giralde had come to Spain to establish new priories for his order, and Logroño was the first such house in the Kingdom of Castile. During the second half of the 13th century a larger Romanesque church began to be constructed to the south of the palace chapel. Known as Santa María la Nueva and dedicated to the Assumption of the Virgin it served as the parish church, while the older chapel of Santa María la Vieja remained the conventual chapel of the priory. This was the first stage of construction of the present Santa María de Palacio. The establishment of this priory formed part of a wider scheme of building churches and endowing religious communities along the Camino de Santiago. It is thanks to Alfonso VII that the church bears the title of Imperial. Construction continued in the new Gothic style during the 13th century, and the church’s characteristic octagonal lantern tower and spire date from this phase. This early structure was described as transitional Romanesque–Gothic in the 1943 listing.

The Order of Canons Regular of the Holy Sepulchre left Logroño sometime in the 15th century, and in 1518 a papal bull was granted, making Santa María de Palacio a collegiate church together with Santa María de la Redonda. In 1520, Charles V, Holy Roman Emperor visited the church as King of Spain to swear an oath to preserve the rights of the city of Logroño. This became the established custom of Spanish monarchs on their first visit to Logroño after their accession.

During the 16th century, the church was extended considerably eastwards, and the ancient chapel of Santa María la Vieja was also demolished and enlarged. In the 18th century, the interior was remodelled along Baroque lines to avoid the collapse of the needle, obscuring the interior view of the lantern tower.

The building was granted national monument status by decree of General Franco on 27 September 1943.

== Architecture ==
Santa María de Palacio is a basilical structure, composed of three naves of three bays each, a large vaulted crossing, and a triple apsidal eastern termination. The structure is best known for its spire-surmounted lantern tower, one of two towers on the church, the other being a Baroque bell tower at the south-eastern corner of the structure. The complex also includes a cloister, chapter house, sacristy, choir, and the adjoining Chapel of Our Lady of Antigua.The structure is a palimpsest of the Romanesque transitional Gothic, Late and Post Gothic and Baroque architectural styles which has evolved over eight centuries.

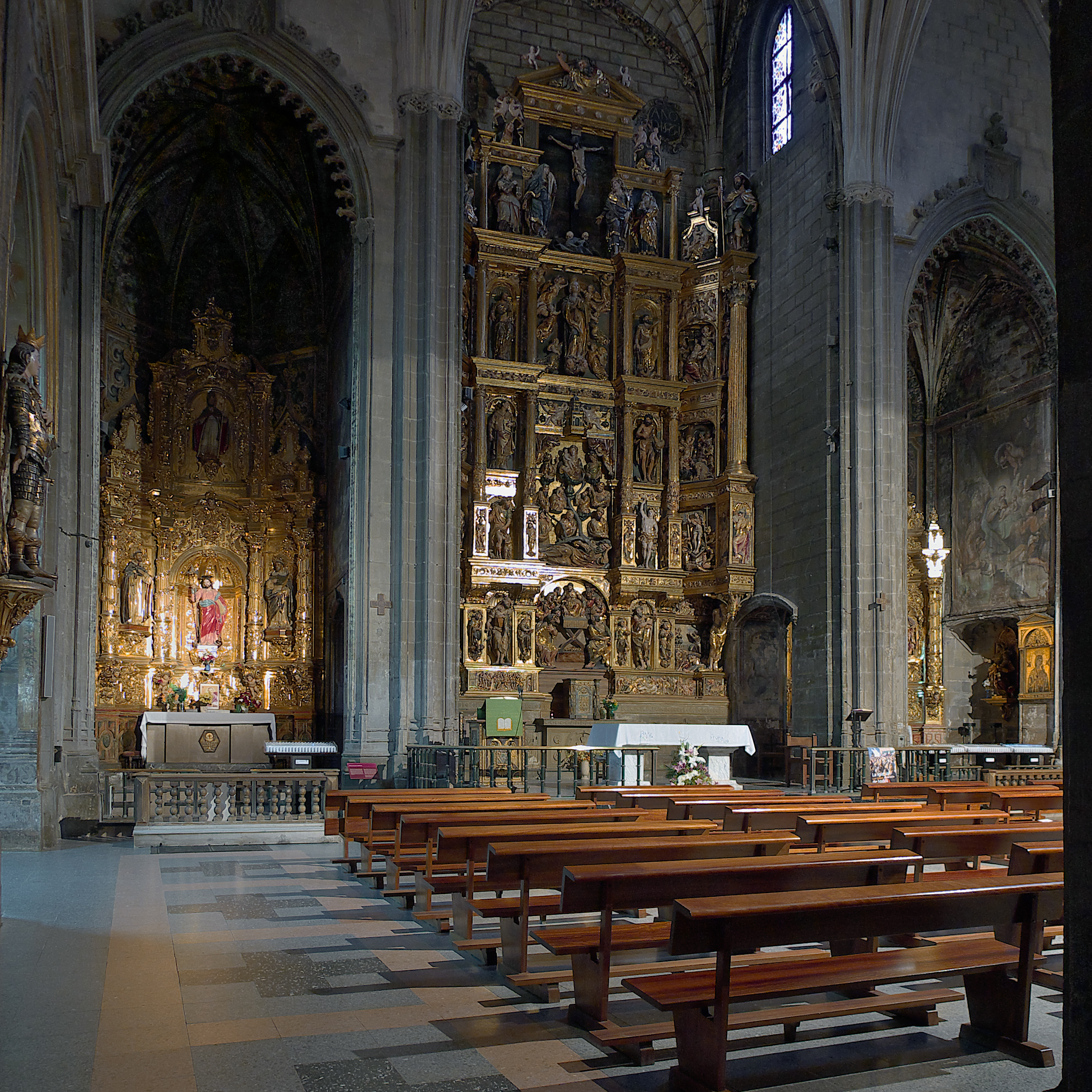
The high altar and flanking chapels.

=== Phases of construction ===
The oldest surviving fabric belongs to the late twelfth and early thirteenth centuries and consists principally of the three western bays of the nave. Sometime during the 14th or 15th century the gothic ribbed vaulting of the naves was constructed and the crossing was crowned by the octagonal lantern tower surmounted externally by the church’s celebrated Gothic spire (aguja). This distinctive structure, more reminiscent of French and English ecclesiastical architecture, has been thought to echo both the rotunda of the Church of the Holy Sepulchre in Jerusalem and an imperial crown. It is one of the principal landmarks of Logroño.

During the sixteenth century, the east end was rebuilt and enlarged, and the nave was extended to include what had been the lantern crossing of the 13th-century church. The new crossing consists of clustered piers and pointed arches, which carry a tierceron vault.

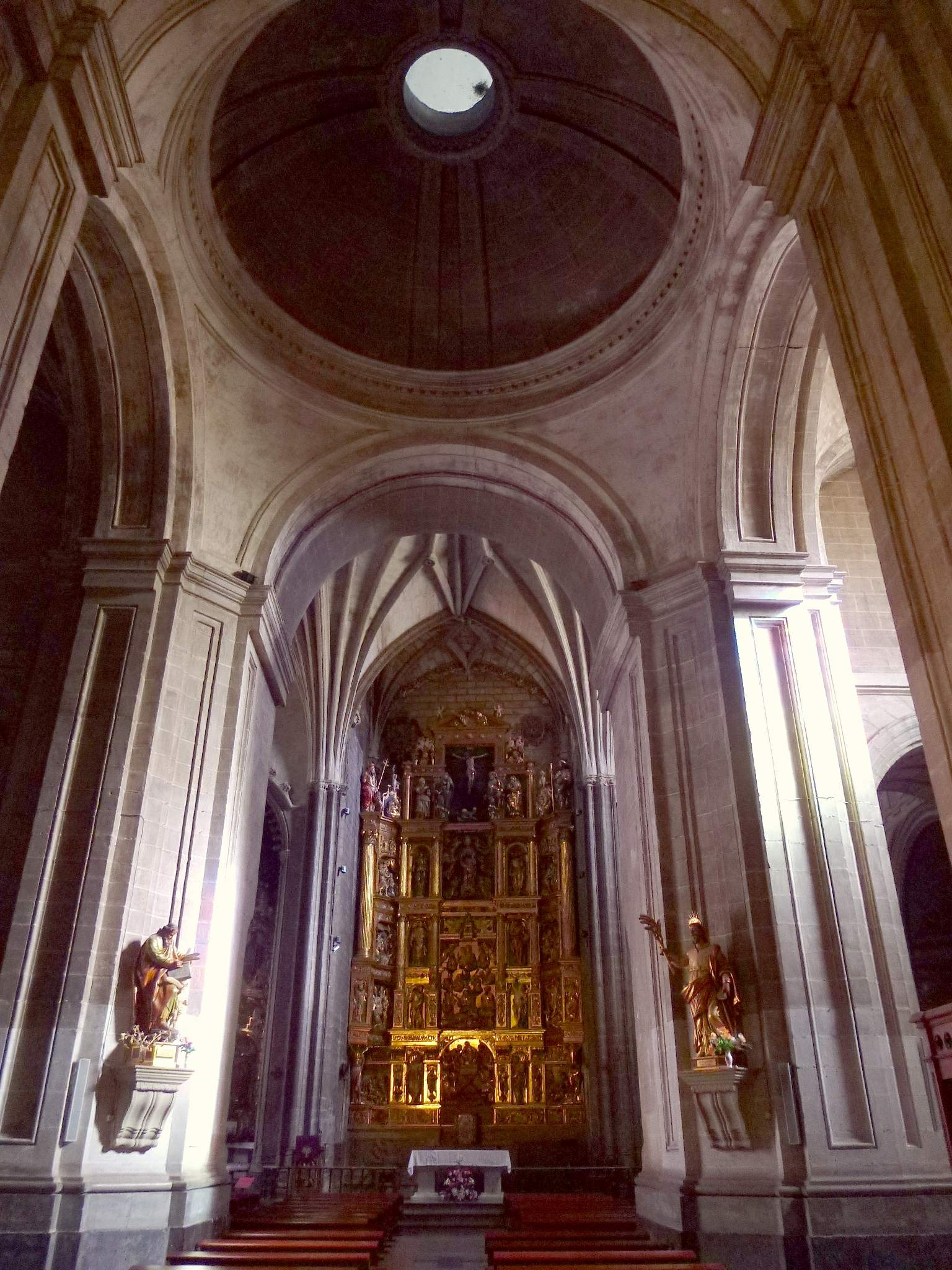
The 18th century done which buttresses the lantern tower in the nave

In the eighteenth century, extensive structural works were undertaken to counteract the outward thrust of the great Gothic spire. These included the construction of the present interior dome beneath the lantern, the addition of reinforcing arches and angular piers, and the rebuilding of the chapels flanking the crossing. Although these interventions altered the medieval interior, they ensured the survival of the church’s most distinctive feature.

=== The spire (Aguja) ===
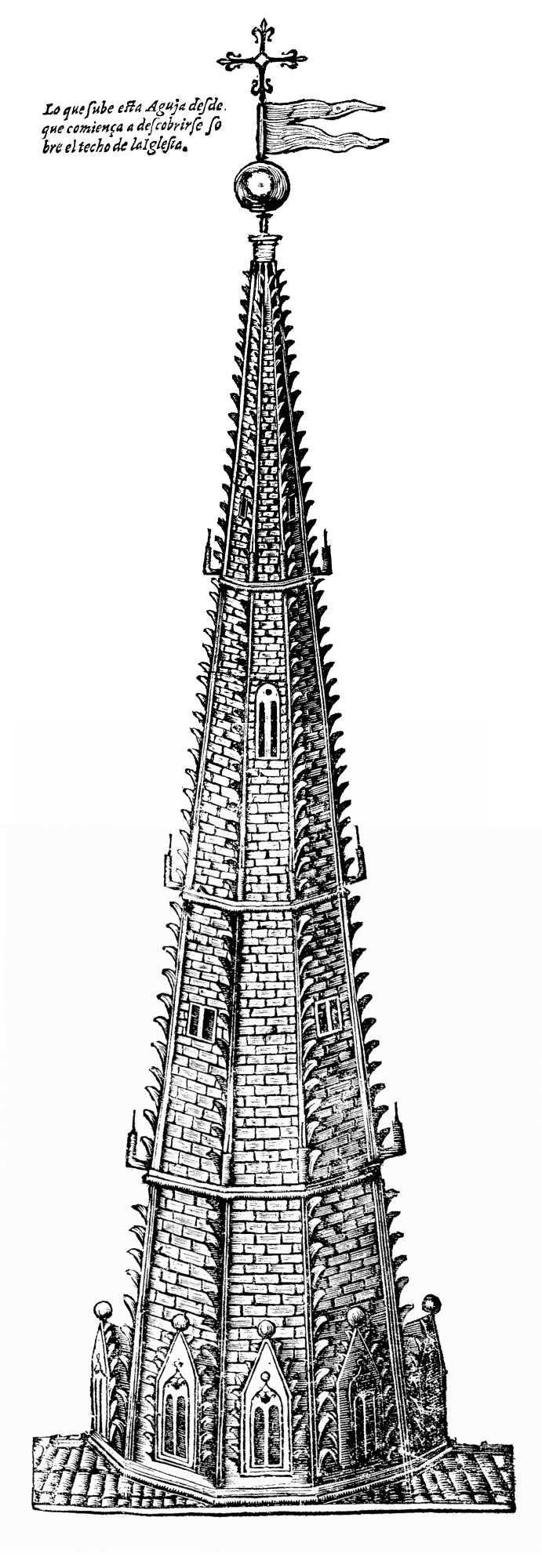
A 1633 engraving of the lantern tower spire of Santa María de Palacio

The church is renowned for its extraordinary Gothic spire-topped lantern tower, constructed in the thirteenth century. Rising from its octagonal lantern, carried on squinches above what was the crossing (prior to the eastward extension of the church in the 16th century), the spire takes the form of an elegant eight-sided pyramid divided into several stages by moulded string courses. Its lower stage is articulated by projecting dormer-like structures pierced with pointed traceried windows, while the external angles are enriched with crockets and pinnacles. By the seventeenth century, the weight and lateral thrust of the structure had caused serious instability, and demolition was even considered. Instead, a major programme of reinforcement was undertaken during the eighteenth century, preserving the medieval spire while obscuring the interior view of the lantern tower with a supporting dome. An oculus in the top of the dome admits a little of the light from the lantern.

=== Exterior ===
The present principal entrance occupies the south side of the church near the western end of the south aisle. Designed by Juan de la Riba and completed in 1627, it is a relatively simple Baroque portal with a lintelled opening framed by columns and surmounted by a sculpture of Our Lady of the Assumption, flanked by the imperial coats of arms.

A second entrance on the north side of the cloister opens onto the Rúa Vieja and is surmounted by a statue of St John.

=== Bell Tower ===
The bell tower, designed by Juan de Acha and begun about 1550, stands beside the Gothic spire at the south-eastern corner of the building but remains lower than it despite the later addition of the belfry. The upper section is pierced by eight round-headed openings and is crowned by a small domed lantern.

=== Cloister ===
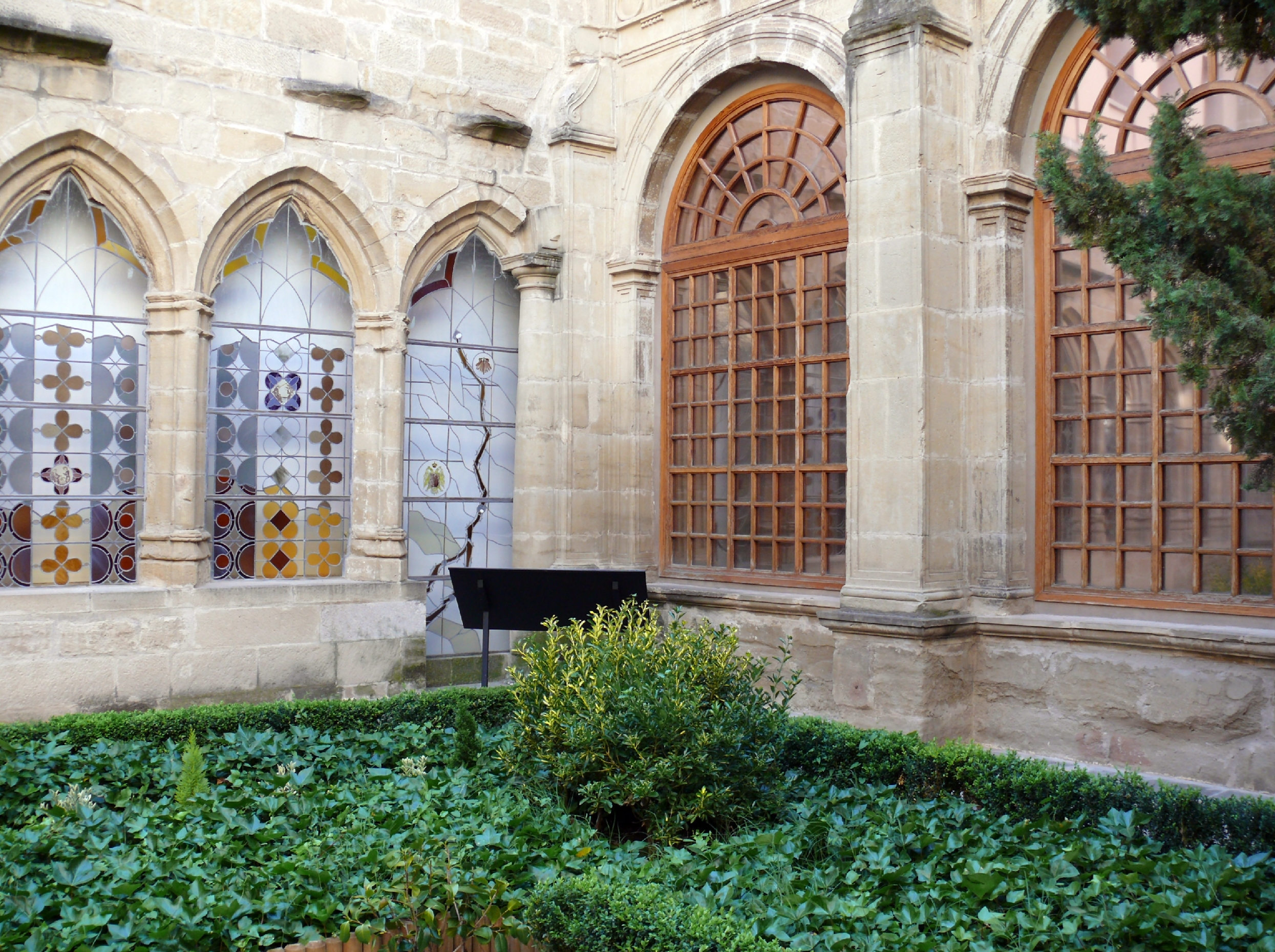
The cloister of Santa María de Palacio

The cloister was originally built in a plain Cistercian style. Only the western gallery survives from the medieval cloister, constructed in the 15th century; the remaining three sides were rebuilt in the seventeenth century.It is the only surviving cloister attached to a church in Logroño. It may be entered either from the north aisle of the church or through the adjoining Chapel of Our Lady of Antigua.

=== Chapel of Our Lady of Antigua ===
This chapel was constructed to replaced the site of the original palace chapel, which lay just to its west in what is now the cloister garth. The original structure was demolished in the 17th century during the reconstruction of the cloister and repositioned in its present location. It preserves the 12th or 13th century image of Our Lady of Antigua within a Baroque altarpiece. The Chapel contains the tomb of Juan de Vergara y Porres, prior of the order of the Holy Sepulchre.

=== Interior furnishings ===
The church contains one of the finest Mannerist altarpieces in La Rioja, executed in the mid-sixteenth century (see below). Among its other notable furnishings are the stone statue of Our Lady of the Palace, the Gothic image of Our Lady of the Ebro and a Flemish Immaculate Conception.

The choir dates from the late seventeenth century and retains carved stalls framed by Corinthian columns. Throughout the church are numerous later altarpieces, sculptures, paintings, wrought-iron screens, and funerary monuments, reflecting the continuous enrichment of the building over the centuries.

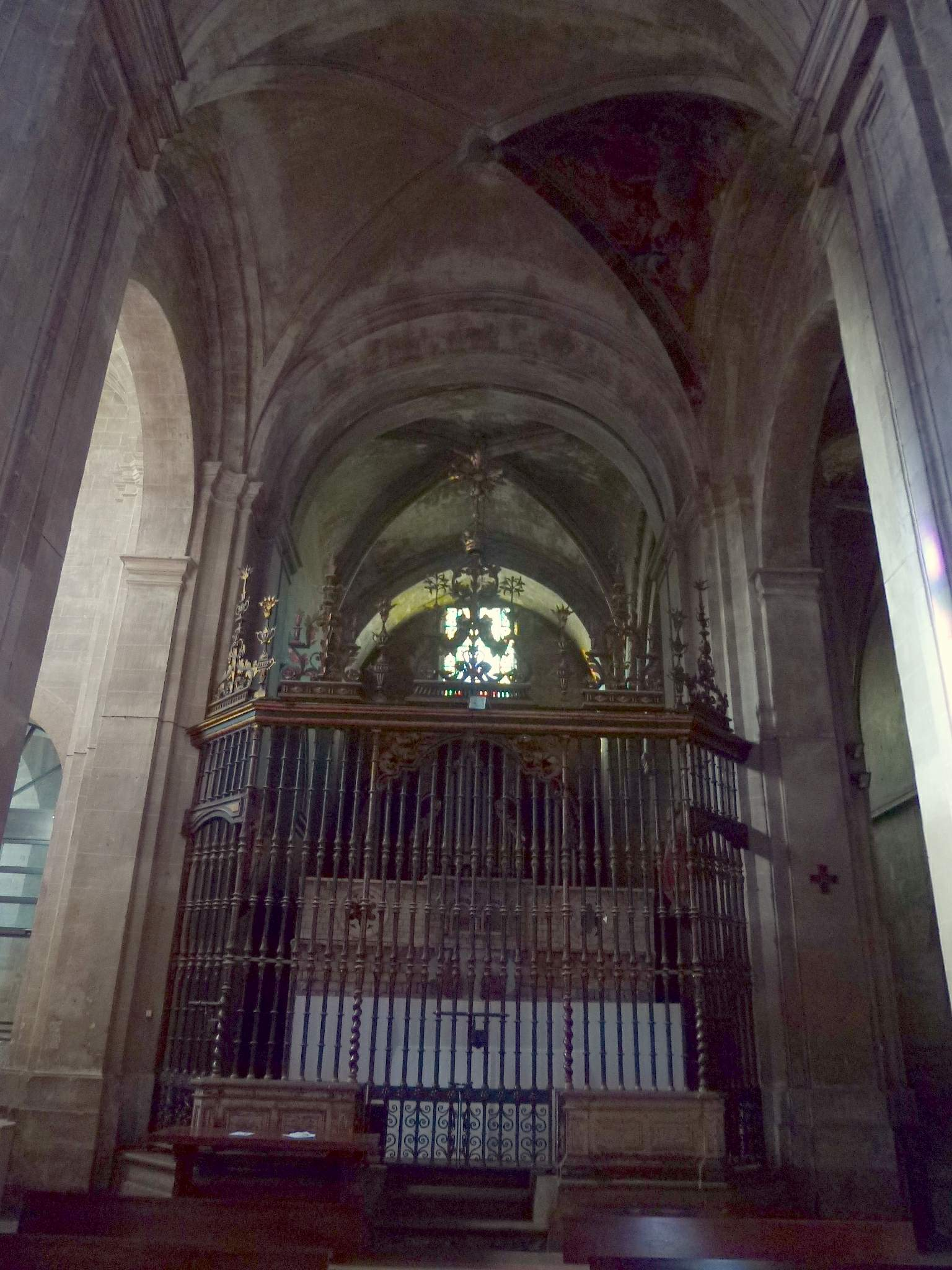
The choir at the west end of the central nave.

=== The lost Chapel of Santa Engracia ===
In the 14th century, Don Rodrigo Alfonso de Medrano, lord of Agoncillo and its castle of Aguas Mansas, chief crossbowman of King Alfonso XI of Castile, was the founder of a chapel dedicated to Saint Engratia in the Imperial Church of Santa María de Palacio. This structure was subsequently demolished during the eastwards extension of the church. Its location was around the site of the present high altar.

== The Reredos ==
The reredos of the high altar, made by Italian artists, was originally constructed for the co-cathedral of Santa María de la Redonda, but the Collegiate Chapter did not accept it because it contained the donor’s coats of arms, those of Arnao de Bruselas, and it was therefore given to the Church of the Palacio.

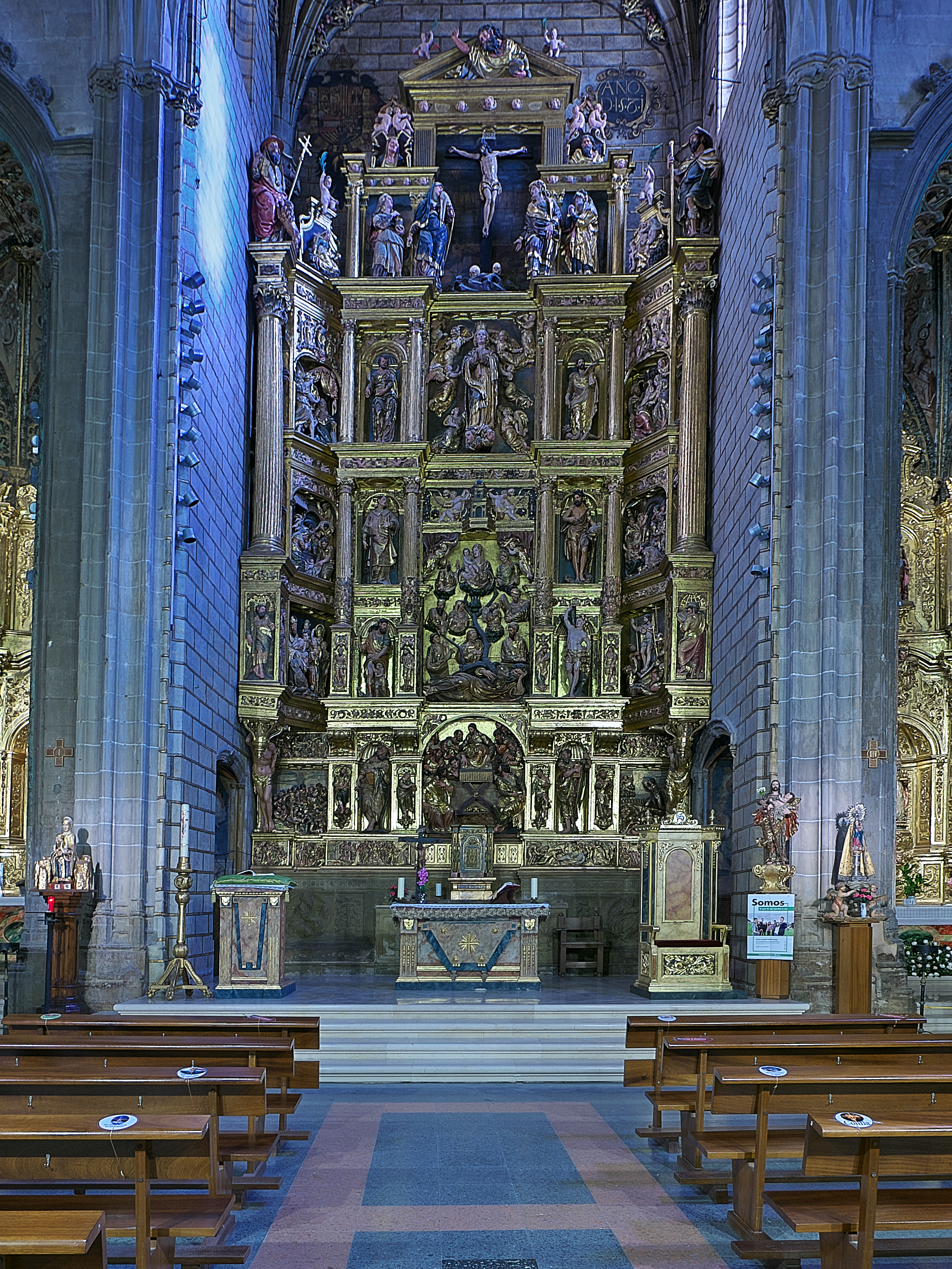
The Bruselas Reredos in Santa Maria de Palacio

It is a Mannerist triptych altarpiece, though restrained in comparison with the style’s usual characteristics. The central sections are separated by superimposed Corinthian columns. The arrangement of the altarpiece is as follows:

Base: The altarpiece rests on a stone base, decorated with two medallions representing prophets: one holding a lyre and the other seated.

Lower predella: From left to right, a narrow plinth depicts scenes from the life of Jesus: the Sanhedrin trial of Jesus, the Scourging at the Pillar, Ecce Homo, the Lamentation of Christ, the Harrowing of Hell, the Emmaus Supper, and female figures.

Predella: From left to right, it represents: Atlas, the Maundy, Saint Mark, Saint Peter, Saint John the Apostle, the Last Supper, Saint Matthew, Saint Paul, Saint Luke, the Agony in the Garden, and a Caryatid.

First level: Saint Andrew, the Presentation of Christ, Saint Roch, the Tree of Jesse, Saint Sebastian, the Resurrection, and a male figure reading.

The most prominent feature is the Tree of Jesse, or the genealogy of Mary: from a reclining Jesse emerge branches that end in Mary and her son after several generations. The male figure on the right-hand side may represent an apostle shown from behind while reading.

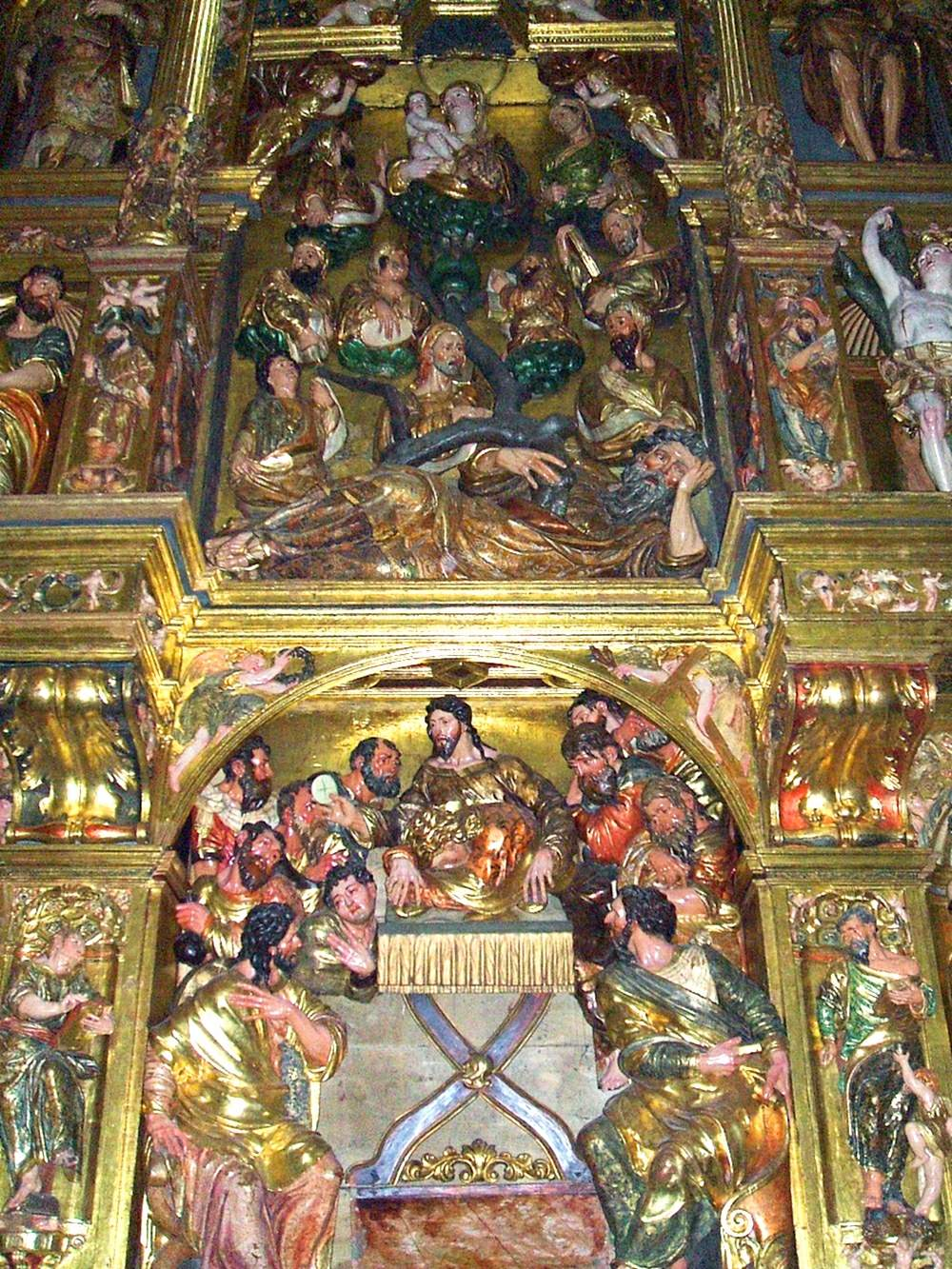
Close up of the Tree of Jessy and the last supper beneath it.

Second level: The Nativity, Saint Lawrence, Saint John the Baptist, and the Epiphany.

Third level: The Annunciation, Saint Bartholomew, the Assumption, an Apostle, and the Visitation.

Attic: Saint Jerome, the Crucifixion (Calvary), and Saint James the Great.

Saint Jerome is depicted wearing cardinal’s robes, with a rampant lion at his feet. Saint James is shown as a pilgrim. The Calvary scene crowns the work and contains the crucifix, the Virgin Mary, Mary Magdalene, and Salome.

== See also ==
- Co-Cathedral of Logroño
- Church of San Bartolomé (Logroño)
