= Jean Francisque Coignet =

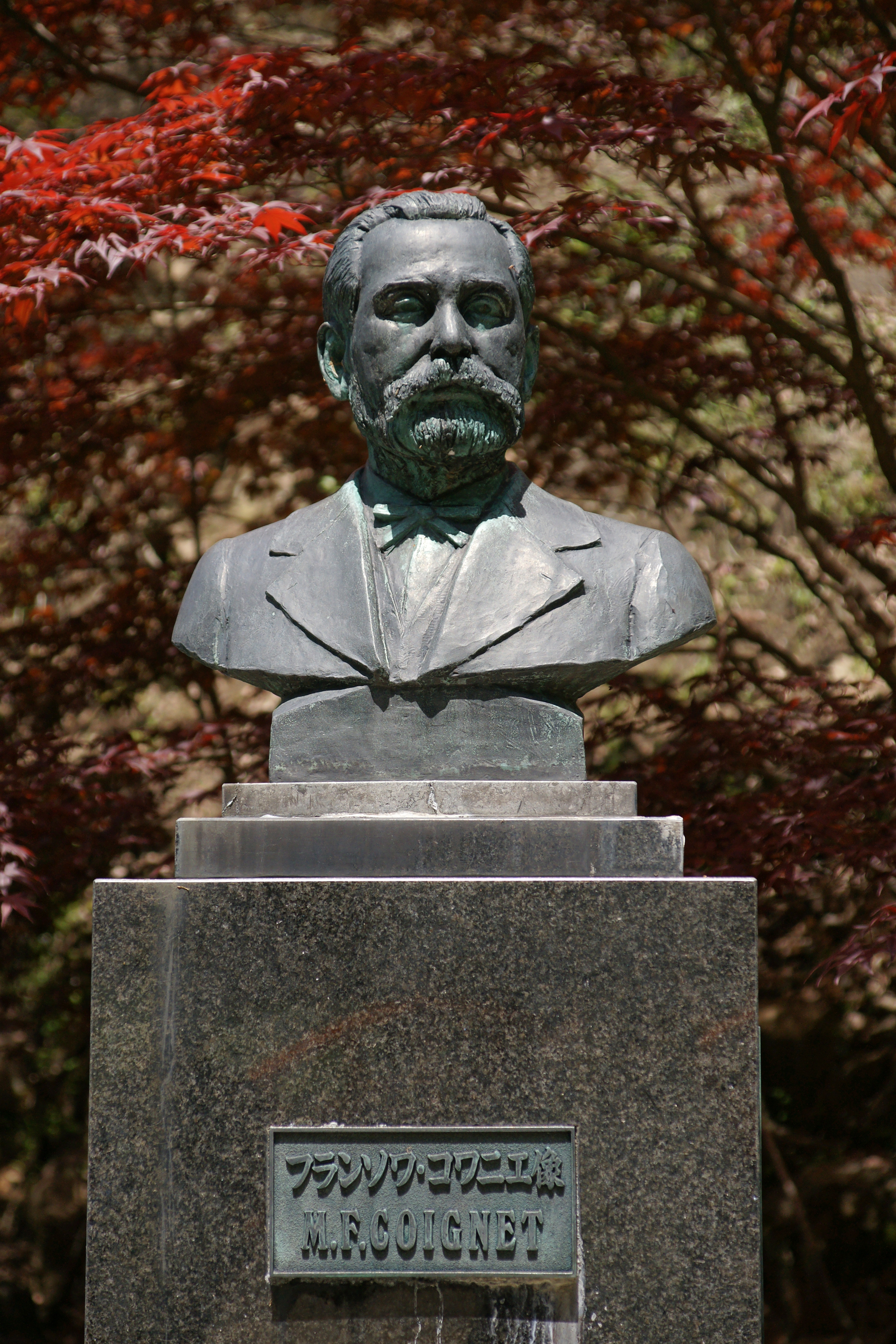
- Jean Francisque Coignet
- Born: 1835; Saint-Étienne, France
- Died: 18 June 1902 (aged 66–67); Saint-Étienne, France
- Occupation: Mining Engineer

Jean Francisque Coignet (1835 – 18 June 1902) was a French mining engineer and government advisor in Bakumatsu and Meiji period Japan noted for his modernization of the Ikuno Silver Mine at Ikuno, Hyōgo Prefecture, near Kobe.

== Biography ==
Coignet was a graduate of the technical school of Saint-Étienne. During the California Gold Rush he travelled to the United States. In 1867, he was hired by the Shimazu clan of Satsuma Domain to develop the mines and mineral resources of that domain. In 1868, his services were transferred to the control of the Tokugawa shogunate, who requested that he re-develop the Ikuno Silver Mine through the introduction of western tunneling techniques and blasting technology. With the Meiji Restoration, his services were transferred to the new Meiji government, which quickly recognized the need to develop new mines and to upgrade existing mines for greater productivity.

In 1874, he published Note sur la richesse minerale du Japon (Memorandum on the mineral resources of Japan). Coignet departed Japan in January 1877. He died at his hometown Saint-Étienne in 1902.
