= Michiel II Coignet =

Belgian painter

Michiel II Coignet (1618 – c.1663) was a Flemish painter specialized in small paintings for cabinets.

Michiel II was born and died in Antwerp. He was the son of Michiel Coignet (1549–1623), the court mathematician of the Archdukes, and his second wife Magdalena Marinus (? - 1663). Michiel II became a successful painter and earned a comfortable living. In 1641 he was admitted, as a master's son, to the Guild of St Luke. He married Maria Salet, with whom he had at least six children: Michiel III, Maria, Cornelis and three children whose names are not known.

A number of signed and ascribed paintings of Michiel Coignet have been sold and a series of four is part of the collection of Lamport Hall. He seems to have had a workshop in which rather small and stereotype paintings could be ordered. He was also very active making paintings for cabinets and received many orders from the cabinet maker Forchondt. Subjects of these plates usually were the lives of saints. He also restored damaged paintings and despite the fact that we know that he had many of these commissions few of these small paintings have been signed and only a few paintings in cabinets are ascribed to him.

== Works by or ascribed to Michiel II Coignet ==
- Cabinet with love scenes, Forchondt workshop and Michiel Coignet, after 1642, J. Zeberg Antiques, Antwerp.
- Cabinet, Forchondt workshop and Michiel Coignet, Rockoxhuis, Antwerp.
- Cabinet, collection Ch. van Zuylen, Aigremont Castle.
- The Prodigal Son, 4 paintings, Lamport Hall, Lamport, Nottinghamshire.
- Venus and Adonis, oil on metal, 17,2 x 22,9 cm, Sotheby's, New York, 1 February 1977.
- The Jewish People in the Desert, oil on canvas, 60 x 80 cm, Kunsthaus am Museum, Cologne, 16 June 1978.
- Still life with bottle, oil on canvas, 50 x 40 cm, Campo & Campo nr.3, Antwerpen, 25–27 May 1993.
- Didon et Enée, 1658, panel, 53 x 75 cm, Etude Daussy de Ricoles, Paris, 5 April 1995.
- A Landscape with Christ on the Way to Emmaus with a Farmer sowing seeds near a Mansion on a river, oil on copper, 50,8 x 66 cm, Christie's, London, 6 July 1995.
- Der Auszug aus der Arche Noah, oil on copper, 27 x 35 cm, also ascribed to Izaak van Oosten, Dorotheum, Wien 17 October 1995.
- Noah's ark, oil on canvas, 108 x 160 cm, also ascribed to the circle of Frederik Bouttats, Bonhams, London, 4 July 1996.
- Orphée charmant les animaux & L'arche de Noé, set of two, oil on copper, 25 x 35 cm, also ascribed to Lambert de Hondt, Tajan, HG V, Paris, 9 December 1996.
- Noah's Ark, paneel, 64 x 90 cm, sign. myfell ***, Sotheby's, London, 11 December 1996.
- Archangel Raphael speaking at the wedding meal of Sarah and Tobias and Tobias' taking leave of his father, oil on panel, 25.5 x 63 cm, Dorotheum, 21 March 2002.
- Le festin de Balthazar, oil on copper, 21,5 x 23,5 cm, Vente Piasa, 22 June 2007.

== Bibliography ==
- Fabri, Ria (1991). De zeventiende eeuwse Antwerpse kunstkast, typologische en historische aspecten. Koninklijke Vlaamse Academie.
- Fabri, Ria (1993). De zeventiende-eeuwse Antwerpse kunstkast, kunsthistorische aspecten. Koninklijke Vlaamse Academie.
- Meskens, Ad (1998). Familia Universalis: Coignet. Royal Museum of Fine Arts, Antwerp.
- Rombouts, Philip Felix; van Lerius, Theodoor (1874). De liggeren en andere historische archieven der Antwerpsche Sint Lucasgilde. Baggerman.
- van der Stock, Jan (1993). Antwerpen: verhaal van een metropool. Snoeck-Ducaju & zoon.
