= Cognetti =

Cognetti is an Italian surname. Notable people with the surname include:

- Goffredo Cognetti (1855–1943), Italian writer
- Paige Cognetti (born 1980), American politician from Pennsylvania
- Paolo Cognetti (born 1978), Italian writer and filmmaker
- Stephen Cognetti, American film director and writer
