= Cognetics =

Cognetics may refer to:

- Cognetics, the concept introduced by Jef Raskin
- Cognetics Corporation
