= Gillis Coignet =

Renaissance painter

Saint George Slaying the Dragon, 1581

Gillis Coignet or Gillis Coignet (I), known in Italy as Giulio Cognietta (many variant spellings of the family name, including Quinet, Quinget, Cognget, Cognet, Coignet, Congnet and Quiniet) (c. 1542 – 1599) was a Flemish Renaissance painter. He painted mainly mythological, biblical and allegorical subjects, and was particularly known for his nocturnal scenes lit by candlelight or moonlight. During a decade long sojourn in Italy, he absorbed the influence of contemporary Italian artists, in particular, Titian and Tintoretto. As a Lutheran, he was forced to leave Antwerp after the Fall of Antwerp in 1585 and spent the final part of his career first in Amsterdam and then Hamburg.

== Biography ==
=== Antwerp ===
Gillis was born in Antwerp, as the son of Gillis the Elder, a goldsmith and a manufacturer of astronomical and mathematical instruments, and Brigitta Anthonis Hendricksdr. His precise birth date is not known. In the certification book of the city of Antwerp of 1579 he stated to be 37 years old, in that of 1586 he stated to be 43. Therefore, he must have been born between April and September of 1542. He was born with a large hairy mole in his face, hence his nickname Gillis met de Vlek (Gillis with the Spot). In 1543, father Gillis the Elder became a master in the Guild of Saint Luke of Antwerp. When he died in 1562/63 he left behind at least three sons, Jacob, Gillis (I) and Michiel, and a daughter, Brigitta.

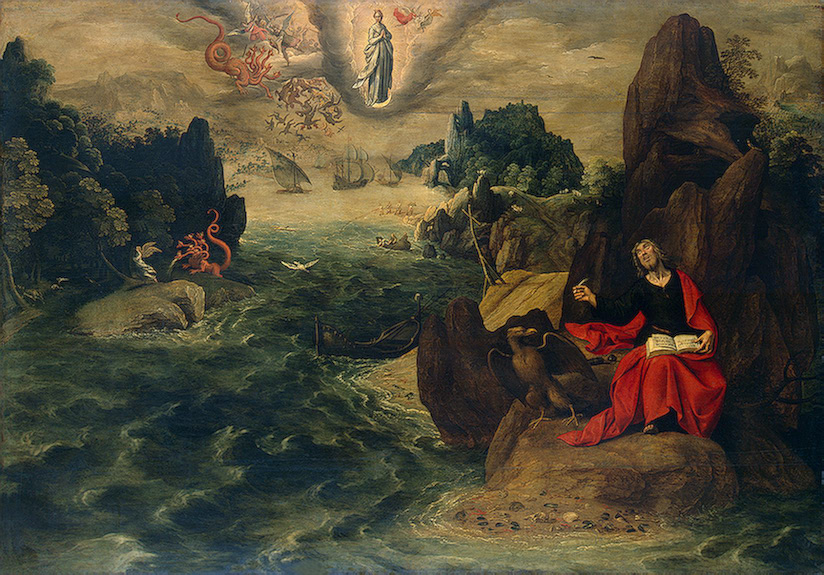
Saint John the Evangelist on Patmos, with Tobias Verhaecht

According to the Liggeren (Guild books) of the Guild of Saint Luke, Gillis was apprenticed to the obscure painter Lambrecht Wenslyns. Van Mander's claim that during his apprenticeship he stayed with the art dealer Anthony Palerme is corroborated by Palermo's 1586 testimony that Gillis was boarding with him when his parents were still alive (i.e. before 1562). In 1561 Gillis was admitted to the Guild of St. Luke as a Master.

=== Italy ===
In the second half of the 1560s he journeyed through Italy, where he visited inter al. Florence, Rome, Naples and Sicily. According to the Florentine Accademio del Disegno, Giulio Cognietta fiamingo P[ictor] was present at their meeting of 16 January 1568. In Terni (Umbria) he worked with a painter called Stello on frescoes and an altar in fresco style. According to Van Mander, Stello was Flemish, Nicole Dacos identifies this Stello as a member of the family of painters Stellaert from Mechelen. Both painters are mentioned in a document as members of a group of decorators who embellished the salon of the Villa d'Este under the supervision of Federico Zuccaro. They also worked on an embossed grotesque in the Palazzo Giocosi. Apparently Gillis also worked for Francesco de' Medici.

=== Return to Antwerp ===
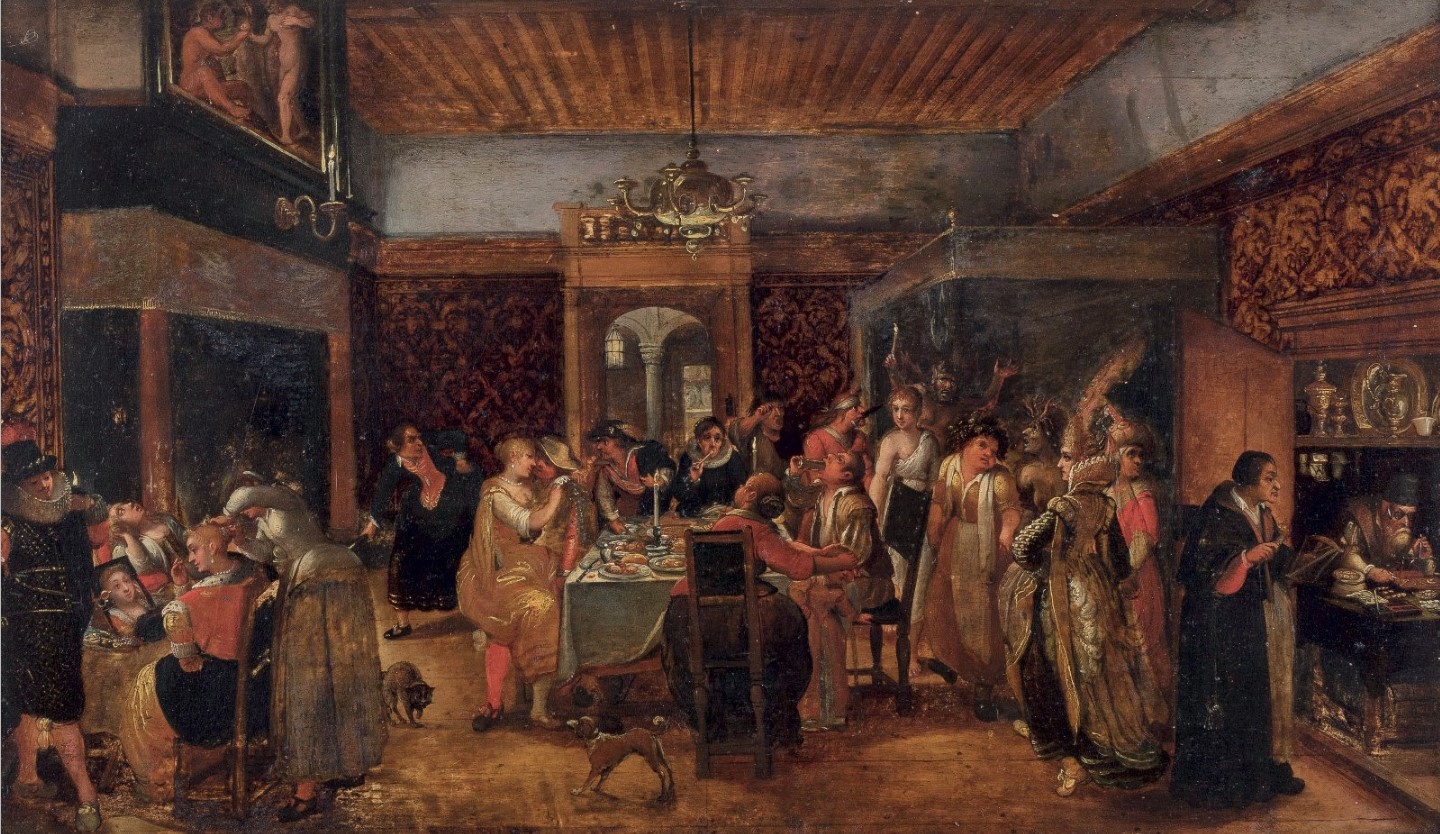
The seven deadly sins

After 1570 he returned to Antwerp where he employed a number of apprentices. In July 1571 the painter Willem vanden Bosch wrote to the Duke of Alba that Gillis would like to enter the service of the Duke. Gillis was married to Magdalena de Kempeneer, but it is uncertain whether he married her before or after his Italian journey. They had only one child Juliana (?- about 1616).

At the end of the 1570s they lived in the house De hove van de Jonge Voetboog, which belonged to the Guild of St-Joris (St. George). In March 1580 he and his wife bought the lifelong usufruct of the house for 750 guilders on the condition that the Guild members could use the bowling green at any time. The house stood in the Schuttershofstraat and had a rent value of 40 guilders.

For the monthly quotisation, a special tax levied to pay for defence against the Spaniards, Gillis Coignet's family was taxed at 2 guilders 10 stivers indicating that Gillis enjoyed affluent circumstances. At that time Gillis was considered to be a Lutheran.

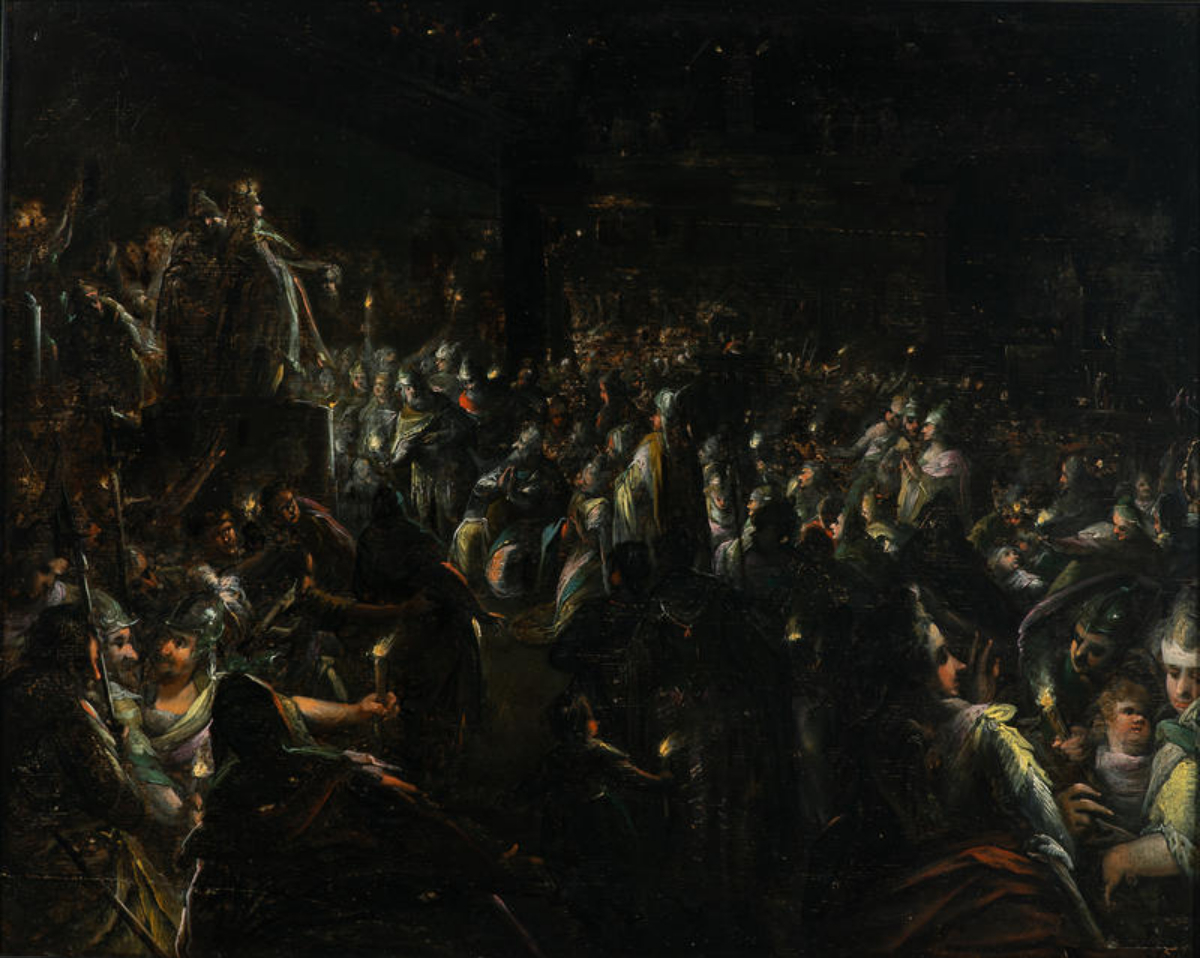
Night Scene with Judith showing Holofernes's head to the people of Bethulia, 1590s

In 1581 Gillis became a member of the Armenbus of the Guild of St. Luke. The Armenbus was founded in 1538, following the example of other trades, and was formed to support the members who by sickness or accident were unable to support their families or whose relatives were too poor to pay for the burial service. After joining the Armenbus there was a waiting period before the benefits could be enjoyed. The Armenbus was chaired by two 'busmeesters', in the first year one was 'medebusmeester' (deputy chairman) and in the succeeding year became 'hoofdbusmeester' (chairman). In 1582, one year after joining the Armenbus Gillis became mede-busmeester, in the following year he became hoofdbusmeester with Philip Galle, the engraver, as medebusmeester. This same year Gillis seems to have persuaded a number of his relatives to become members of the Armenbus, including his brothers the physician Jacob and the court mathematician Michiel together with their wives.

In 1584 Gillis became Dean of the Guild of St. Luke, a post he would continue to perform during and shortly after the siege by the Spaniards. It therefore can be no surprise that doubts about his religion and his behaviour were raised after the Reconciliation. In 1586, however, Anthony Palerme and Jan van de Kerckhove testified that Gillis had behaved himself "with all modesty and peacefulness". Gillis also testified on behalf of other Guild members, e.g. he testified together with Philip Galle and Gerard de Jode that Marten van Valckenborch and his son-in-law Henrick van Steenwijck were citizens of the town.

It appears that Gillis had no intention to leave the city at that time. He paid his dues to the Guild for 1585–86, and on 3 October 1585 he and Philips Galle, the new Dean, examined the accounts of the Guild. Apparently some difficulties arose, a dispute occurred and a conciliatory meeting with the elders (= previous deans) was held on 26 October 1585. His last appearance in the Guild books dates back to Ascension Day 1586, when it became apparent that the accounts he and Ambrosius Vrancken had drawn up did not balance.

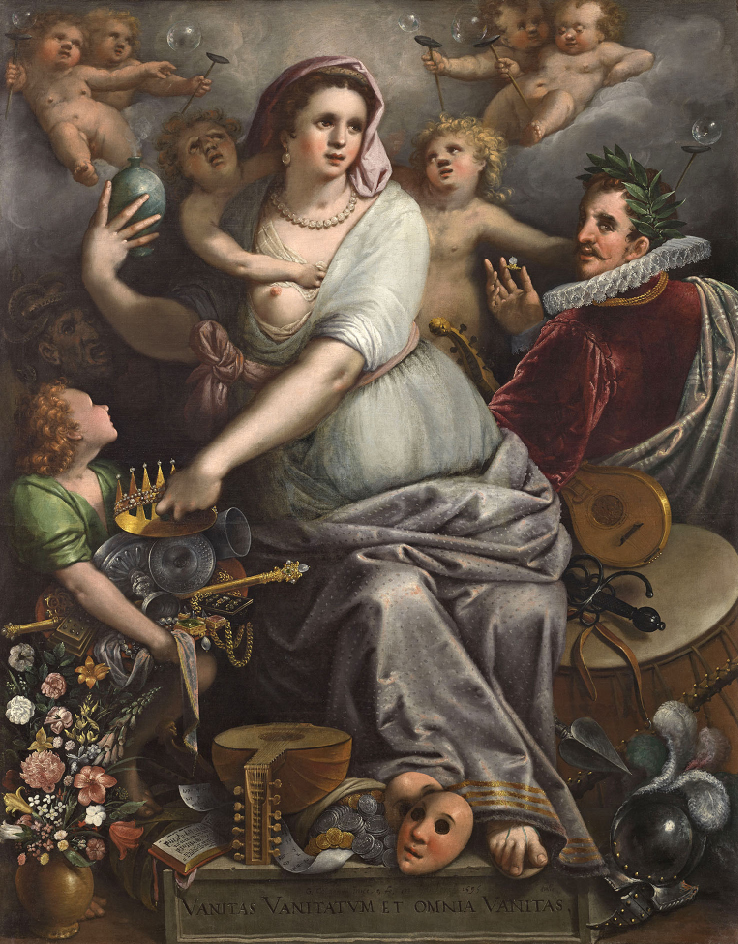
Allegory of Vanity with Georg Flegel

In the Spring of 1586 Gillis sold the usufruct of the house to Hendrik Jennen. A note from Philip Galle, written after 4 September 1586, makes clear that Gillis had left town.

=== Amsterdam ===
Gillis went to Amsterdam, where he became a citizen in 1589. According to van Mander he was a successful painter in Amsterdam, and influenced the art scene in that city considerably. Van Mander also asserts that it was Gillis Coignet who persuaded Hans Vredeman de Vries to come to Amsterdam.

On 6 April 1588 he was a representative for the Lutheran community of Amsterdam. On 15 March 1590 he had a dispute with the Calvinist painter Adriaan Conflans. It is not clear whether their religious beliefs had anything to do with this dispute, but it is not impossible as the relations between Lutherans and Calvinists in the Amsterdam at that time were very bad indeed.

=== Hamburg ===
About 1593-94 Gillis went to Hamburg, "because of his religion or something else" according to van Mander, and he is last mentioned in Amsterdam on 21 January 1593, when he was a witness at a baptism. His painting The 1592 Lottery in Aid of the Lunatic Asylum , painted in Amsterdam, is dated May 1593, while The Last Supper was painted in Hamburg in 1595. The account books of Johann Adolf, Duke of Gottorf record that in 1597 he was paid for various portraits he made for the Duke. In the next year he received again payments from the Duke for two paintings, likely of figures. It is possible that to complete some of these commissions he travelled to the Duke's Gottorf Castle in the Duchy of Holstein-Gottorp, which was just a short drive from Hamburg.

Gillis died in Hamburg on 27 October 1599 and was buried in the St. James' Church. His daughter Juliana married Philips van der Veken. She died before or during 1616. Her husband tried, as the executor of her will, to recover the money which her father had lent to the city of Antwerp.

== Work ==
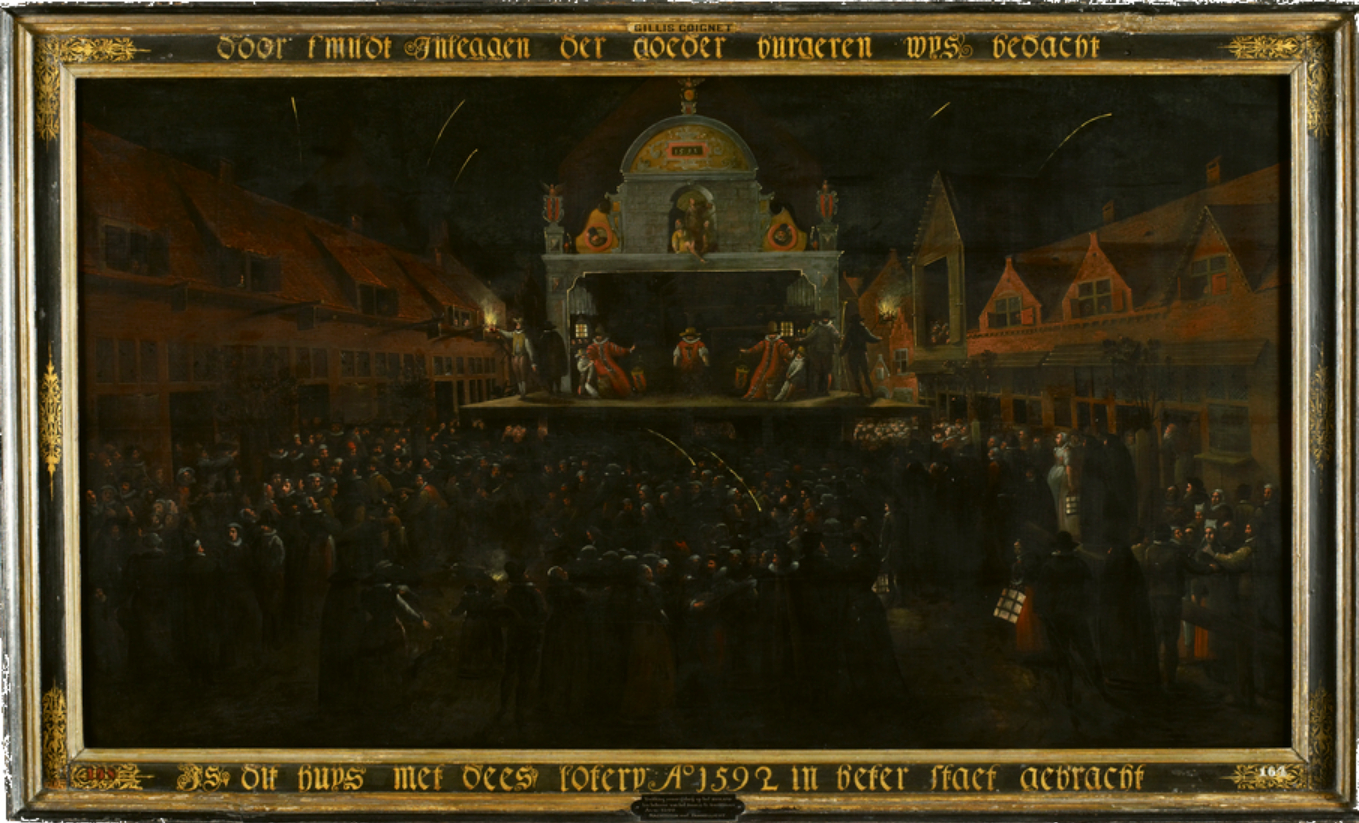
The 1592 Lottery in Aid of the Lunatic Asylum

He painted mainly mythological, biblical and allegorical subjects, and was particularly known for his nocturnal scenes lit by candlelight or moonlight. His paintings betray the influence of the Venetian school and more in particular that of Titian and Tintoretto. The quick dashes and the diversity of the tonality evokes the later work of Titian. This is very clear in the painting The rape of Europe (1590s). His Portrait of Pierson la Hues demonstrates very good observational skills. According to Van Mander Gillis Coignet painted many night scenes, in which he employed gold leaf to highlight torches and candles. This is illustrated by his painting of The 1592 Lottery in Aid of the Lunatic Asylum (1593).

His Lutheran conviction shows in his paintings, for instance in his Last Judgment (Church of Saint Peter, Hamburg, 1595). Figures which are usual in such paintings, such as Maria and St. John are omitted and replaced by allegorical figures such as Pax with the Lamb and Justice.

Many of his paintings are only known to us through engravings made by his contemporaries like Raphael Sadeler, Jan Sadeler (I), Pieter de Jode I and Philip Galle. It is also necessary to mention that, according to Van Mander, that "people complained of him that he sold his apprentices' copies as his own work after he had retouched them a little."

== Gallery ==
Selected works

Pierson la Hues, 1581

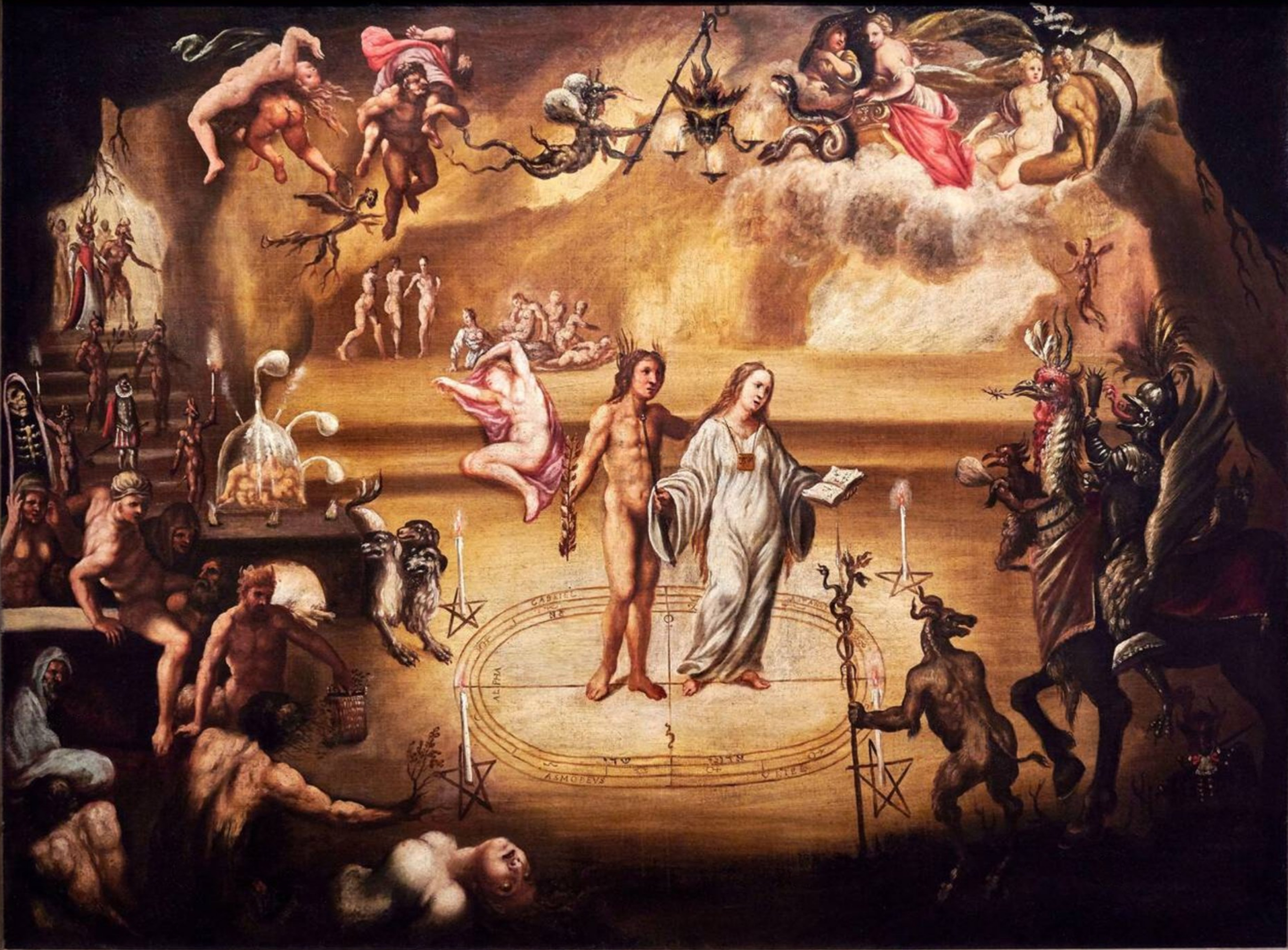
Scene of black magic, 1590s

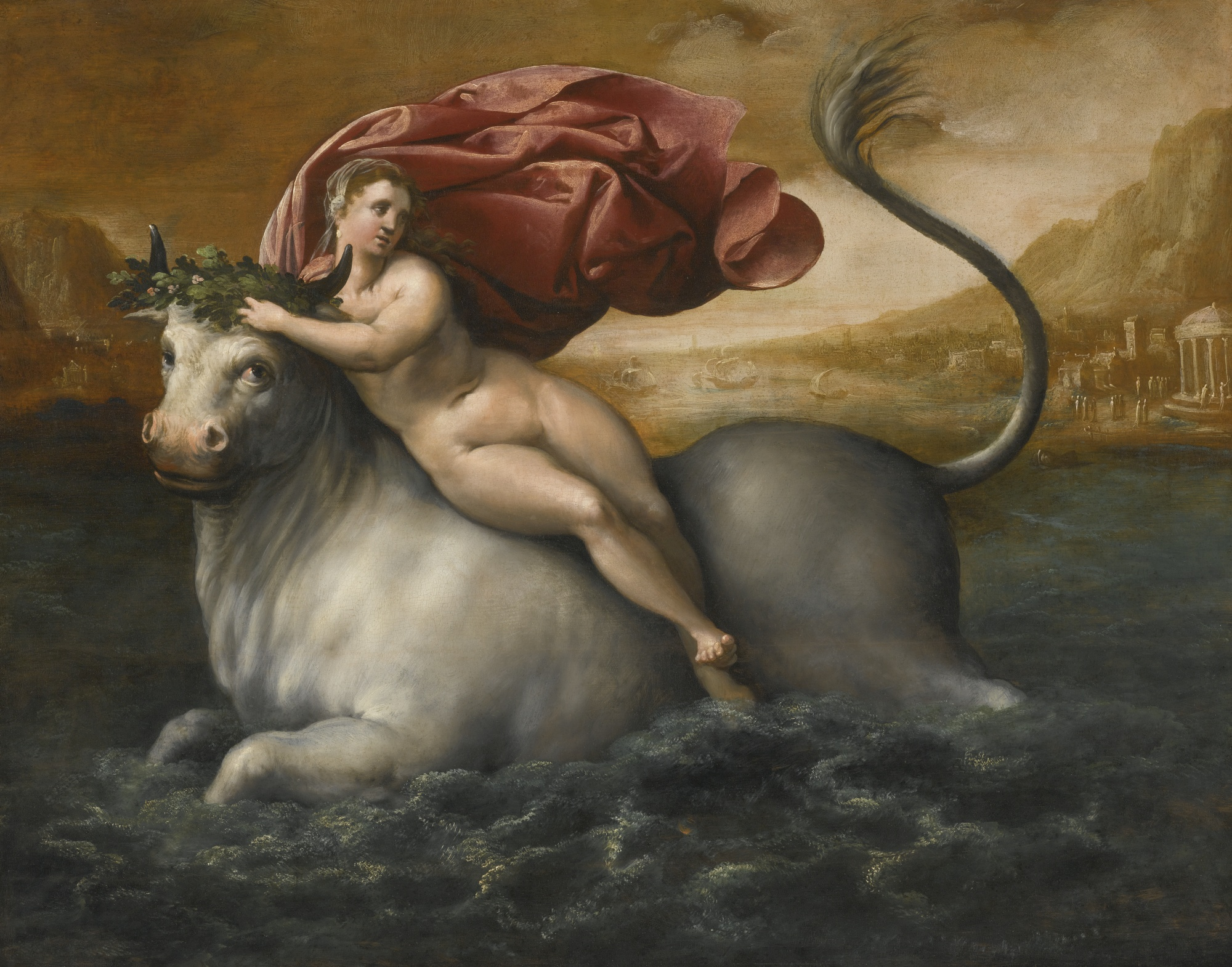
The rape of Europe, 1590s

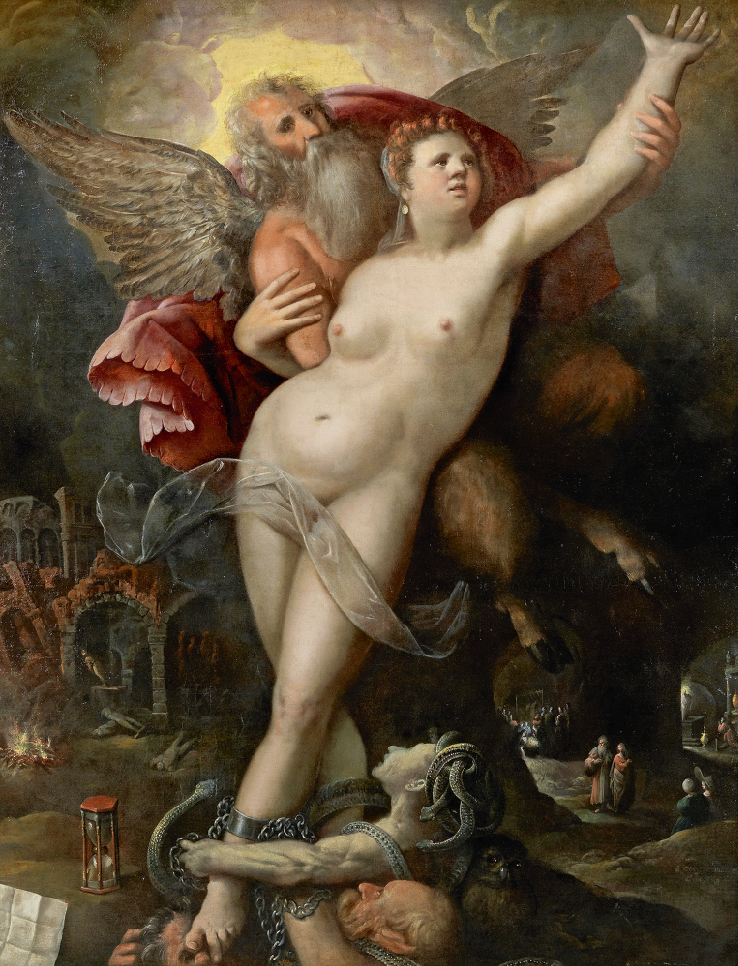
Allegory of Time revealing Truth, 1596

=== Autographed ===
- Last Judgment (also: Allegory of the charitas christiana), 1572, oil on canvas, 570 x 200 cm, private collection.
- Fire at the Antwerp Citadel, 1577, oil on canvas, 80 x 120 cm, private collection.
- Amor and Venus, 1579, copy after Titian, oak panel, 139 x 96 cm, Hessisches Landesmuseum, Kassel, lost during the Second World War.
- Saint George, 1581, panel, 193 x 225 cm, Royal Museum of Fine Arts, Antwerp.
- Pierson la Hues, drummer boy of the Old Handbow Guild (Oude Handbooggilde), 1581, panel, 170 x 133 cm, Royal Museum of Fine Arts, Antwerp
- Queen Dido is presented with a town plan, 1583, panel, 175 x 253 cm, Museum Vleeshuis, Antwerpen.
- Annunciation, 1584, Co-cathedral of Santa María de la Redonda, Logroño, Spain
- Epiphany, 1584, Logroño, as previous
- St Peter, 1584, Logroño, as previous
- Reclining lady with Cupid and gentleman, sitting on a drum, playing the harpsichord (also: Mars and Venus or Venus and Music), 1590, oil on canvas, 145 x 220 cm, Franke, Leipzig, 1933.
- The 1592 Lottery in Aid of the Lunatic Asylum, 1593, panel, 113 x 203,5 cm, Amsterdams Historisch Museum, Amsterdam.
- Last Supper, (sketch), 1594, panel, Ducal Museum, Gotha
- Last Supper, 1595, oil on canvas, 163 x 333 cm, St-Petrikirche, Hamburg.
- Vanitas, 1595, oil on canvas, 200 x 159 cm, Musée Baron Gérard, Bayeux.
- Mars and Venus, 1598, oil on canvas, 113 x 182 cm, Musée du Présidial, Saintes, Charente-Maritime
- Danae, undated, panel, 116,5 x 168,5, Christie's, New York.
- Petri-Altar (also Grabower-Altar), by Bertram van Minden, of which Gillis overpainted the wings. During the nineteenth century restoration the painting by Gillis Coignet was removed. They depicted Resurrection and Pentecost. Hamburger Kunsthalle, Hamburg.
- Saters during Dionysius' feast, undated, Mak van der Waay, Amsterdam 1972.
- Time reveals Truth, undated, oil on canvas, 170 x 190 cm, Fernand Niedecker, 1939.

=== Undated and ascribed to Gillis Coignet ===
- Scene of black magic, oil on canvas, 140 x 105 cm, Pinacoteca Vaticana, Vatican.
- Plato's cave, 174 x 131 cm, panel, Musée de la Chartreuse, Douai.
- Diana discovers Callisto's betrayal, oil on canvas, 175 x 103 cm, Szépmüvéstzeti Múzeum, Budapest.
- Sine Cerere et Baccho friget Venus, oil on canvas, 242 x 166 cm, Statens Konstmuseer, Stockholm.
- Balthazars Feast, panel, 97 x 72,5 cm, Musée d'Arras, Ancienne Abbaye de Saint Vaast, Arras.
- Judith shows Holofernes's head to the inhabitants of Bethulia, panel, 62,5 x 149 cm, Musée des Beaux-Arts, Caen.
- The Gods on the Olympos, 93 x 130,5 cm, London, Trafalgar Galleries.
- The liberation of Andromeda, oil on canvas, 214 x 124 cm, also ascribed to Mathias Gundelach, Lempertz, Keulen, 3 October 1928.
- The port of Venice, Lempertz, Cologne, 21–24 April 1937.
- Landscape with Paris' Judgment, private collection, Taiwan.
- Diana and her nimphs surprised by Actaeon, 75 x 96,5 cm, also ascribed to A. Van Blocklandt, Christie's, London, 22 July 1983.
- An allegory; Spain as protector of religion, the liberal arts, science and agriculture in the Netherlands, oil on canvas, 31 x 45,5 cm; also ascribed to Hendrick de Clerck, Sotheby's, 12 December 1984.
- Cleopatra, oil on canvas, 116 x 102 cm, Lenormand, Paris, 11 December 1991 (24).
- Venus and Cupid, 82 x 66,5 cm, also ascribed to Hendrik Goltzius, Christie's, London, 29 October 1993.
- Psyche and Cupid, 127,7 x 174,7 cm, oil on canvas, also ascribed to Bartholomeus Spranger's circle, Christie's, New York, 12 January 1996.
- Diana and Actaeon, 146 x 186,5 cm, oil on canvas, also ascribed to Jacob de Backer, Sotheby's, London, 11 December 1996.
- Ceiling paintings in the Palazzo Giocosi, Terni: Giunone e le nimfe and Perseo e Andromeda.
- Grotesques in the Villa d'Este .
- Orpheus charming the animals, 50.8 x 94 cm, oil on panel (cradled panel), Chiswick Auctions, London, 12th of April 2023.

=== Etchings after paintings by Gillis Coignet ===
- P. de Jode, Aristotle and Phyllis.
- P. Galle, The four Eras of Mankind, 1573, four copper etchings, 31,5 x 24,7 cm, diameter 24,5 cm.
- J. Matham, Moses lets the rock spill water.
- J. Muller, Last Supper, 3 plates, 44,5 x 93,3 cm.
- J. Sadeler I, John the Baptist, kneeling, 24,5 x 20,1 cm.
- J. Sadeler I, Kneeling St Peter, 20,2 x 15 cm.
- R. Sadeler I, Cleopatra's Death, 19,8 x 25,7 cm (25).
- R. Sadeler I, Venus, Bacchus and Ceres, 19,9 x 24,6 cm (20).
- J. Wiercx, The Three christian Charities.
- s.n., Orisgonta Tebessa, Gideon.
- s.n., Susanna in bath.
