= Michiel Coignet =

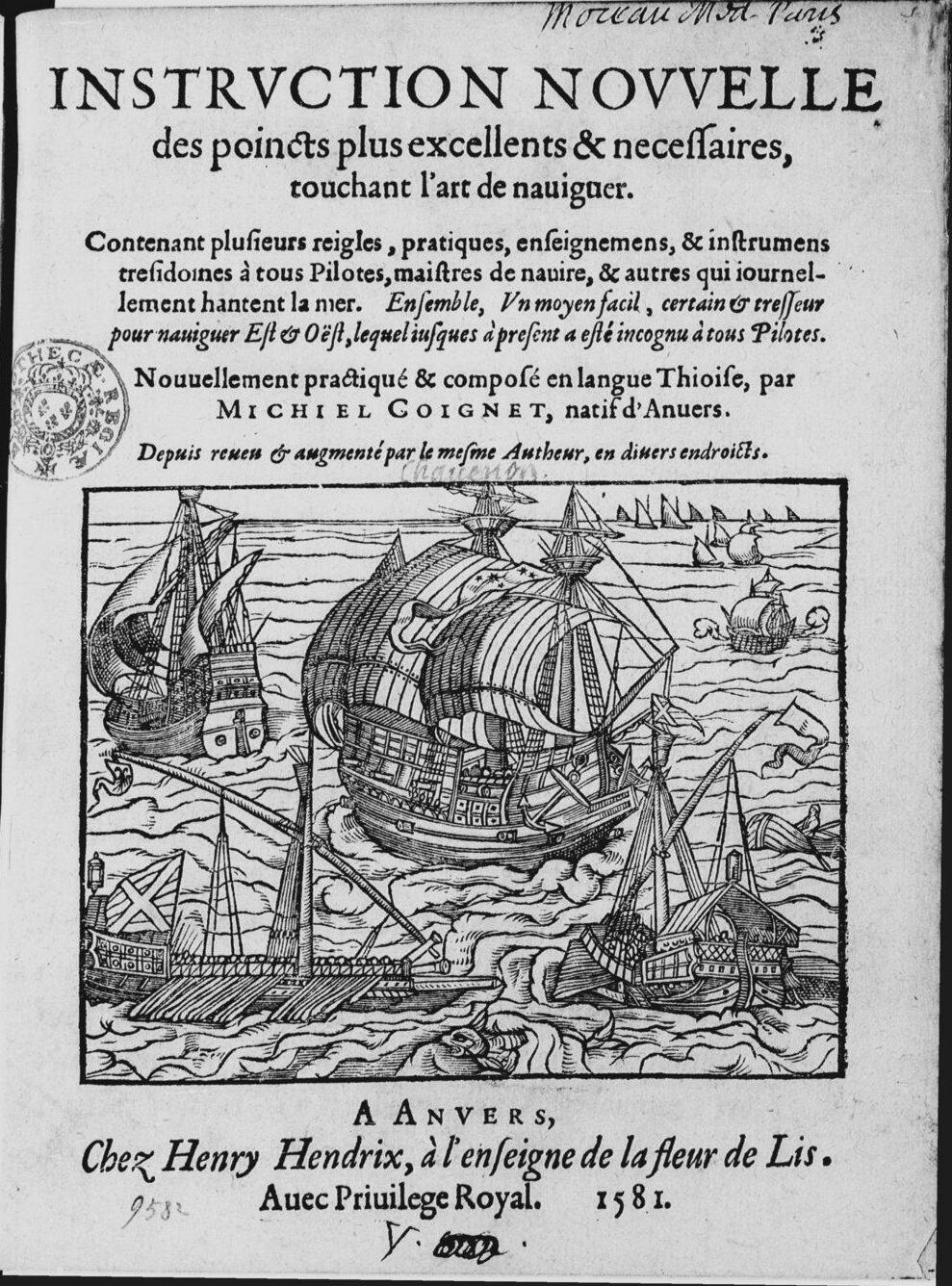
Frontispiece of the Instruction nouvelle, 1581, Antwerp

Michiel Coignet (also Quignet, Cognet or Connette in Italian) (1549 in Antwerp – 24 December 1623 in Antwerp) was a Flemish polymath who made significant contributions to various disciplines including cosmography, mathematics, navigation and cartography. He also built new and improved scientific instruments and made military engineering designs.

Coignet was a scientist at the court of the governors of the Spanish Netherlands Albert VII, Archduke of Austria and Isabella Clara Eugenia where he held a position similar to that of his compatriot Simon Stevin at the rival court of Maurice, Prince of Orange.

== Life ==
Michiel Coignet's father Gillis (also known as Egidius) was a goldsmith and maker of astronomical and mathematical instruments in Antwerp and was married to Brigitte Anthonis Hendriks. Michiel's brother Jacob III became a physician while his brother Gillis I became a painter. Michiel's father died in 1562–1563. The details on Michiel's education are scarce. He was admitted to the St Ambrose Guild of School Teachers in 1568. He taught French and mathematics. It is likely that at the time he started working as a teacher he had already studied higher mathematics since the mathematics class he taught was referred to as 'mathematicam' whereas lower mathematics was referred to as 'cijfferen' (calculation).

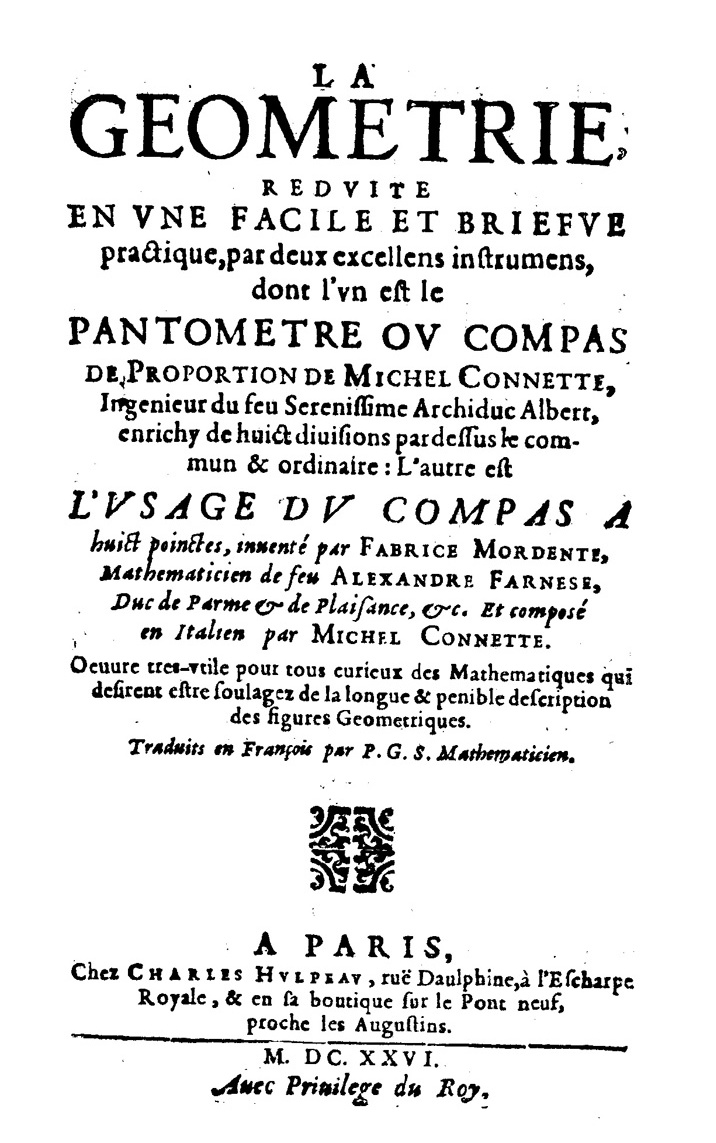
Géometrie reduite en une facile et briefve practique par deux excellens instrumens, 1626

He married Maria vanden Eynde c. 1570 and the couple would have 10 children. Only their son Antonius was still alive at the time of his death. In 1572-73 Michiel Coignet was appointed by the city as 'wijnroeier' ('wine gauger'). The wijnroeier was a municipal employee tasked with measuring the wine barrels that arrived in the city in order to calculate the taxes due. From the year 1572 also dates Michiel's first signed instrument, an astrolabium. This is an indication that his mother likely kept her deceased husband's workshop in operation until her son could become a master of the Guild of Saint Luke. Michiel became a member of the Guild as the son of a member in 1581 and became a full master in 1589 after a period of apprenticeship. He also became a member of the Guild of Meerse, which was the guild of the shopkeepers and wine gaugers.

Michiel Coignet converted to the Protestant faith. After the Fall of Antwerp in 1585, he joined a local schutterij called the 'kolveniersgilde'. Since only Catholics were typically allowed to join the schutterij it is assumed that he had reconverted to Catholicism. His brother Gillis, however, did not and emigrated to Amsterdam where he had a successful career as an artist. In 1585 Coignet stopped teaching except for classes for military officers and sons of prosperous merchants.

Michiel Coignet remained in this position of 'wijnroeier' until he started his service as a mathematician and engineer for the Archdukes in 1596. He would remain in court service until his death in 1623. In 1604 Coignet received a further stipend from the court for his role as of cosmographer. In 1606, he remarried after the death of his first wife in November 1605 and had four children from this second marriage. One of them was the painter Michiel II Coignet (1618–1663).

In the summer of 1623 Coignet made a request to the Archduchess Isabella to get a pension. She yielded his request and decided to grant him a single lump sum for his services. However, Coignet died before the sum was paid. The Archduchess Isabella wanted to have his works published, but this plan was not realized.

== Instrument making ==
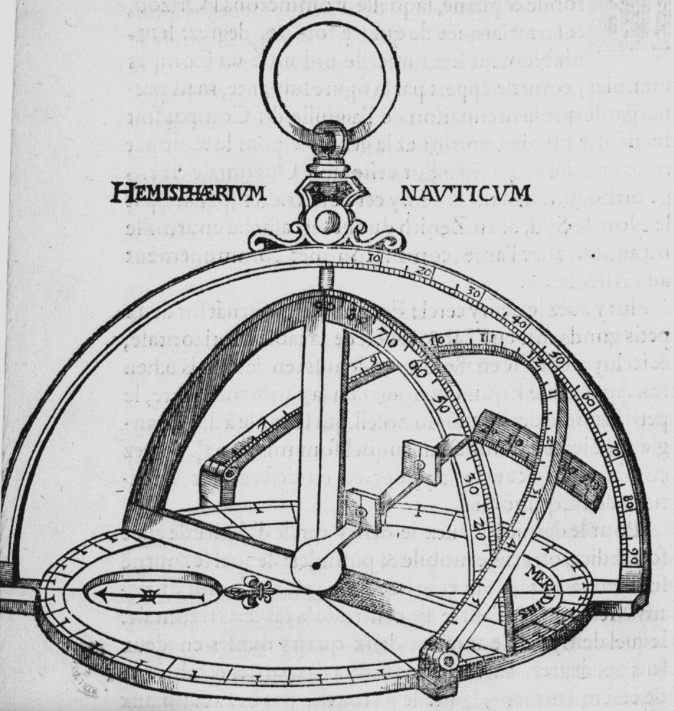
Nautical hemisphere, illustration from the Instruction nouvelle

Coignet invented several instruments and corresponded with Galileo Galilei (from 1588), Gerhard Mercator, Godefroy Wendelin, Ludolph van Ceulen and Fabrizio Mordente, whom he met during the latter's 1584 sojourn in Antwerp. Among other things, Coignet invented and described instruments that had a function similar to that of the proportional compass. During the dispute over the invention of the proportional compass in 1610, Giovanni Camillo Glorioso attributed the invention to Coignet and not to Galileo, although the instrument is now mainly attributed to Coignet's friend Mordente. Coignet distributed the computational functions over several bars and described the instrument in several treatises: on the flat ruler (Traité des Sinus, 1610); flat-legged proportional compasses (De regulae pantometae, 1612); and four-point proportional compasses (El uso del compas proportional, 1618).

== Navigation ==
Strongly encouraged by Gillis Hooftman in 1580 Coignet published a treatise on navigation entitled Nieuwe Onderwijsinghe op de principaelste Puncten der Zeevaert ('New Instructions on the Principal Points of Navigation'). It was published by the Antwerp publisher Hendrik Hendriksen as an appendix to the Dutch-language translation of Pedro de Medina's Arte de Navegar. In the appendix he pointed to the possibility of determining longitude at sea with watches on the ships. He also described some of his newly invented instruments such as the nautical hemisphere. The nautical hemisphere is an instrument with which the longitude problem could, in theory, be solved. In 2008 an example of this instrument, likely made in Coignet's workshop, surfaced during an exhibition on the history of the Jesuit Seminary of Tournai.

An expanded, French-language version of the 'Nieuwe Onderwijsinghe prepared by Coignet was published in 1581 by Hendrik Hendriksen under the title Instruction nouvelle des poincts plus excellents et nécessaires, touchant l'art de naviguer... nouvellement practiqué et composé en langue thioise, par Michiel Coignet,... Depuis reveu et augmenté par le mesme autheur...

== Cartography ==
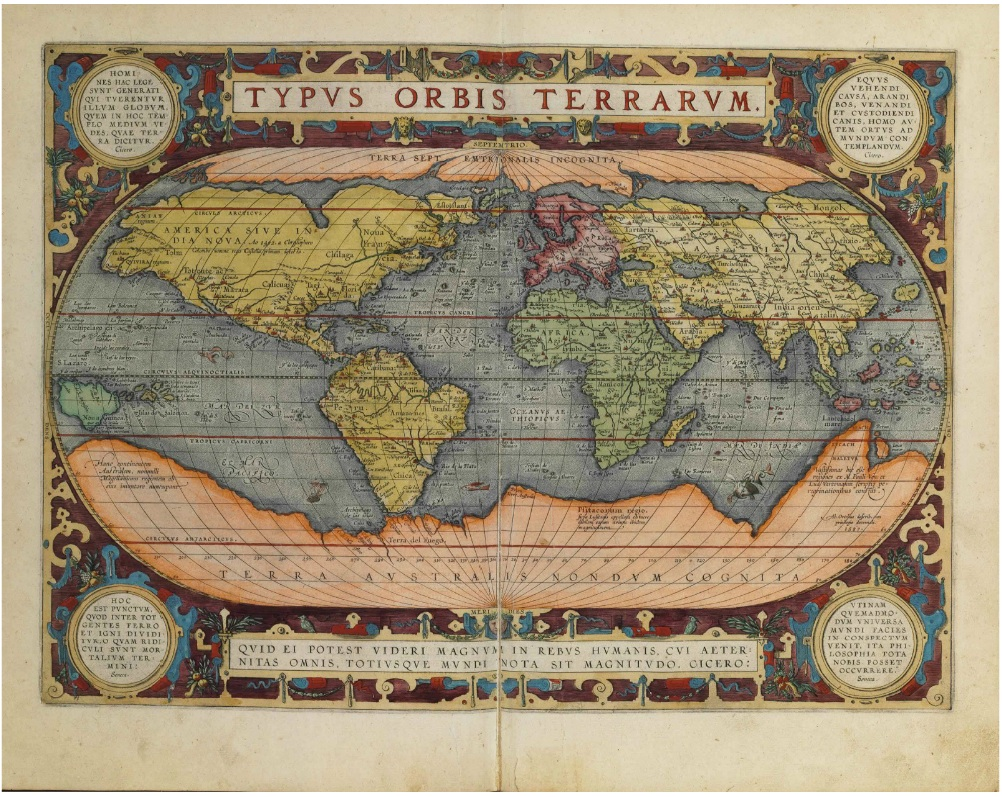
Theatrum orbis terrarum, edited by Michiel Coignet, Antwerp, 1612

Around 1600 Coignet became involved in the publication of atlases. He edited various editions of the world maps of Abraham Ortelius. He added an introduction on projections and 13 maps to some editions of Ortelius' atlas published as Epitome theatri orbis terrarum d'Ortelius (1601). The Latin-language 'Epitome' was quickly translated into English and French. Coignet edited the French version published in Antwerp. One of the new maps was a map with a description of Japan, for which he had obtained the information from Jesuit sources. Coignet also added an introduction to the atlas Speculum Orbis terrarum of Gerard de Jode.

In 1621 Coignet drew a map that showed the preferred itinerary for merchants and merchandise traveling from Flanders to Milan (two copies are preserved one of which is kept in the library of the Katholieke Universiteit Leuven). The map was promoted in May 1621 by the Antwerp newspaper Nieuwe Tijdinghe in an advertisement that referred to the route as the Prince conduitte since the route fell supposedly under the protection of the Archdukes. The advertisement claimed that the proposed itinerary would reduce travel time by 10 to 12 days and was 'without danger'.

== Mathematics ==
Coignet may have been a pupil of the German mathematician Valentin Mennher, whose books he published in new editions after Mennher's death in 1570. He also edited Willem Raets' Arithmetica in 1580 and included an appendix on wine gauging. As a mathematician Coignet was highly regarded by his contemporaries and was praised by the Flemish mathematician Adriaan van Roomen. He taught the subject including during his European tour when he instructed Marin Getaldić and the officers of Archduke Albert. Getaldić was later in Paris from where he informed Coignet in a letter dated 15 February 1600 about the mathematician François Viète.

== Military engineering design ==
Coignet was involved in various military engineering projects mainly related to fortification and wrote about ballistics in one of his treatises (El uso de las doze diuisiones geometricas, 1618). From 1596 he worked for the Archdukes on the fortification of the forts along the Scheldt river. He took on an advisory role in the Siege of Hulst of 1596 and the Siege of Ostend from 1602 to 1604.

In 1608 he designed together with the municipal surveyor Mattheus van Herle a fortification in the area of the St Michael's Abbey. Around 1614 he made further military maps. During that time he was in charge of inspecting the excavation of the city moats. He discovered that the contractor was making the moats too narrow and tried to cut off some of the corners to save time. He was forced to conduct regular inspections in order to curb these malpractices. During this time he may also have been involved in the reparation of the city walls and the design of a new fort on the left bank of the Scheldt river. In 1618 he discussed with Don Iñigo de Borgia, the commander of the Spanish garrison, the construction of two guard posts on the city walls.

== Sources ==
- Ad Meskens, Practical mathematics in a commercial metropolis: Mathematical life in late 16th century Antwerp, Springer Science & Business Media, 12 Mar 2013
