= Mathys Schoevaerdts =

Flemish painter

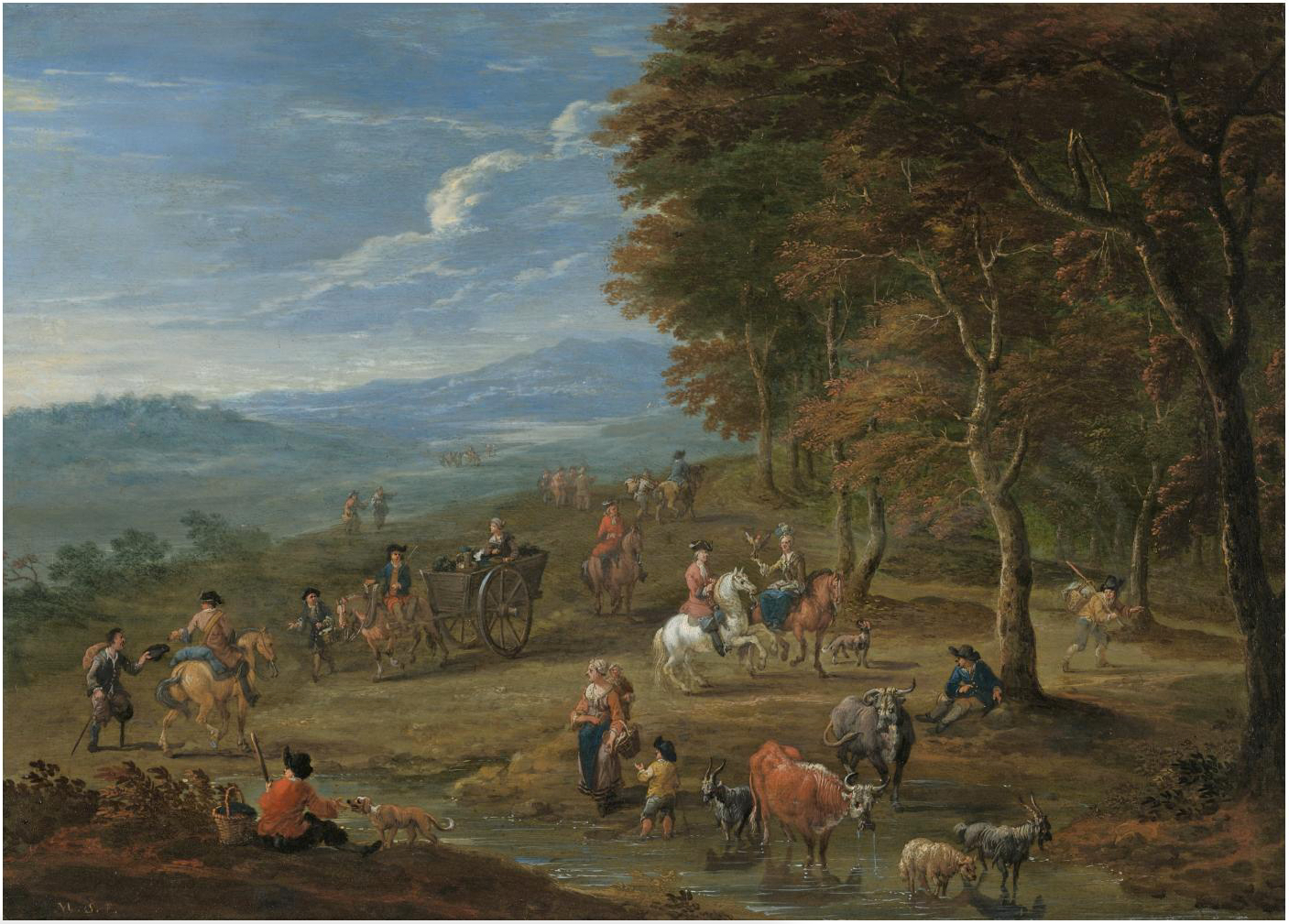
Landscape with travellers passing by the edge of a forest

Mathys Schoevaerdts or Matthijs Schoevaerdts (Brussels 1664; after 1710) was a Flemish painter, draughtsman and printmaker. He is known mainly for his landscapes with trees, marines and genre scenes. He started out in the tradition of Jan Brueghel the Elder and later developed towards an Italianate style.

== Life ==
Details about Schoevaerdts' life are scarce. The earliest records about the artist date from 1682, the year in which he began his apprenticeship with the landscape painter Adriaen Frans Boudewijns.

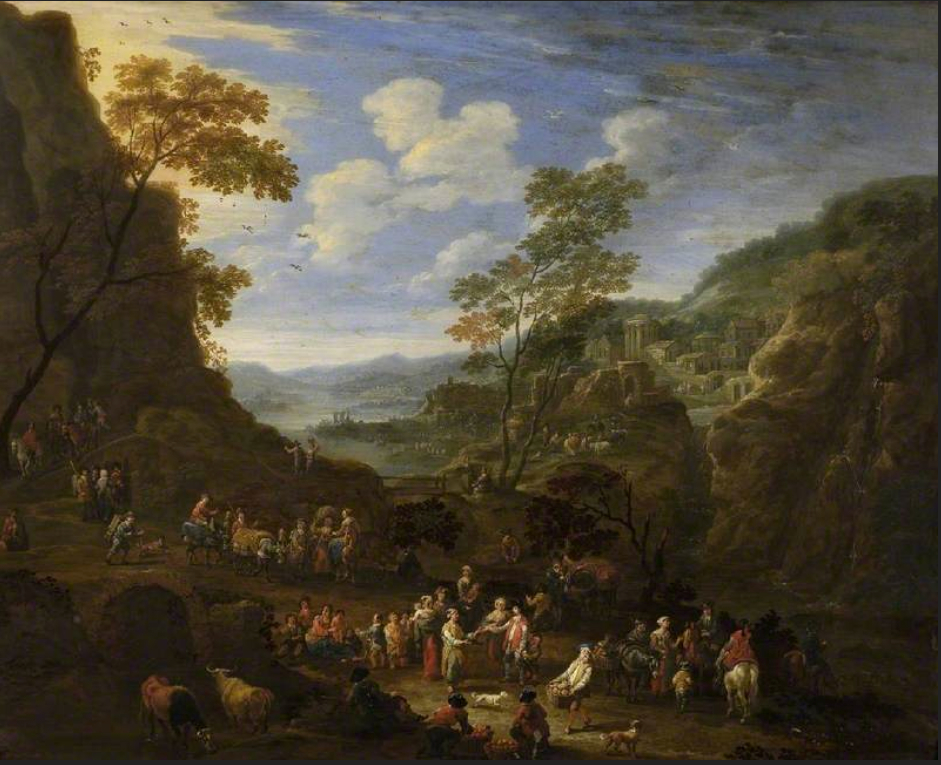
Landscape with a pleasure party

Mathys Schoevaerdts was admitted as a master of the Brussels Guild of Saint Luke in 1690. He served as a Dean of the Guild from 1692 to 1696.

His work was highly appreciated during his lifetime and was widely collected throughout the 18th century. He spent time in the Dutch Republic.

His latest dated work is dated to 1702. It is believed that he died soon thereafter. A document from 1712 states that by then he was dead.

== Work ==
Schoevaerdts is known for his landscape art and genre scenes. His landscapes are full of anecdotes and delicately painted scenes of peasants travelling, sailing or attending kermesses. His early works show the influence of the market views and other crowded scenes of Jan Brueghel the Elder. He had the same preference for the use of delicate light blues and greens as Brueghel. Jan Brueghel the Elder started the tradition of landscape paintings with decorative scenes in the early 17th century. His style had a strong hold well into the 18th century on the next generations of Flemish painters including Izaak van Oosten, Peeter Gijsels, Adriaen Frans Boudewijns, Pieter Bout, various members of the van Bredael family, Balthasar Beschey, Carel Beschey and finally Théobald Michau. Typical of all their landscapes is the bucolic sense of happiness, and their small figures in anecdotic, detailed poses set against a backdrop of a pleasing landscape or buildings.

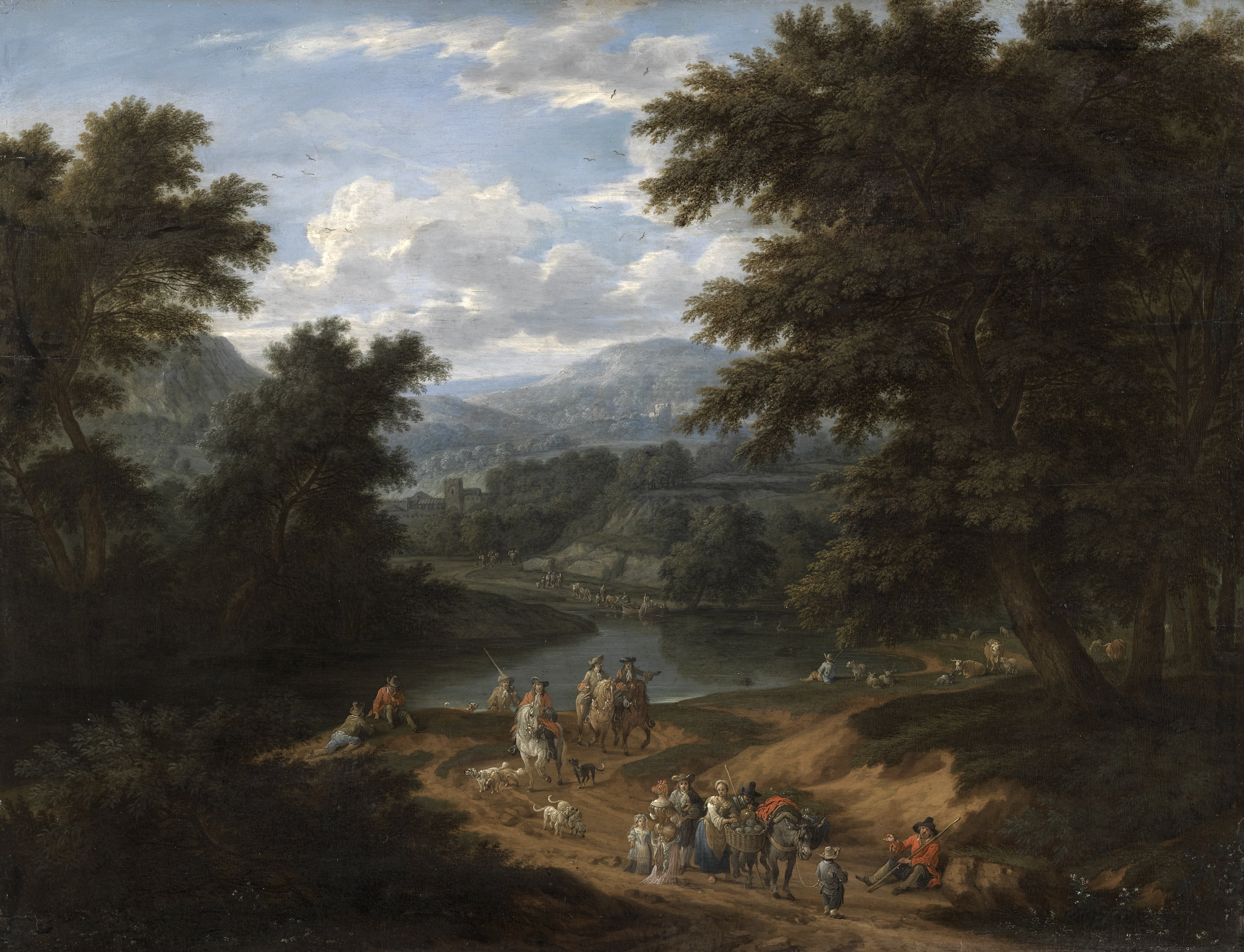
Landscape with travellers on a path

Because of their similarity in subject matter and style, Schoevaerdts' unsigned paintings have been mistaken for those of his master Adriaen Frans Boudewijns and Pieter Bout.

His compositions are typically filled with many figures. The figure groups are individualized and carefully observed. He sometimes introduced elements of fantasy in his compositions by including exotic-looking Turkish merchants into Flemish village scenes. He progressively developed a personal style where the events and scenes depicted are rendered with special accuracy.

Schoevaerdts came later under the influence of the Dutch and Flemish artists who worked in Rome known as the Bamboccianti. He then started to paint landscapes with Italianate ports and ruins. The imaginative ruins or buildings in these landscapes were often decorated with foliage, which emphasises their dilapidated state. He re-used similar figures and architecture in different combinations in his landscapes. These Italianate landscapes revealed increasing depth and delicacy in the handling of the paint. He painted with a bright, clear palette and many of his landscapes include an atmospheric sunset or misty blue mountains in the far distance.

He sometimes collaborated with his teacher Boudewyns and with other artists such as F. Dupont (1660–1712), who provided the figures in his landscapes. His brother, Frans Schoevaerdts, was also a painter active in Brussels in the beginning of the 18th century. The brothers created together lively and animated ideal classical landscapes.

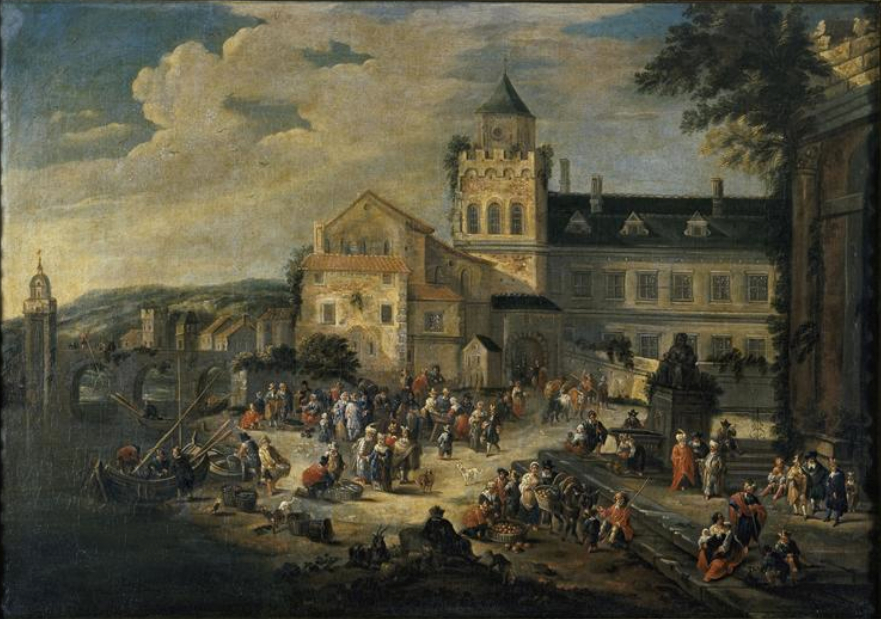
Market on the border of a river

Schoevaerdts' landscapes generally depicted imaginary views. Some more realistic views he painted include capriccio's" of views of Italy, a country that he never visited: one a view of Rome and the other a view of Venice. The artist must have relied on engravings for these more realistically looking landscapes. Schoevaerdts painted one topographical painting representing Maximilian II Emanuel in front of the Palace of Coudenberg of Brussels.

Schoevaerdts also produced a small number of engravings depicting genre scenes. An example is The Game with the Apple.
