= Carel Beschey =

Flemish painter

- Born: 1706; Antwerp
- Died: c. 1770
- Education: Academy of Arts, Antwerp
- Known for: Painting landscapes
- Style: Flemish Baroque (inspired by Jan Brueghel the Elder)
- Parent(s): Jacob Beschey and Maria-Theresia Huaert
- Relatives: Balthasar Beschey (brother), Jacob Andries Beschey (brother), Jan Frans Beschey (brother)

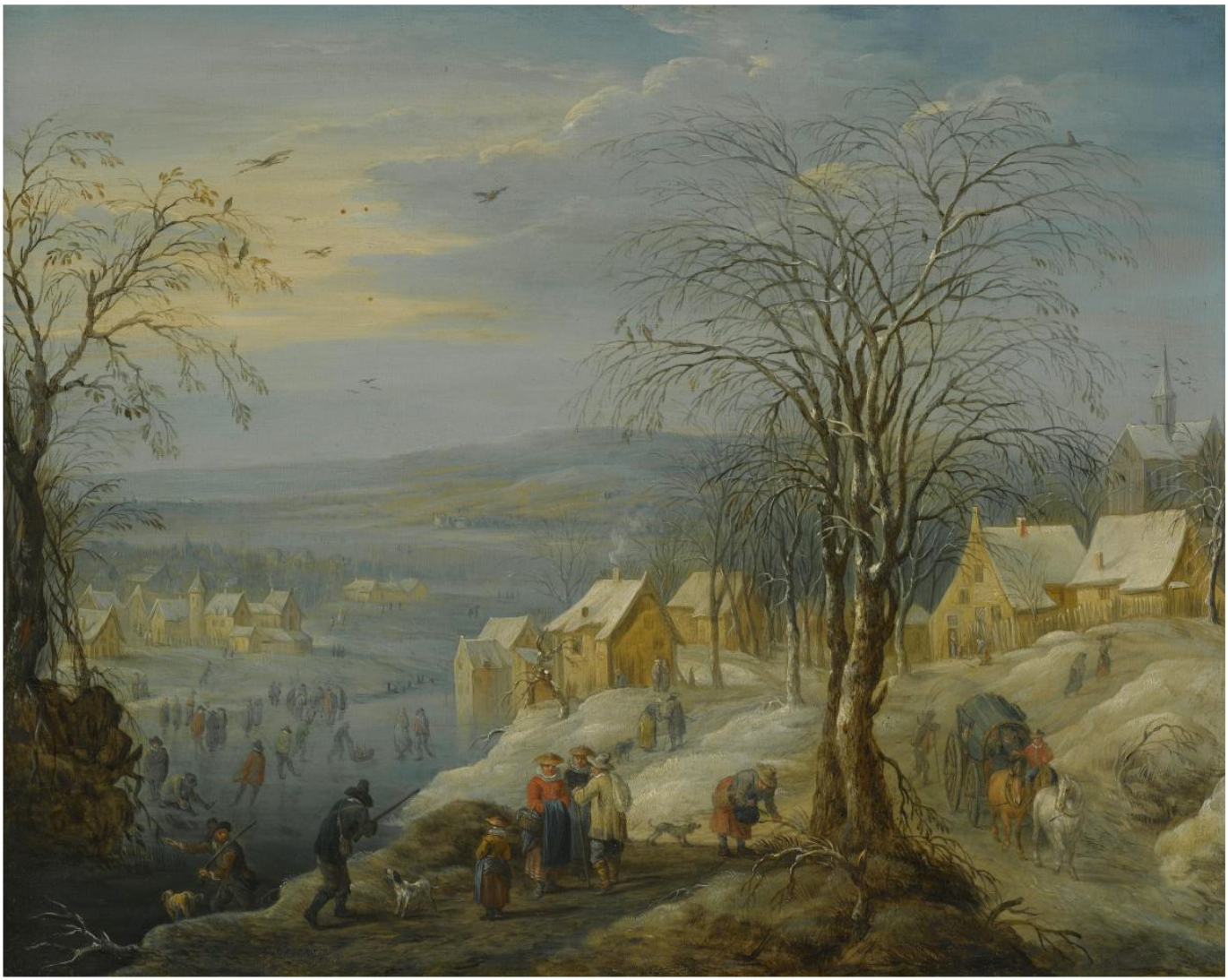
A winter landscape with hunters and skaters

Carel Beschey or Karel Beschey (1706, Antwerp – c. 1770, likely Antwerp) was a Flemish painter and draughtsman who mainly painted landscapes that were in the style of, or inspired by, the Flemish masters of the previous century and in particular Jan Brueghel the Elder (1568 – 1625).

== Life ==
Carel Beschey was born in Antwerp the son of Jacob Beschey and Maria-Theresia Huaert. Carel had three brothers who all became painters. The best known was Balthasar who was a landscape, history and portrait painter. His younger brothers were Jacob Andries, a history painter, and Jan Frans, a copyist and art dealer. Jan Frans was for a while resident as a painter and art dealer in London.

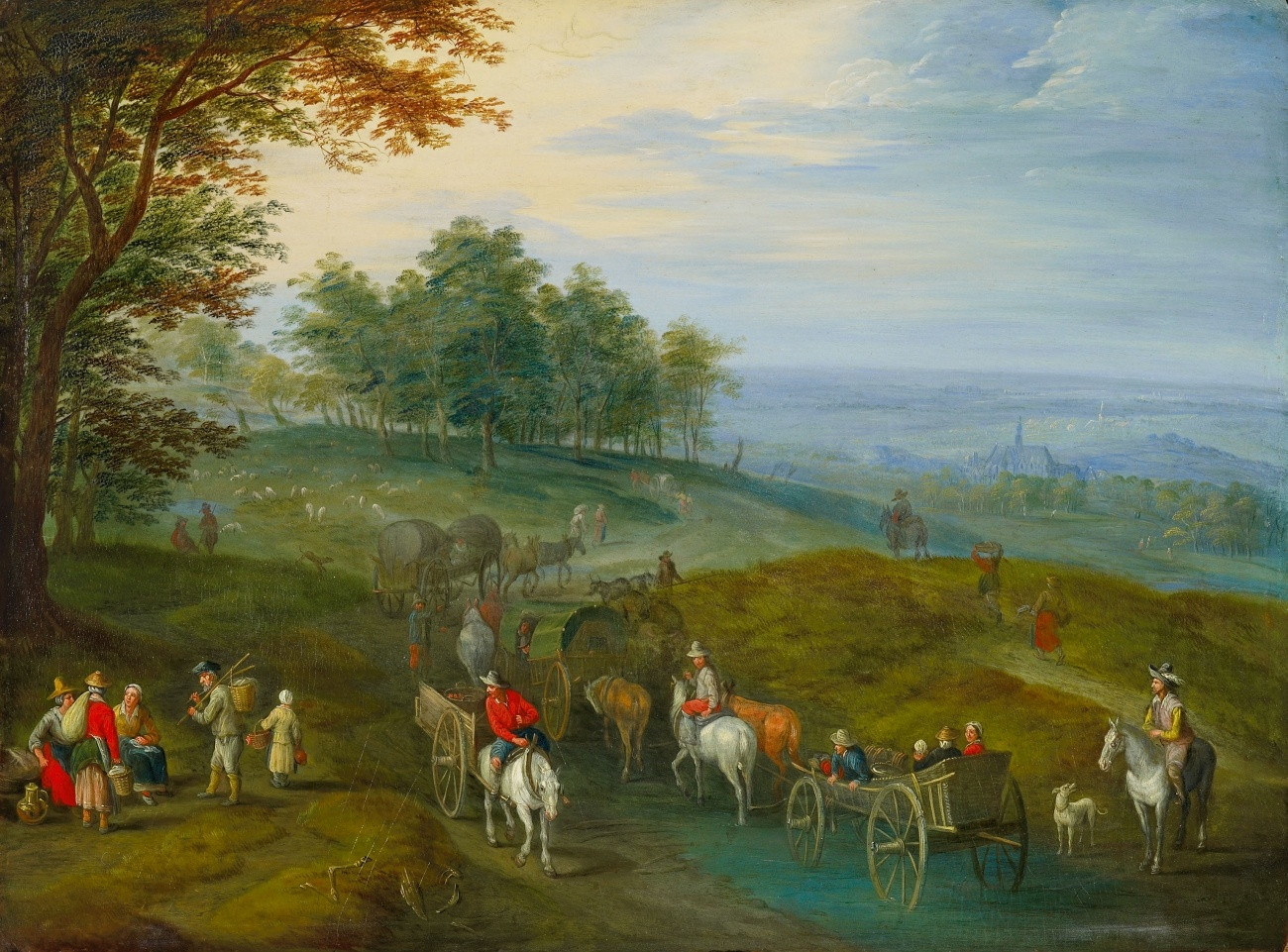
Hilly landscape with travellers

Carel Beschey was a pupil of Hendrick Govaerts. In 1727 he won the first prize in the life drawing competition of the Academy of Arts in Antwerp. Like his brother Balthasar, he became a director of the Academy of Arts of Antwerp.

Thanks to the connections of his younger brother Balthasar who was also an art dealer and portrait painter, Carel Beschey was able to find patrons and buyers for his paintings. At his brother's house, art lovers regularly met up to study the work of the great Dutch and Flemish masters.

It is not known when or where Carel Beschey died but it is assumed he died in Antwerp c. 1770.

== Work ==
Carel Beschey painted mainly landscapes usually with many figures and occasionally with a religious scene. He was one of a number of Antwerp artists from the second half of the 17th century and the first half of the 18th century who painted landscapes in a style reminiscent of earlier Flemish landscape painting. In particular, the work of Jan Brueghel the Elder. These artists included, amongst others, Izaak van Oosten, Peeter Gijsels, Adriaen Frans Boudewyns, Pieter Bout, Joseph van Bredael and his brother Balthasar Beschey. What these artists had in common was that they liked to paint pleasant landscapes with peasant scenes in fresh colours, which exuded a bucolic sense of happiness. Most of their landscapes were populated with small figures in anecdotal poses set against a backdrop of a nice landscape or of some buildings. The preferred palette was pronounced blue-green.

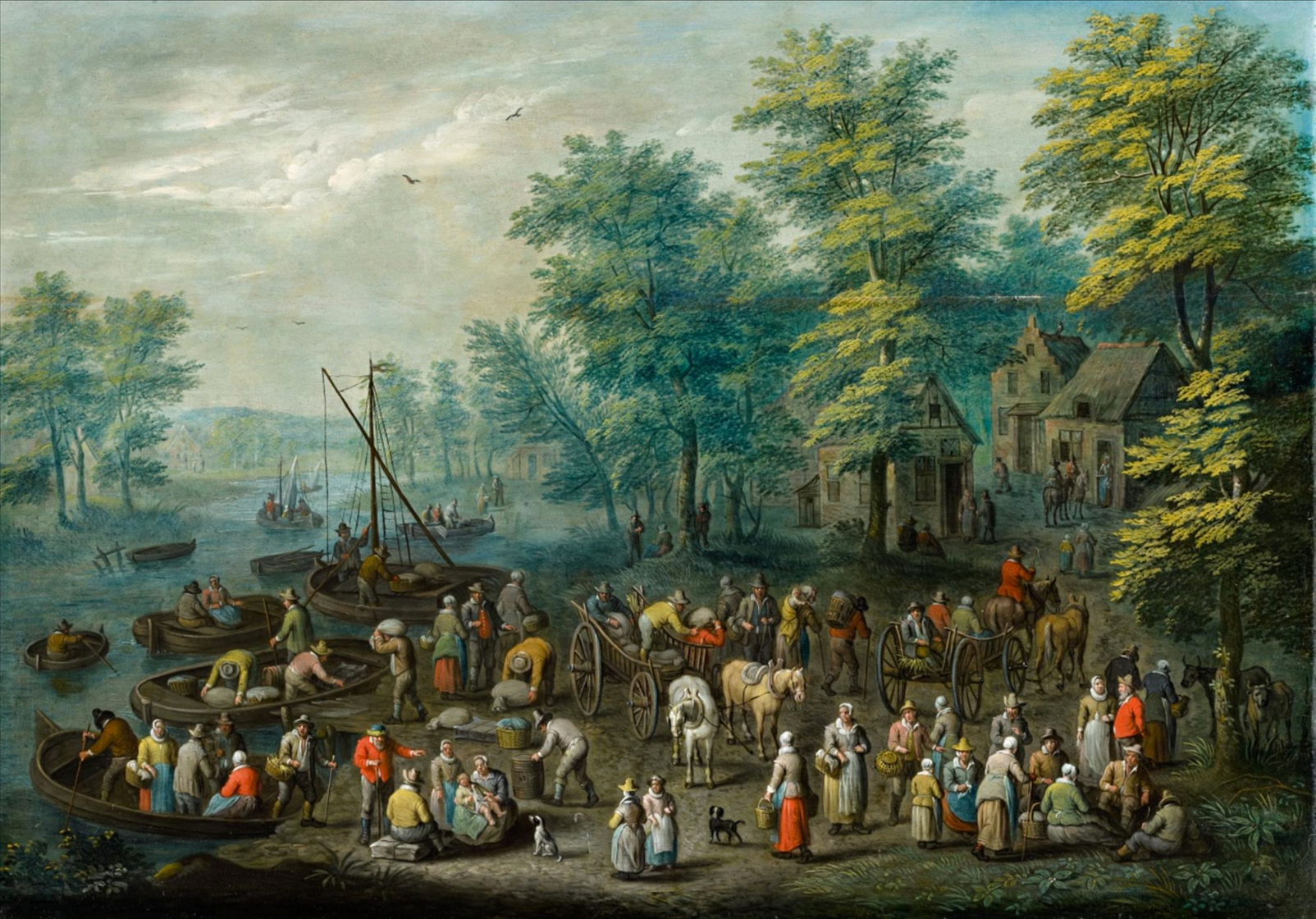
Landscape with figures

The landscapes of Carel Beschey are closely based on the work of Jan Brueghel the Elder. Carel Beschey had a preference for wide, rural landscapes in which the rich scenery with farmers and travellers clearly evokes the model of landscape painting of the 17th century.

Beschey painted a few pairs of winter and summer landscapes. His winter landscapes display a greater level of independence from the Brueghel model. An example is A winter landscape with hunters and skaters on a frozen river running through a village (sold at Sotheby's on 9 December 2009 in London, lot 5).
