= Hendrick Govaerts =

Flemish painter

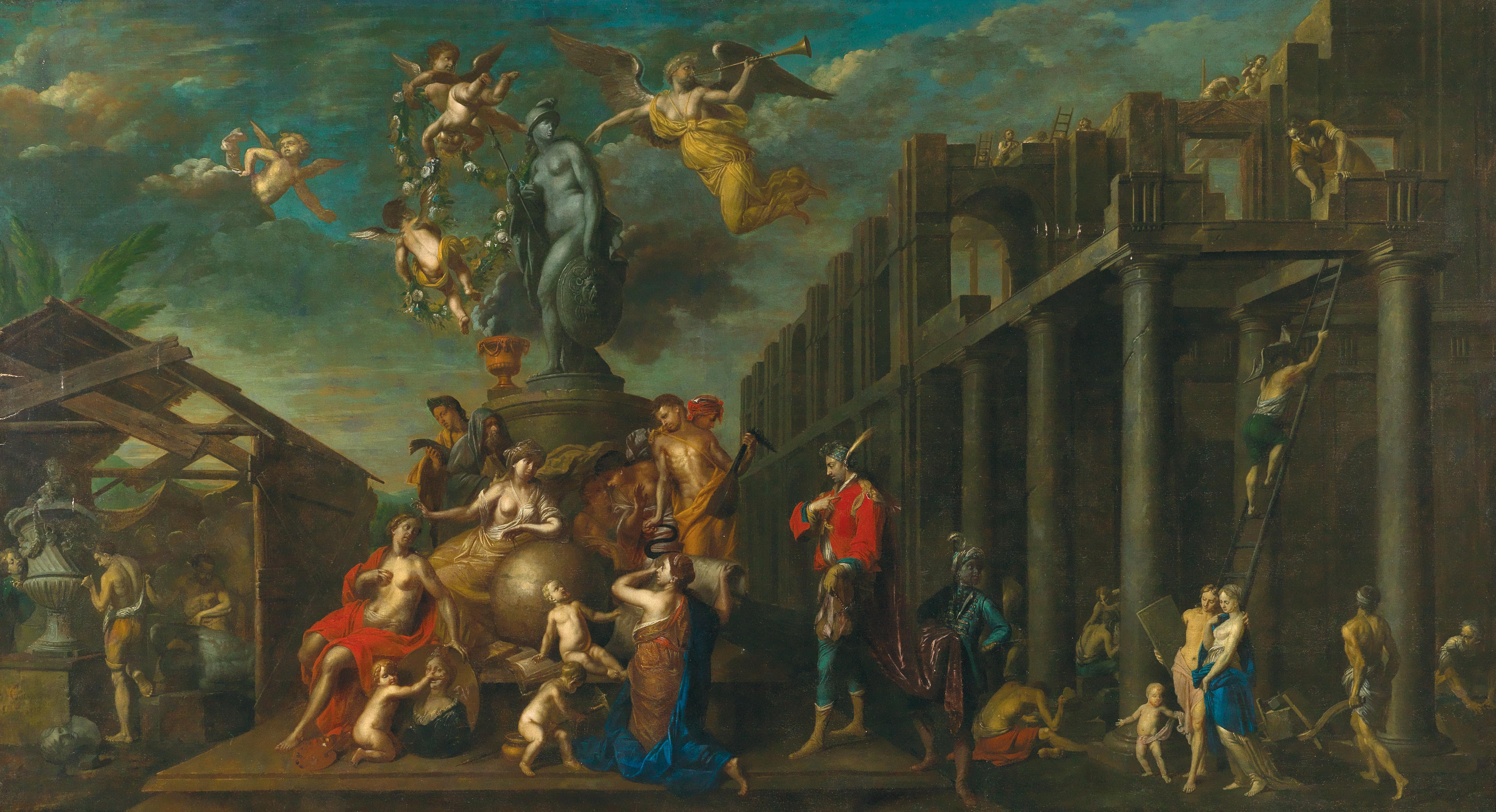
Allegory of the Arts

Hendrick Govaerts or Hendrik Govaerts (baptised 28 February 1669 - 10 February 1720) was a Flemish painter. He is known for his genre scenes of interior scenes, elegant merry companies, theatre scenes, allegories and history paintings. He principally worked in Antwerp except for a period of a few years when he worked in central Europe.

== Life ==
Hendrick Govaerts was born in Mechelen as the son of Peeter Goovaerts and Maria Wagies. He was baptised on 28 February 1680 in the home of his parents. He travelled abroad and is recorded in Frankfurt am Main in 1689 and Prague and Vienna in the period of 1689 - 1690.

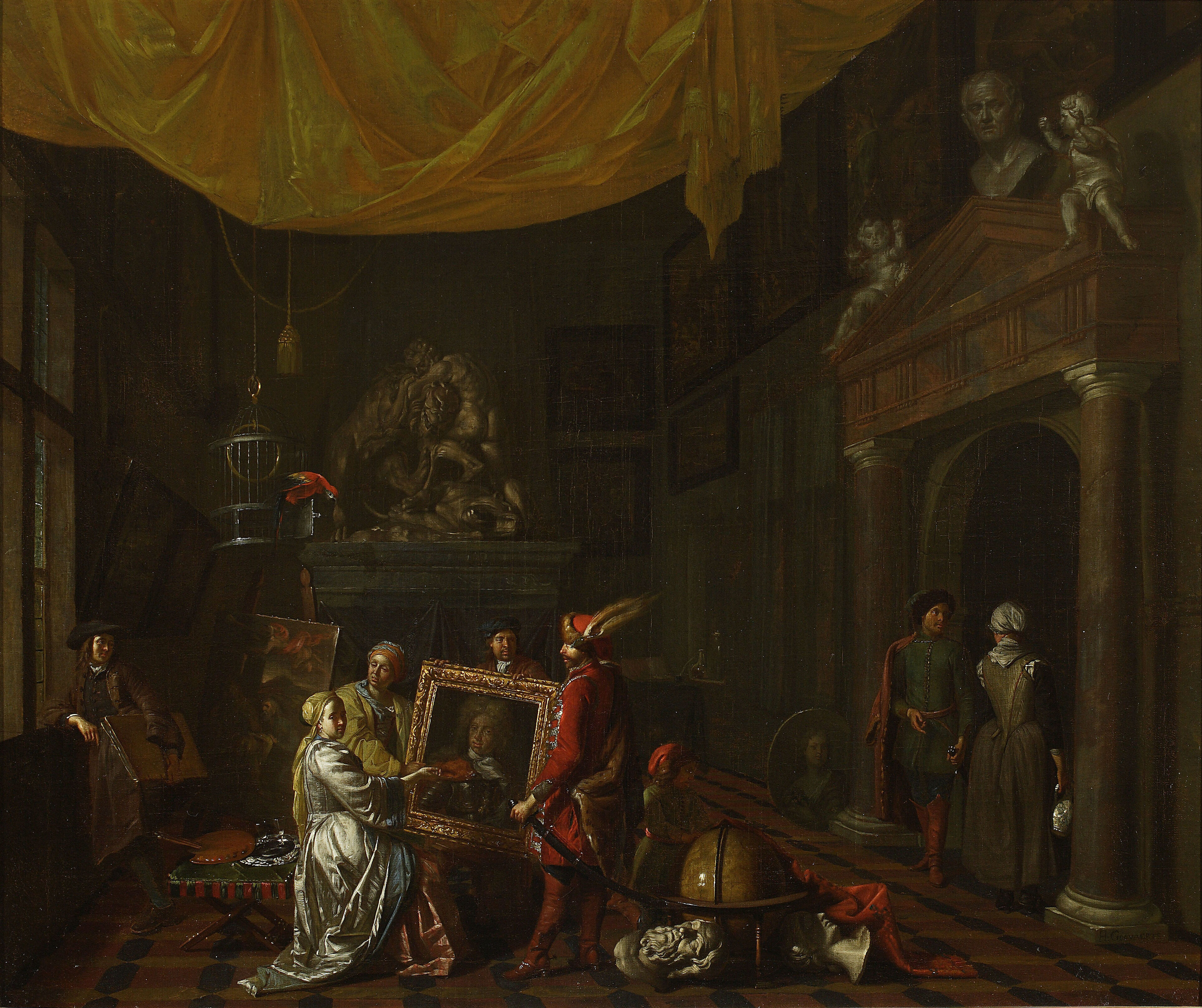
Visit to the painter's studio

He was registered as a master in the Guild of St. Luke of Antwerp between 17 September 1699 and 18 September 1700. On 19 April 1702 he married Petronilla Buys in Antwerp Cathedral. She died not long after and he paid her death duties at the Guild between 18 September 1702 and 18 September 1703. He married a second time on 19 July 1707 to Maria-Anna Bussé. The wedding was also celebrated in Antwerp Cathedral.

His pupils included Carel Beschey, Jan Fransus Martens, Bonaventura Peeters the Younger, Michiel Schalck and Johannes Gellemaerts.

He died after a prolonged illness in his house in the Everdystraet and was buried in the Cathedral on 12 February 1720.

== Work ==
Hendrick Govaerts was mainly a genre painter who is known for his group portraits, allegorical portraits, galant merry company scenes, history paintings, carnival scenes, painter studio and comedia dell'arte subjects. The latter were likely inspired by his stay in Prague and Vienna where he may have visited the then budding theatre scene which had become part of court life. He often appears to stage his compositions as if they represent theatrical performances in which the figures are actors. He was called the "Flemish Longhi" because of the light brush and bright color of his works.

His merry company scenes typically depict elegantly dressed people entertaining themselves with music, dance, masquerades, theatre performances etc. in a theatrical setting either outdoors among monumental ruins or indoors in grand ballrooms with high ceilings and monumental sculptures. An example is Party with Music and Actors Entertaining the Company (c. 1710, Wellcome Library) attributed to Govaerts. It shows an elegant party in a grand hall with monumental arcades and columns. A band is playing music while actors parody the antics of Italian medicine vendors and quack doctors as entertainment for the company.

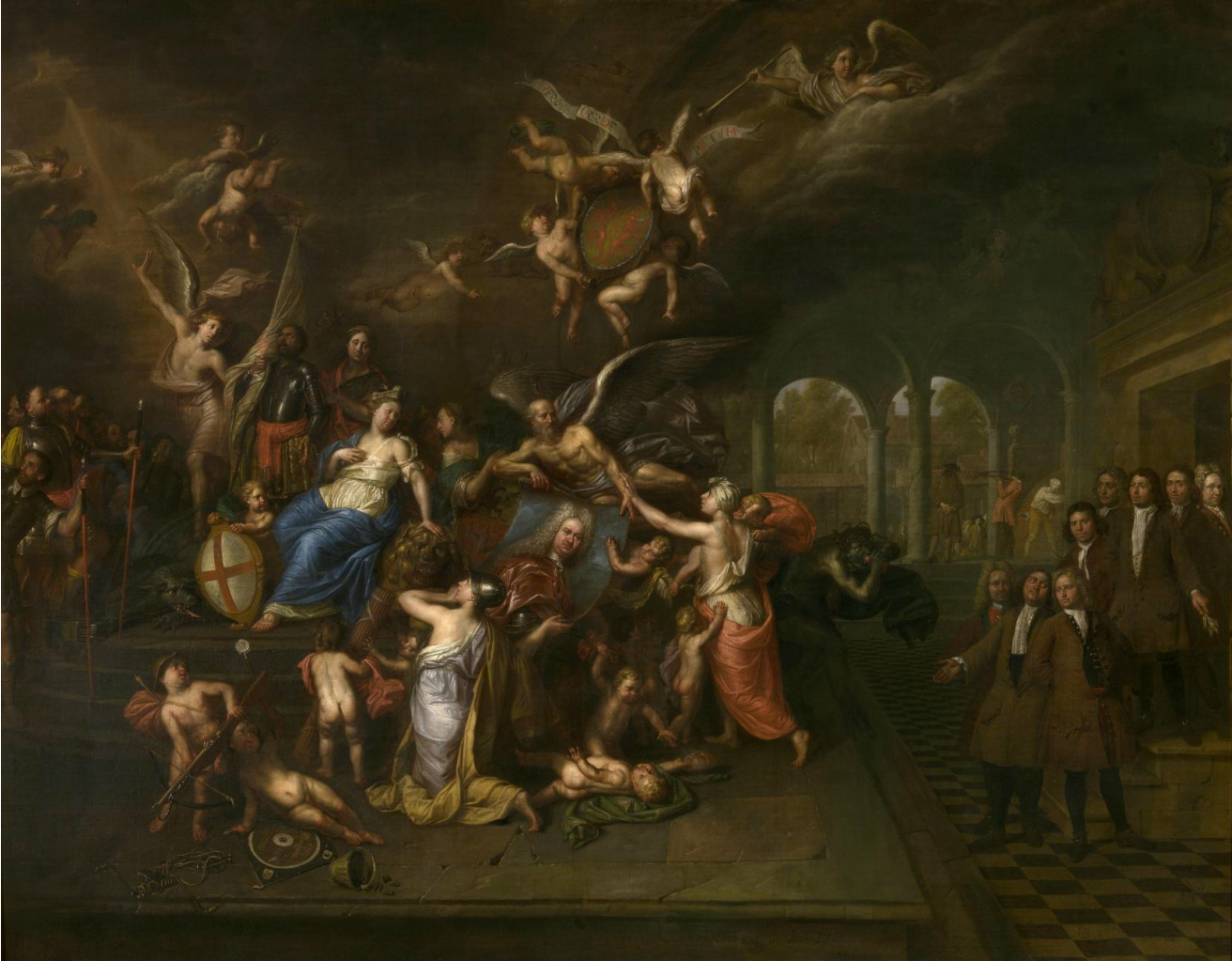
The Guild of the Crossbow Venerates the Portrait of Headman Jan Karel de Cordes

Another subject that Govaerts returned to a few times is that of the artist's studio. An example is the Visit to the painter's studio in the National Museum, Warsaw. It depicts a rich patrician interior, illuminated on the left by high, double windows, decorated with a monumental portal and a sculptural group of Hercules fighting a Nemean lion, situated above the fireplace. This room is the painter's studio which is at the same time a gallery in which he exhibits his paintings for sale. A group of visitors are viewing a portrait in a rich, gilded frame. Two officers in exotic Polish-Hungarian costumes attract attention among visitors to the studio. The painting belongs to the genre of images of galleries and collectors' offices popular in the mid-17th century and of which David Teniers the Younger was one of the principal practitioners.

Govaerts painted various allegories, including allegories of the arts, and allegorical portraits. In these works he presents the subjects as if they are actors in a theatrical performance. One of his most remarkable allegories is The Guild of the Crossbow Venerates the Portrait of Headman Jan Karel de Cordes (1711, Royal Museum of Fine Arts Antwerp). The Guild of the Crossbow was part of the civic guard in Antwerp and Govaerts had painted the work as a gift to be exempted from his duties as a civil guard. He combined in the canvas the most disparate images and themes. A winged figured of an old man, who symbolises time, carries a portrait of the headman of the Guild and shows it to the 'virgin' of Antwerp, who is surrounded by angels and various allegorical figures. This scene with putti floating in the air carrying the armor of the headman is set on a kind of platform as if it were a theatrical stage. On the right hand side of the painting the instigators of the allegorical scene are shown thus making clear that all of it is just a fabrication. These instigators are a number of well-dressed 18th century gentlemen who are approaching the allegorical scene from the left. The allegorical figure of envy biting on a heart in the center of the painting bridges the allegorical scene and these men.
