= Jacob Andries Beschey =

Flemish painter

Jacob Andries Beschey (1710 in Antwerp – 1786 in Antwerp) was a Flemish painter and draughtsman who mainly painted religious paintings that were in the style of, or inspired by, Peter Paul Rubens.

== Life ==
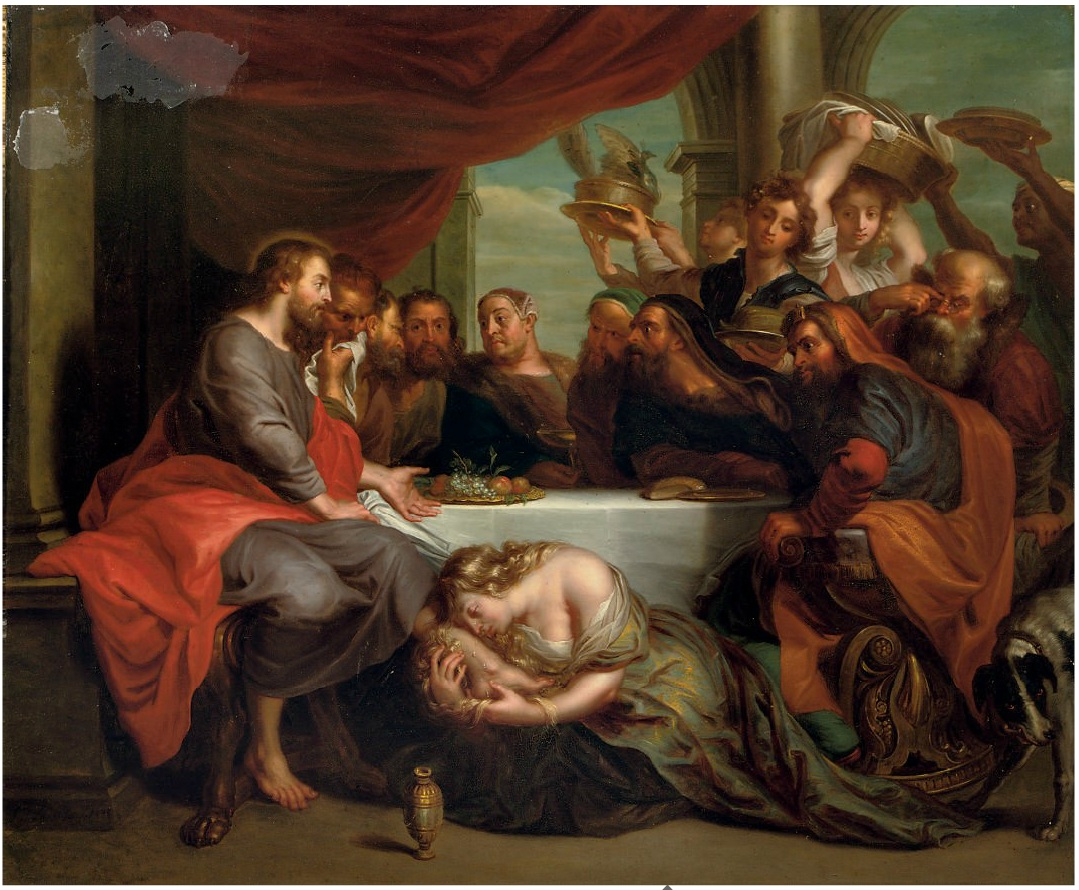
Maria Magdalene washing the feet of Christ

Jacob Andries Beschey was born in Antwerp as the son of Jacob Beschey and Maria-Theresia Huaert. He was baptized in the Cathedral of Our Lady in Antwerp on 30 November 1710. Jacob Andries had four brothers who all became painters. The best known were his elder brothers Carel who was a landscape painter and Balthasar who was a landscape, history and portrait painter. His younger brothers were Jan Frans, a sometime resident in London as a painter and art dealer, and Jozef Hendrik, a portrait painter active under the pseudonym Francis Lindo in England.

Nothing is known about the training of Jacob Andries Beschey. He became a master in the Antwerp Guild of Saint Luke in 1726–27 and was the dean of the Guild in 1766–67.

Jacob Andries Beschey was also involved in art dealing for which he could rely on the connections with his brother in England.

He was the teacher of Philips Bonnecroy (III) (1732–33), Balthasar Beschey II and Antonie Verbruggen (1753) and Petrus Sneyders en Guiglielmus Claessens (1754). It is possible that his nephew, also called Balthasar, who was the son of his brother Joseph Hendrik active in England, was his pupil.

Beschey died in Antwerp on 28 February 1786.

== Work ==
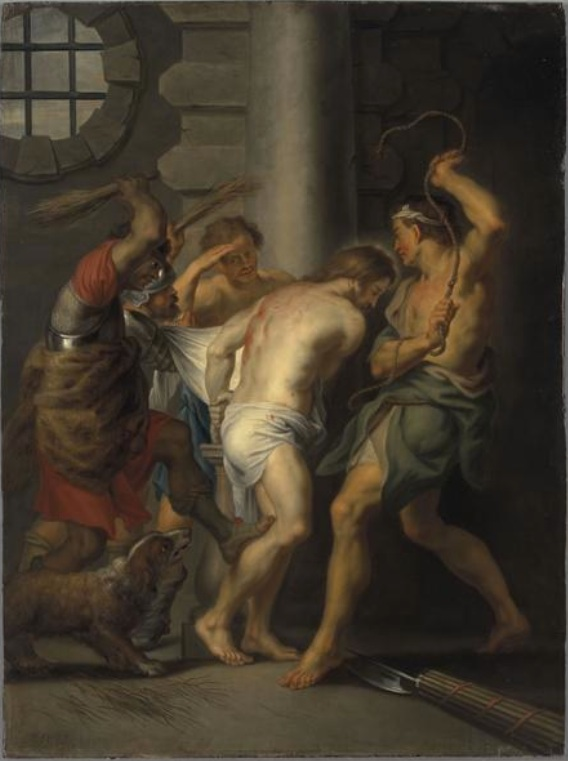
The flaggelation of Christ

Jacob Andries Beschey painted mainly religious subjects and to a lesser extent landscapes. He possibly also painted still lifes. There is mention of a hunting piece in 1945 but it is not clear where this work is located and what was the basis for the attribution.

Most of his work was inspired by the compositions of Rubens or followers of Rubens, which he may have known directly or from prints. An example is the Maria Magdalene washing the feet of Christ (Sold at Christie's 13 April 2010 in Amsterdam, lot 92) signed and dated 1735. The picture is a mirror copy of a composition executed mainly by Anthony van Dyck together with Rubens that is in the Hermitage Museum and was based on a sketch by Rubens. The composition was known at the time through a print by the Flemish engraver Michel Natalis. It was popular with followers of Rubens and a very similar mirror version was made earlier by Victor Wolfvoet II.

The composition The Rest on the Flight into Egypt (sold at Bonhams 2 May 2012 in London, lot 60) goes back to an initial design by Giuseppe Bartolomeo Chiari, which was later reprised by Lorenzo Masucci for the Santa Maria dell'Orazione e Morte church in Rome. This was a popular composition known through many versions, both by Chiari and Masucci, which all follow the same pattern but with differences in some details. Beschey's paintings are often on a small format.

Some of the prominent museums that hold compositions by Beschey are the Hermitage Museum (Christ and his Disciples in Emmaus), the Alte Pinakothek (The flaggelation of Christ) and the Prado Museum (The raising of the cross).
