= Adriaen Frans Boudewijns =

Flemish landscape painter, draughtsman and etcher

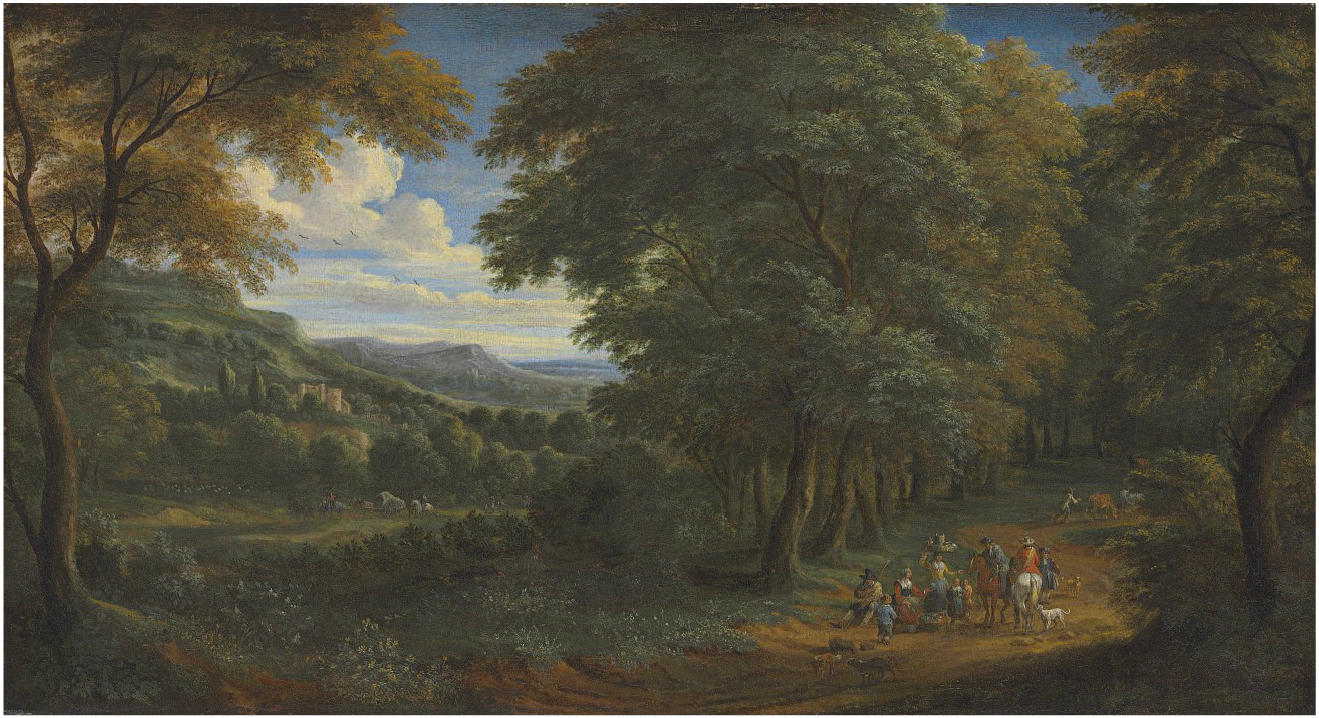
Wooded landscape with horsemen greeting travelers on a path

Adriaen Frans Boudewijns (Brussels, 3 October 1644 – Brussels, 3 December 1719) was a Flemish landscape painter, draughtsman and etcher. He was known mainly for his landscapes with trees, Italianate landscapes with architecture, rivers and villages, city, coast and country views and architectural scenes.

== Life ==
Adriaen Frans Boudewijns was born in Brussels where he was baptized in the St Nicolas Church on 3 October 1644. He was the son of Nicolas Boudewijns and Françoise Jonquin. He married Louise de Ceul on 5 October 1664. The couple likely remained childless. On 23 November 1665 he was registered at the same time as a pupil and master of the Brussels Guild of Saint Luke. He was a pupil of the landscape painter and engraver Ignatius van der Stock.

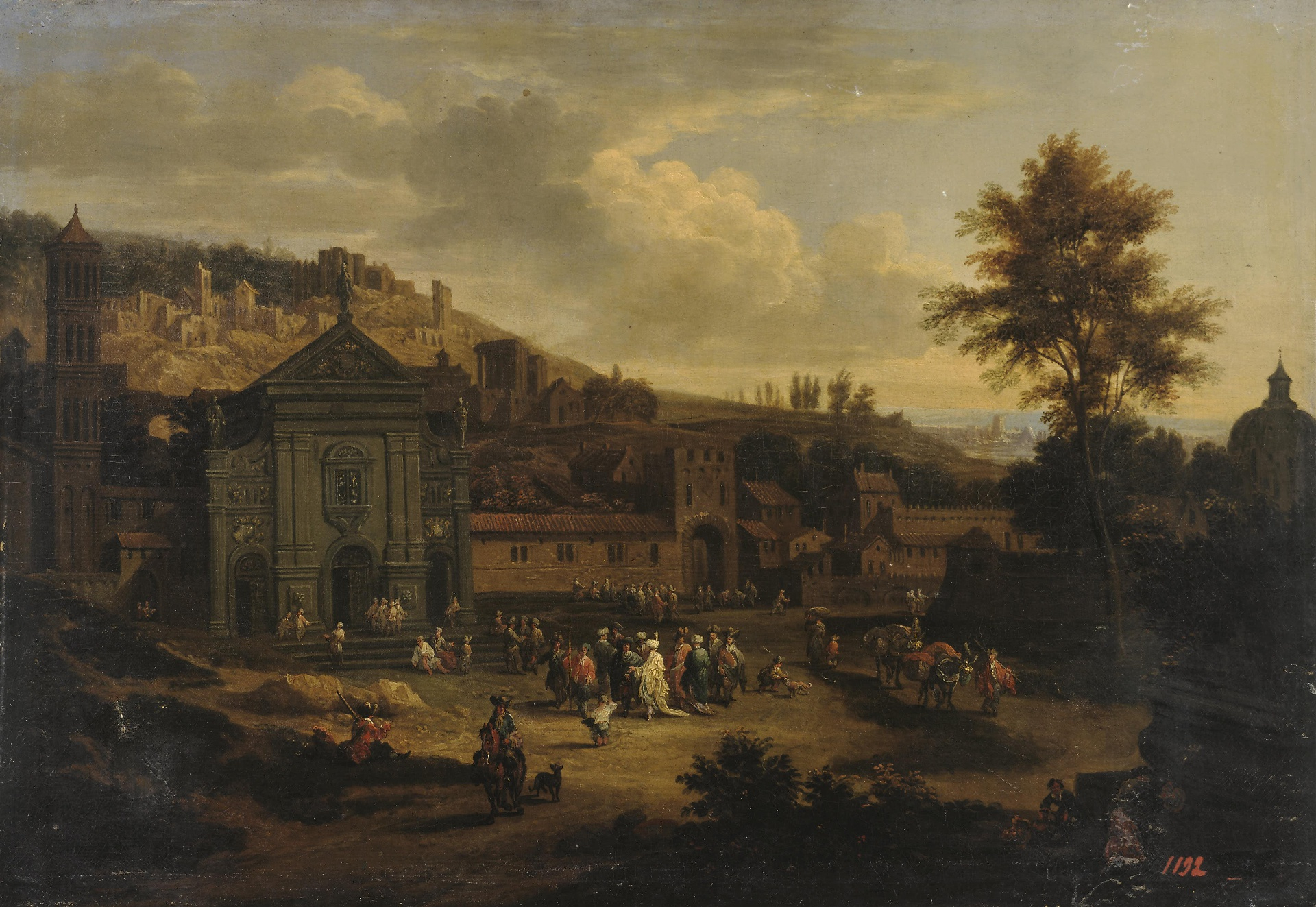
Square in a seaside town, with Pieter Bout

On 16 December 1666 Boudewijns is recorded in Paris when he entered into a 3-year contract to work in the service of the Flemish painter Adam Frans van der Meulen. He is recorded as working with van der Meulen on the design of 12 Gobelins representing the months for French King Louis XIV. Van der Meulen executed the smaller figures and part of the landscapes. The remainder of the landscapes was completed by Boudewijns and Abraham Genoels, another Flemish painter active in Paris.

Boudewijns also travelled with Genoels to make sketches of a castle near Brussels for a design of a tapestry for the King of France. While in Paris, Boudewijns engraved many of van der Meulen's compositions. He also made engravings after the work of Genoels, the Dutch artist Jan van Hughtenburgh and his own designs.

Boudewijns married the sister of Adam Frans van der Meulen called Barbe or Barbara on 12 January 1670. The couple had two children of whom the oldest named Frans became a painter. Barbe Boudewijns died on 2 March 1674. Around this time Boudewijns must have returned home. He is documented in Brussels in 1677 when he was present at the baptism of his nephew Adriaen Frans on 4 June 1677. He married a third time in Brussels in 1670.

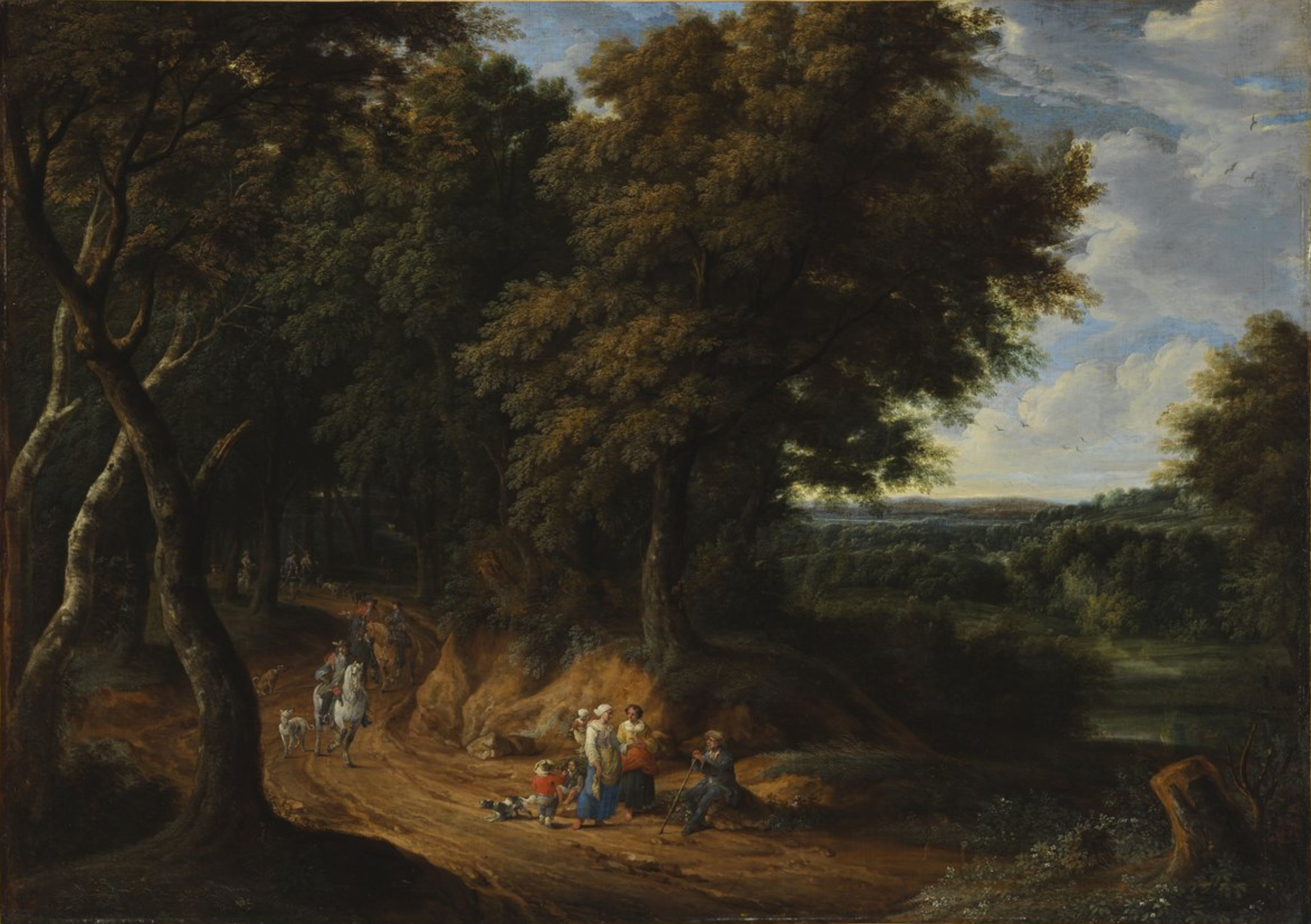
Path in the forest

He had a studio in Brussels where he received in 1682 Andreas Meulebeek as his pupil and the next year Mathys Schoevaerdts. His nephew Adriaen (Frans) became his pupil in 1694. He also trained his son Frans.

It is believed that he was ruined during the bombardment of Brussels, the vicious artillery bombardment of Brussels carried out by French troops on 13, 14 and 15 August 1695 which caused the destruction of a third of the buildings in Brussels.

He died in Brussels on 3 December 1719.

== Works ==
=== General ===
Boudewijns was a landscape artist who produced paintings, drawings and prints. All surviving paintings are believed to have been painted after his return to Brussels from Paris. From his Paris years are mainly known his tapestry designs, drawings and engravings. Only a few of his paintings are dated.

He often collaborated with other specialist painters who added the figures in his landscapes. Collaborations with Charles Emmanuel Biset, Pointié Dupont, his pupil Matthys Schoevaerdts and most frequently Pieter Bout are recorded.

=== Paintings ===
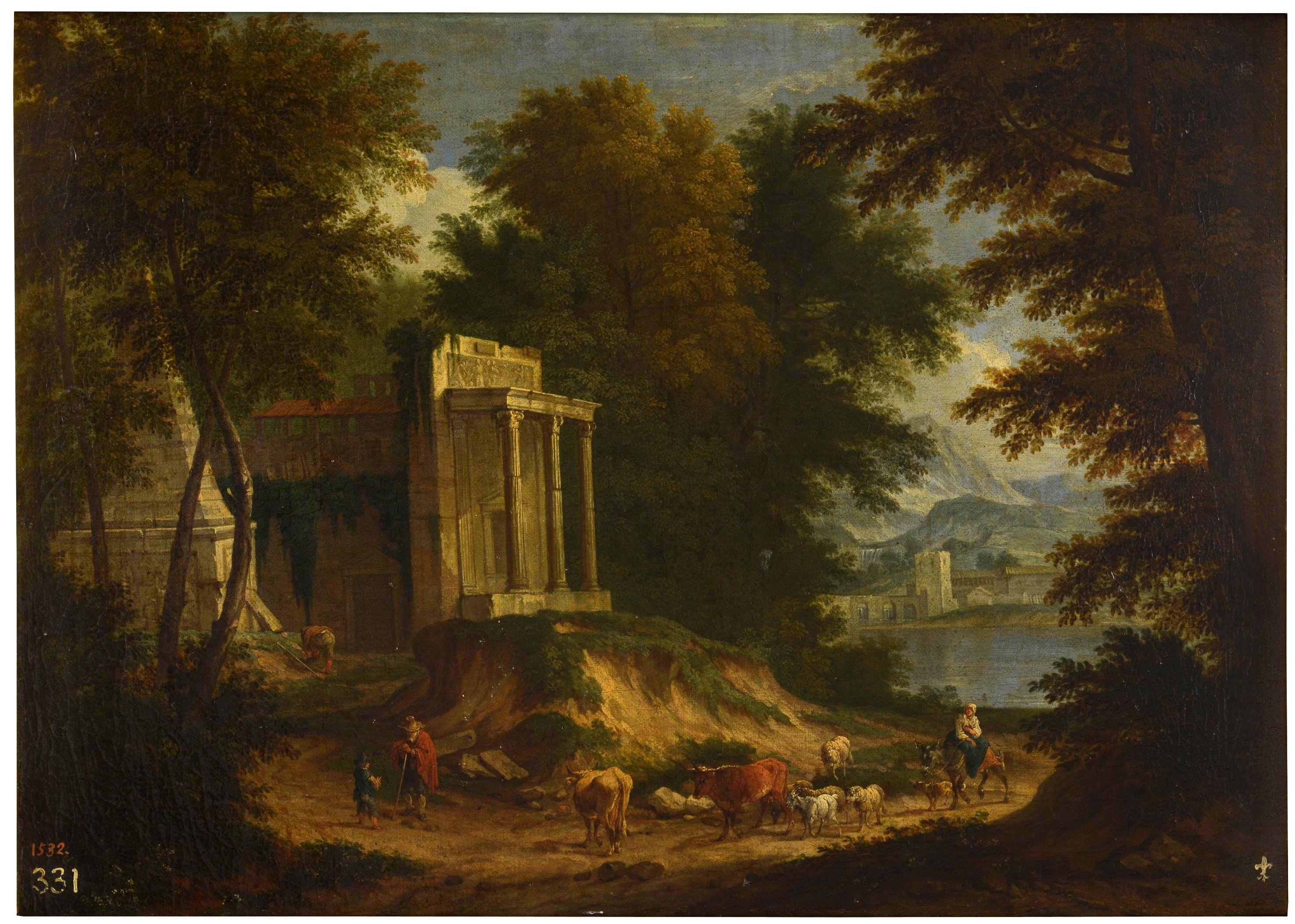
Landscape with ruins

Boudewijns' work combines the Northern tradition of landscape painting with the Roman classicism exemplified by Claude Lorrain and Poussin. His landscapes often show landscapes bathed in a bright southern glow, occasionally with an ancient architectural element, against a lively and naturalist sky with clouds. These Classical idealized landscapes became Boudewijns' trademark. His meticulous rendering of trees shows the influence of Gaspard Dughet. All his landscapes are meticulously painted and often peopled with figures painted by Pieter Bout.

The landscapes of Boudewijns can generally be divided into three types. The first type resembles the work of the Sonian Forest school of landscape painters such as Jacques d'Arthois and Cornelis Huysmans. These painters from Brussels had a preference for depicting sand flats with deep lying roads surrounded by trees. These compositions show the landscapes in a bright light. A second type of landscape depicts Italianate architectural elements set in a flat landscape with a row of hills as a backdrop. Finally, he made a number of village and river landscapes that recall the style of Jan Brueghel the Elder in compositional structure and technical precision.

=== Prints ===
Boudewijns' many prints were based on paintings or designs of Adam Frans van der Meulen, Abraham Genoels and on his own designs.
