= Pieter Bout =

Flemish painter, draughtsman and etcher

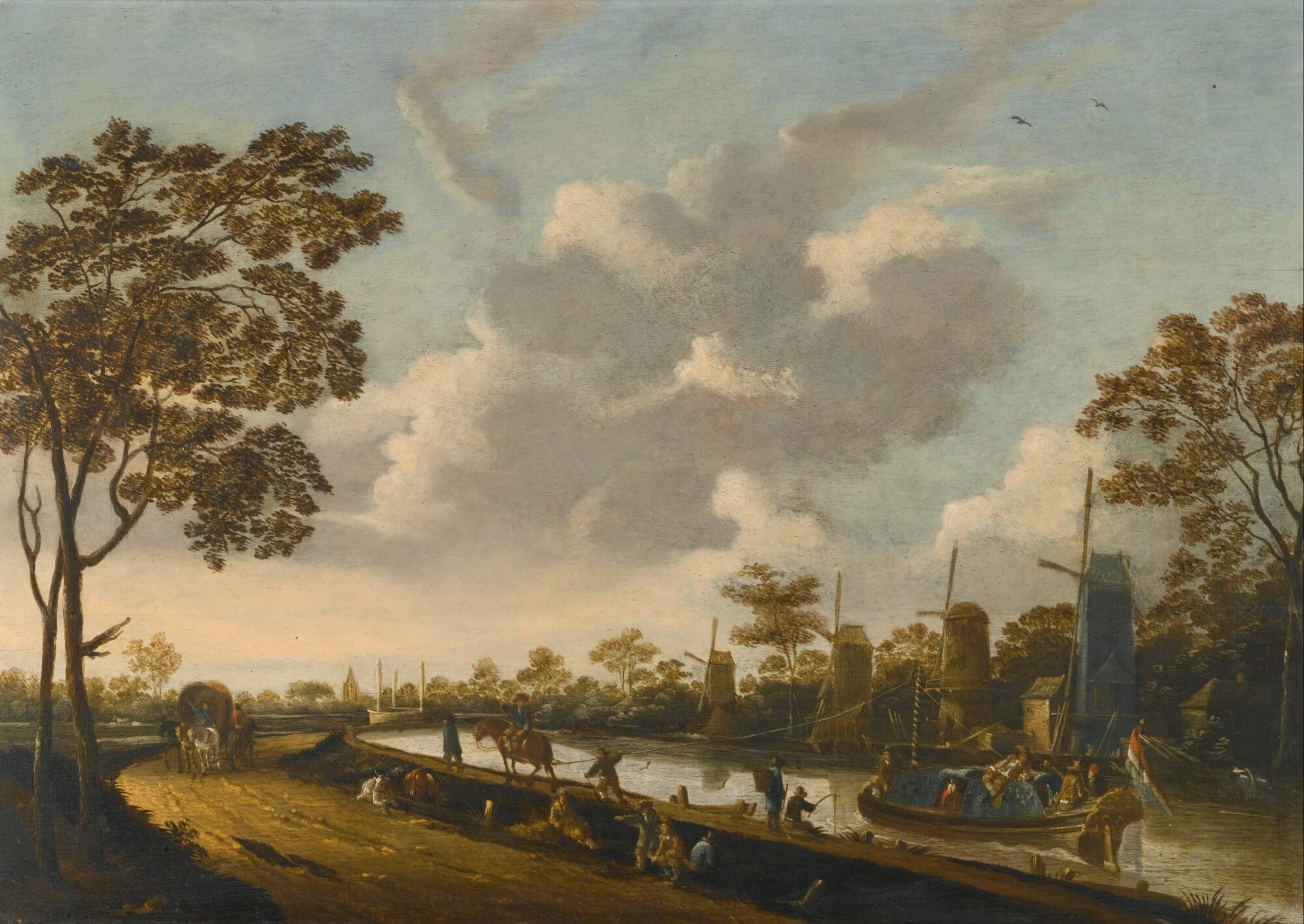
Landscape with a Barge Being Towed along a Canal

Pieter Bout (between 1640 and 1645 – between 17 June 1689 and 1719) was a Flemish painter, draughtsman and printmaker. He is known mainly for his landscapes, city, coast and country views and architectural scenes painted in a style reminiscent of earlier Flemish masters such as Jan Brueghel the Elder. His clear and soft palette announces the 18th century.

== Life ==
Even while Pieter Bout was well known in his time as demonstrated by his frequent collaborations with prominent Flemish painters and his substantial output, the details of his life are not very well established. He was probably born in Brussels somewhere between 1640 and 1645. He is not identical to a Pieter Bout who was baptized in Brussels on 5 December 1658, as is erroneously stated in most sources on the artist.

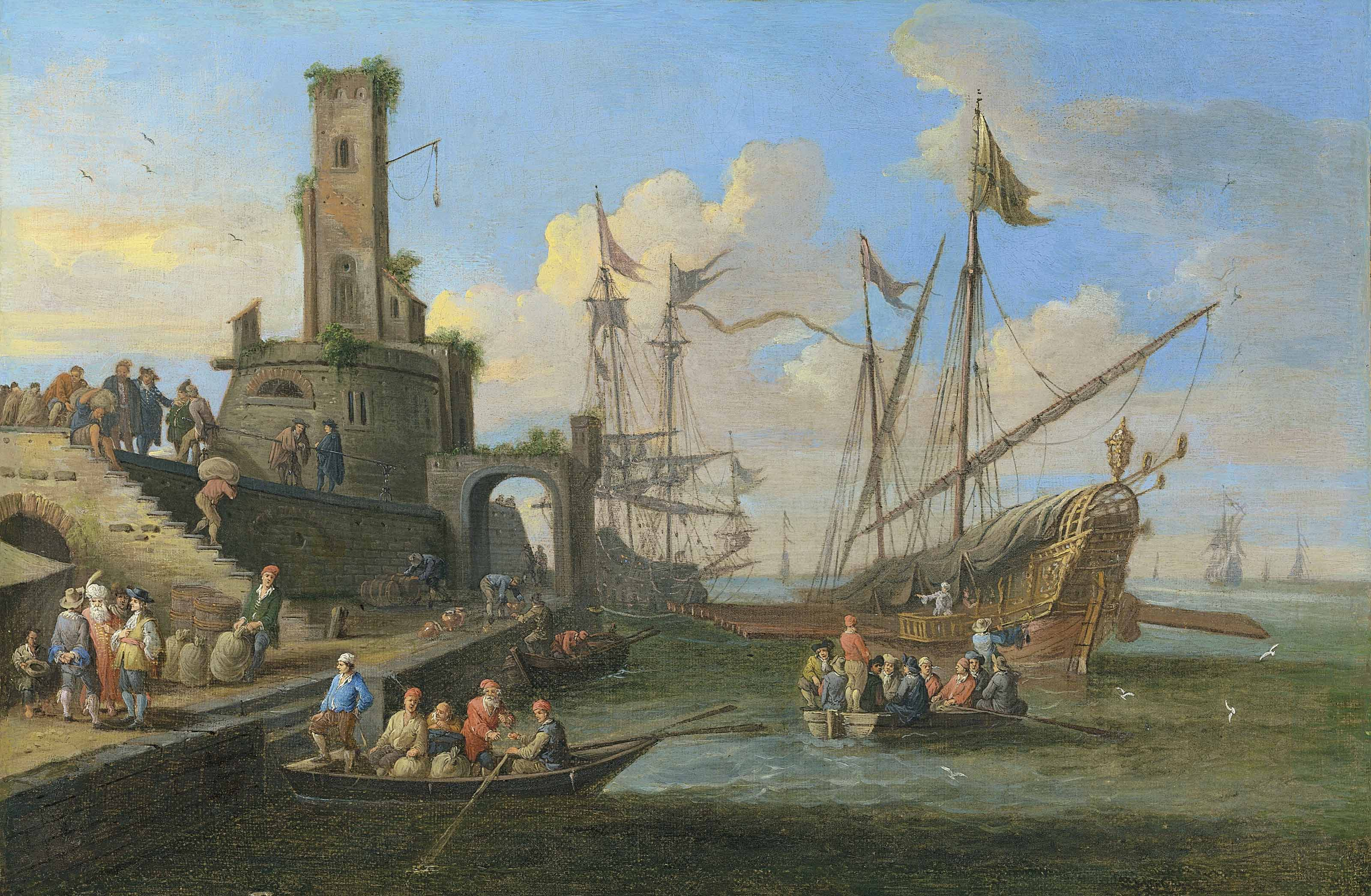
Mediterranean harbour scene

It is not known with whom he studied. He became a master in the Brussels Guild of Saint Luke in 1671 but his earliest work is dated 1664 and therefore predates his admission as a master in the Guild. On 30 November 1667, he married Joanna Garnevelt (baptized 22 October 1628-buried 29 November 1713) in the Church of St. Michael and St. Gudula in Brussels. His wife was 39 at the time of the wedding. Through this marriage he became the stepfather of the printmaker Franciscus de Bargas.

Although primary sources do not confirm this, it is believed that from c. 1675 to 1677 Bout worked in Paris where he frequently collaborated with Adriaen Frans Boudewyns, a Flemish painter who resided at the time in Paris where he worked for the Gobelins Manufactory tapestry workshop. Bout returned to Brussels in 1677, where he married a second time on 9 August 1695. He remained acti

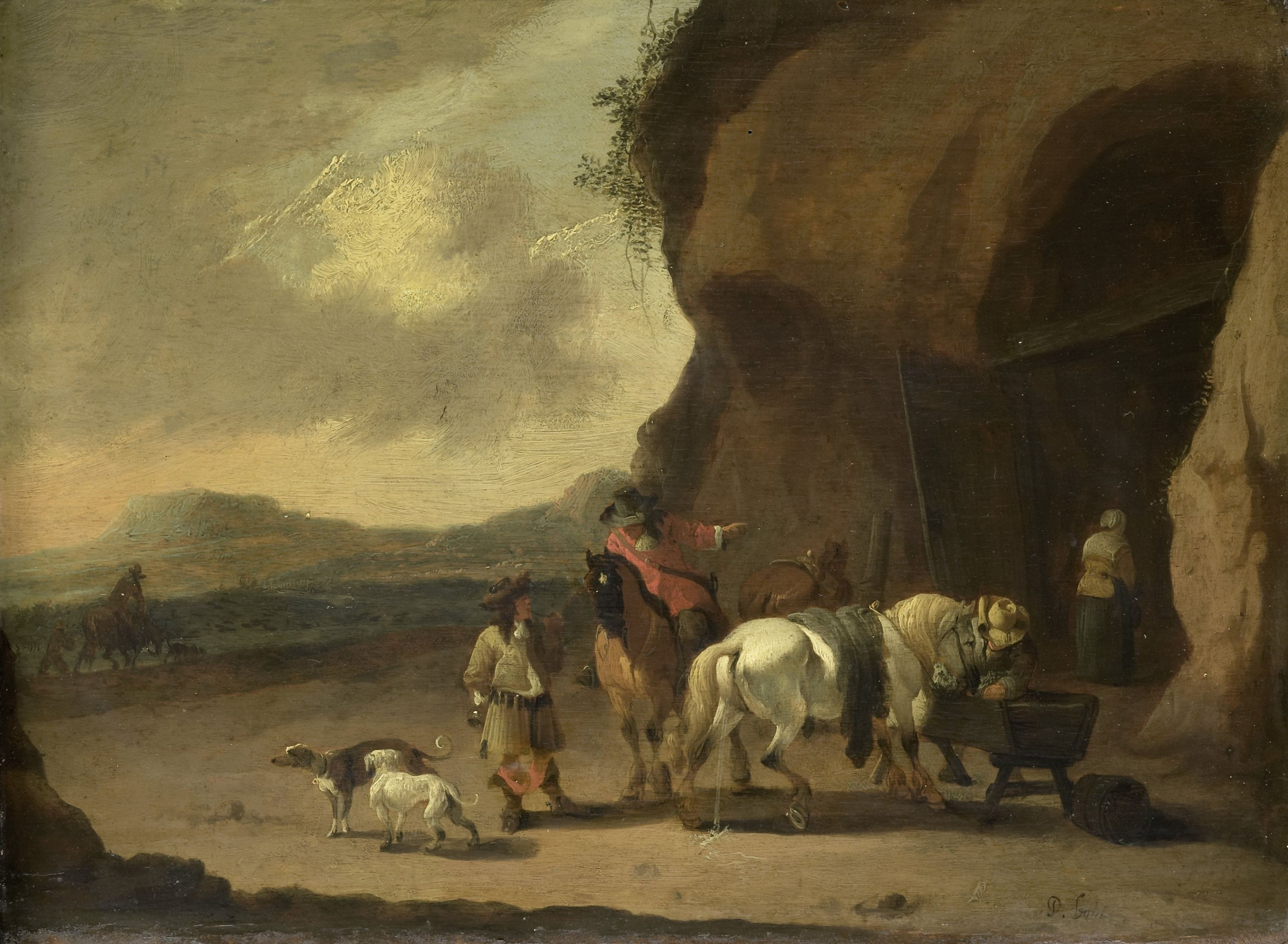
The Way Station

The time of his death is not known with certainty. One source states that the artist made his will on 17 June 1689 as he was ill and was buried two days later in Brussels. Other sources claim he died in 1702 or 1719.

== Work ==
Pieter Bout was a very prolific artist who worked in many genres. Most of his works include a landscape element and many are views of cities, villages, ports, beaches or rivers. His views are in the tradition of Jan Brueghel the Elder. They also show similarity to the work of David Teniers the Younger and the landscapes of Brussels landscape painters such as Adriaen Frans Boudewyns, Lucas Achtschellinck and Jacques d'Arthois, for whom he also often painted the staffage. He further painted Italianate landscapes in the manner of Nicolaes Berchem.

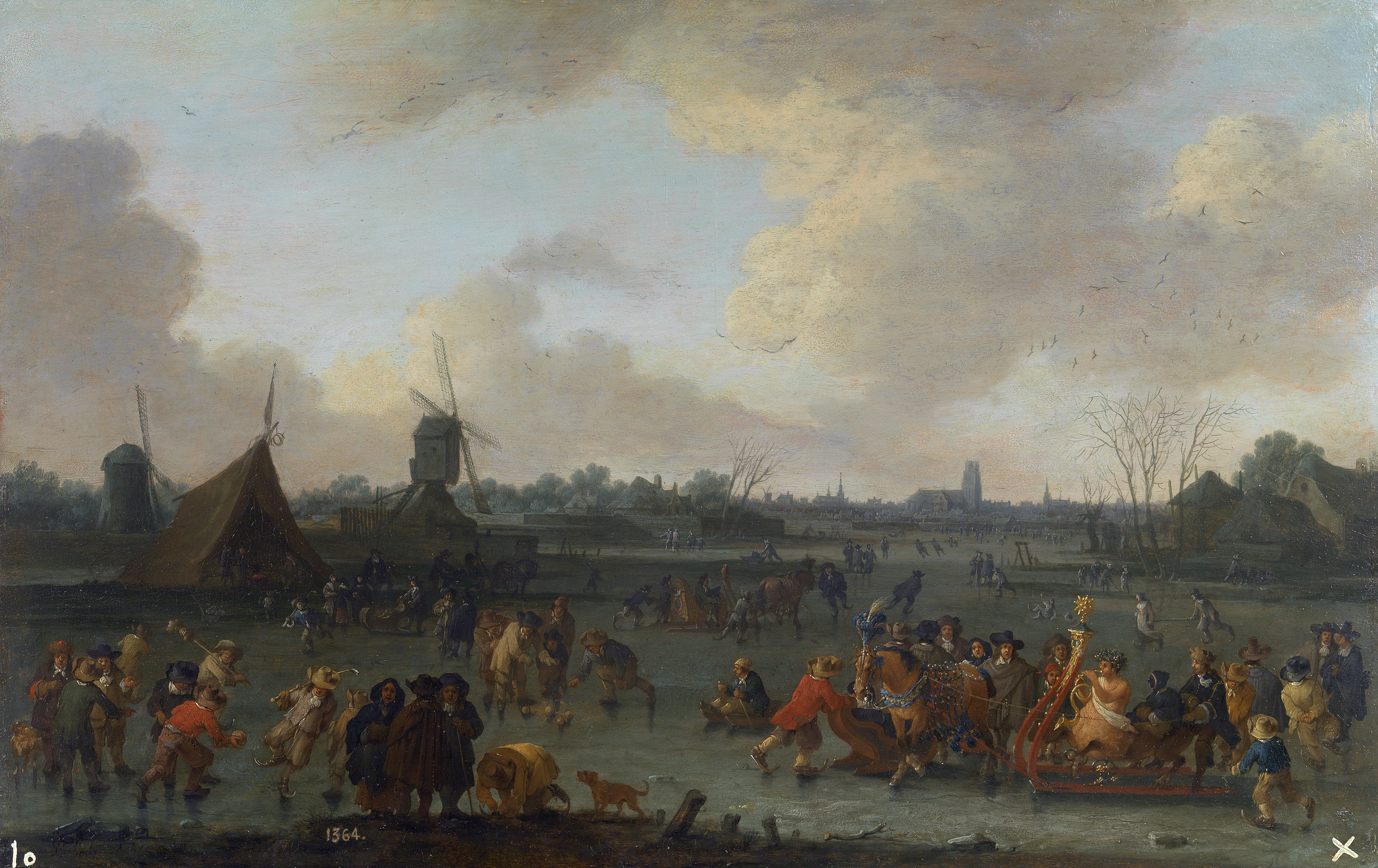
Ice Skaters

Some of his work is also similar to that of Pieter Casteels II, a Flemish painter known for his Italianizing landscapes and city views. His paintings often include lively scenes such as village festivals and people having fun on the ice. His paintings are lively and the brushwork is precise. His palette is clear and soft and announces the 18th century.

Pieter Bout collaborated regularly with other painters. He painted the staffage in the landscapes of Adriaen Frans Boudewijns, Lucas Achtschellinck, Jacques d'Arthois, Mathys Schoevaerdts, Hendrick de Meijer and Lucas Smout. Pieter Bout collaborated on a beach view with Lucas Smout who painted the landscape. This work, referred to as Harbour and Fish Market (Musée des beaux-arts de Quimper), possibly represents a view of the beach and port of Scheveningen as in its composition and figures it closely resembles Pieter Bout's Selling Fish at the Beach of Scheveningen (Van Ham Auctions, 11 May 2012, Lot 518).

The Rijksmuseum attributes to Bout a religious painting entitled The Adoration of the Shepherds.

Bout's drawings and etchings are similar to his paintings in style and subject matter.
