= Balthasar Beschey =

Flemish painter (1708–1776)

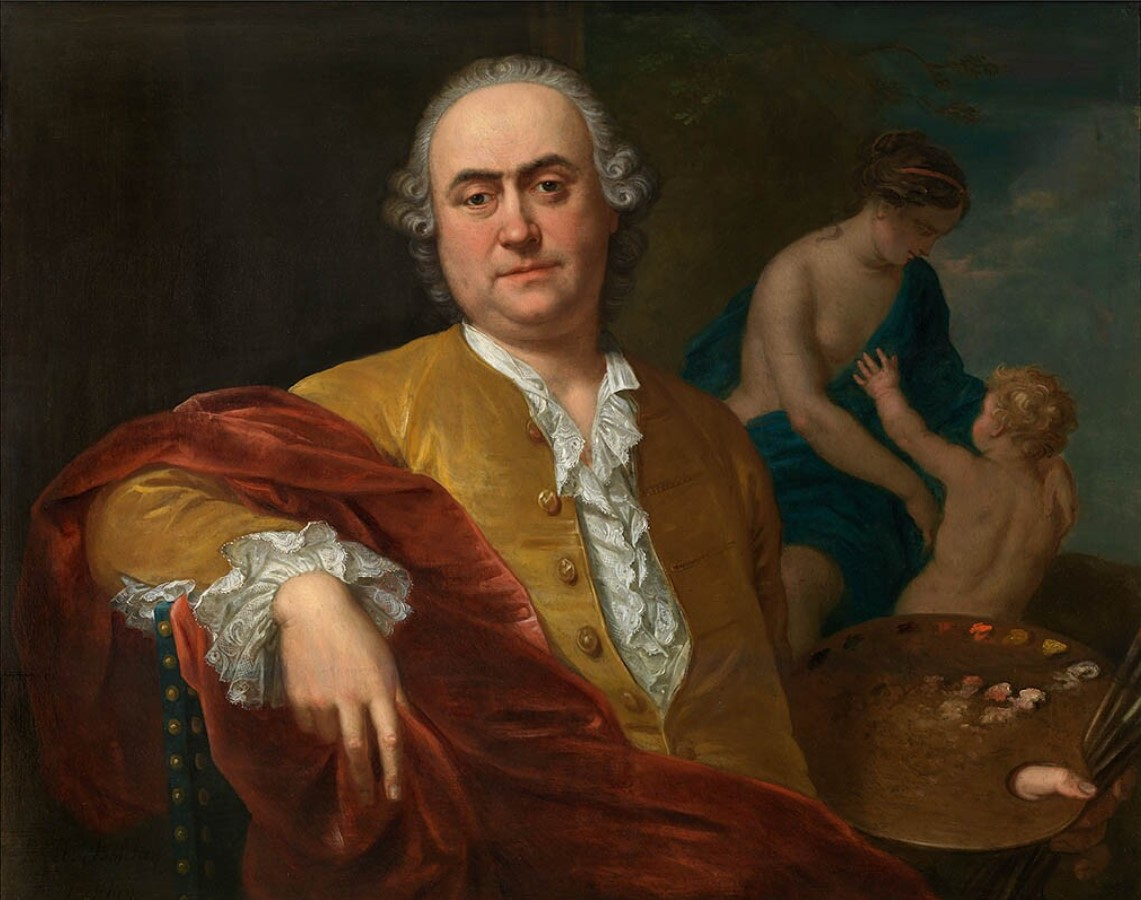
Self-portrait

Balthasar Beschey (1708, Antwerp – 1776, Antwerp) was a Flemish painter, draughtsman and decorative painter of interiors. He started his career as landscape painter but later on switched to history and portrait painting. He played a prominent role in the development of the Academy of Arts in Antwerp and as a teacher.

Beschey is sometimes recognized for his signature style of using a checkered floor.

== Life ==
Balthasar Beschey was born in Antwerp in 1708 as the son of Jacob Beschey and Maria-Theresia Huaert. Balthasar had four brothers, who all became painters. The best known was his elder brother Carel who was a landscape painter. His younger brothers were Jacob Andries who specialized in religious scenes, Jozef Hendrik who worked under the pseudonym Francis Lindo as a portrait painter in England and Jan Frans who established himself as a painter and art dealer in London.

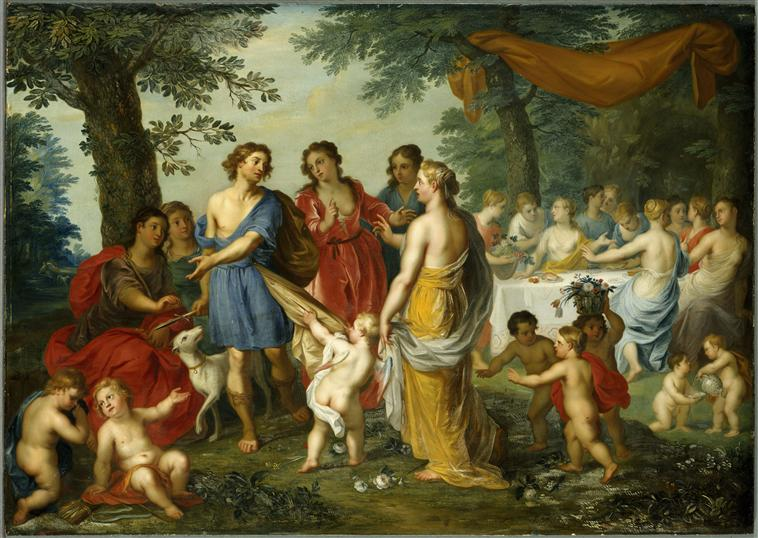
Venus and Adonis

Balthasar Beschey studied painting under the little known Pieter Strick. He became a master in the Antwerp Guild of Saint Luke on 25 November 1752. He married Johanna Catharina Rosa Pauwels on 14 January 1753. Balthasar Beschey became a professor and from 1755 a director of the Academy of Arts in Antwerp. He was the dean of the Guild of Saint Luke in 1775/76.

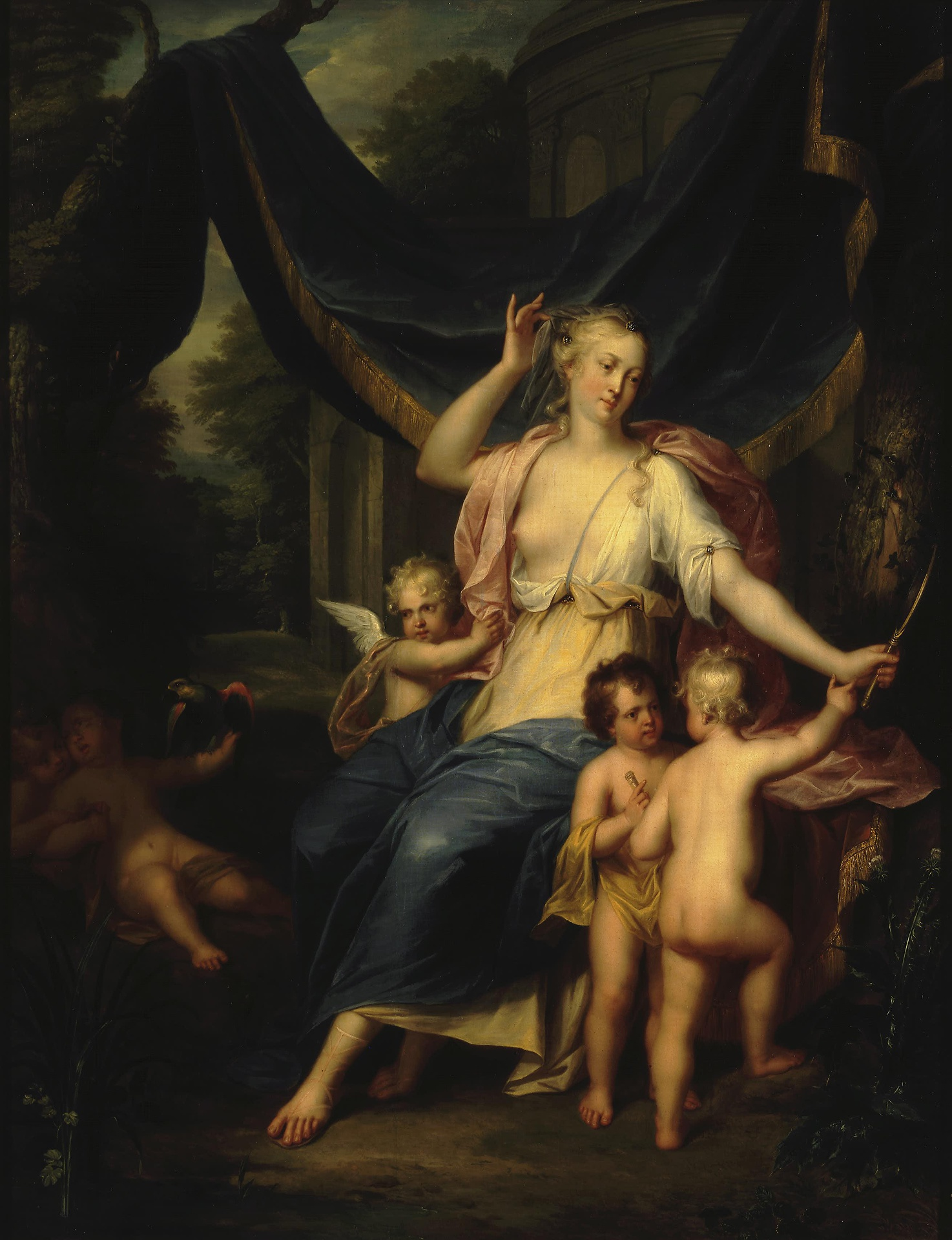
Allegory of Eyesight and the Sense of Touch

Balthasar Beschey operated in Antwerp an art restoration workshop and art dealership. Thanks to his connections in England through his brother Jan Frans, he was able to export Flemish paintings to England. There exists a record of a shipment of 9 paintings for a total value of 270 guilders, which he sent to his brother in London in 1751.

He was the teacher of Hendrik-Jozef Antonissen, Andries Cornels Lens and Pieter Jozef Verhaghen. It is possible that his nephew, also called Balthasar, who was the son of his brother Joseph Hendrik active in England, was his pupil. This Baltasar the Younger established himself later as a portrait painter in Amsterdam and his works have been misattributed to his uncle.

== Work ==
=== General ===
Balthasar Beschey painted in the first half of his career mainly landscapes but later he switched to history and portrait painting. He also produced a number of genre paintings. He often followed and even copied the work of Rubens and van Dyck in his history paintings and that of Jan Brueghel the Elder in his landscapes. A religious composition which is not derivative of Rubens is The liberation of St Peter from his chains painted for a clandestine church in Amsterdam.

=== Genre scenes ===
The Hermitage Museum has two genre paintings by Beschey which represent the five senses, a subject popular in Flemish art. Christie's sold another pair of genre scenes at its 30 March 2015 sale in Paris (lot 15) representing respectively a fishmarket and a Commedia dell'Arte scene.

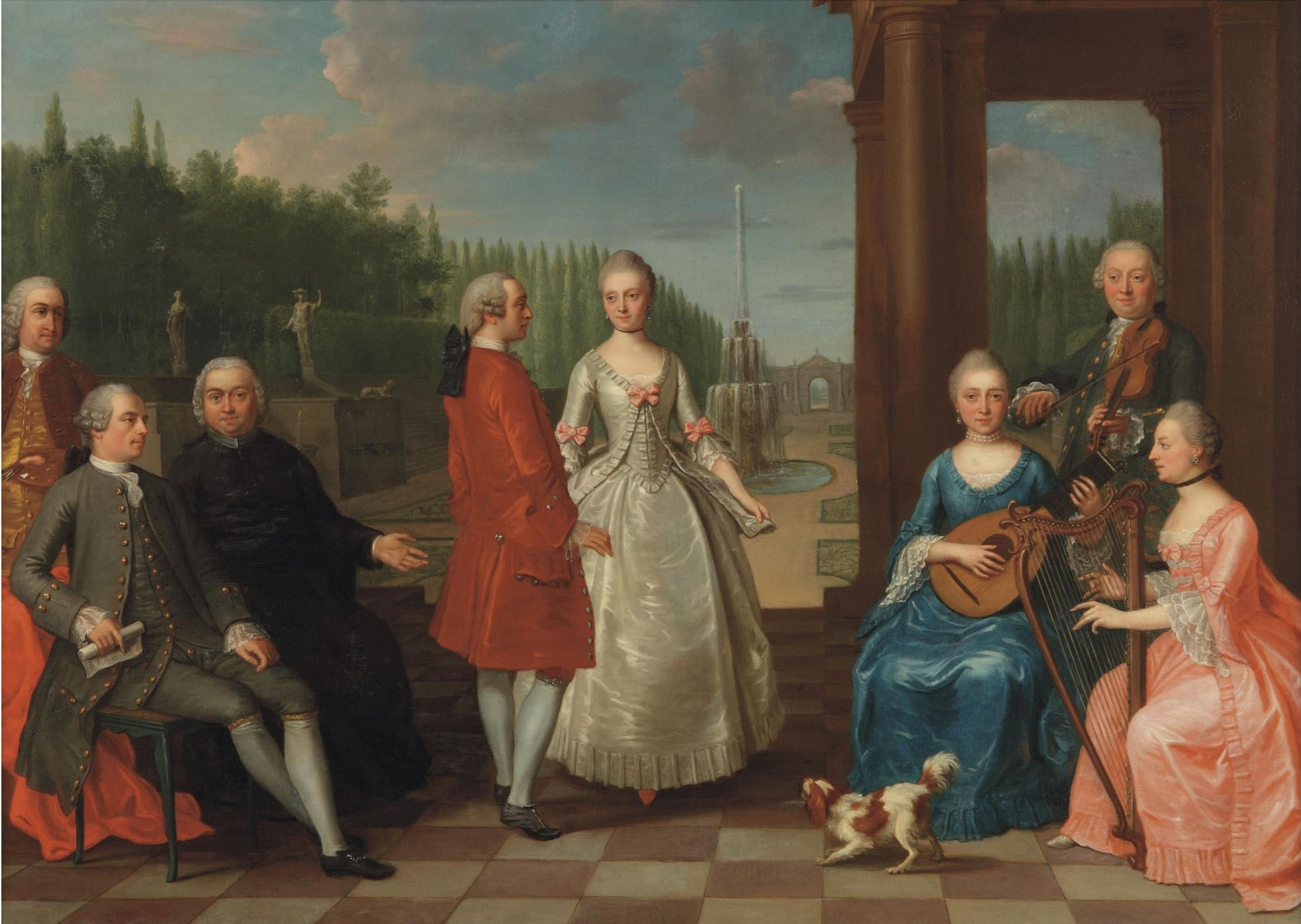
Portrait of Jacques-Jean Cremers and his wife, dancing, on a garden terrace

=== Portraits ===
Balthasar Beschey painted single as well as group portraits. In his Self-portrait (Royal Museum of Fine Arts Antwerp), which the artist donated in 1763 to the Academy of Antwerp, he painted himself in a flamboyant manner with his right arm loosely hanging over the back of a chair and a large palette in his left hand. He is working on a figure composition but it is not clear exactly which subject he is painting. It could be a Venus with Cupid or alternatively, an allegory, possibly of the fine arts. The work is very similar in style to French portraiture of that time. Beschey also follows the French fashion with his yellow silk jacket with frill and powdered wig.

He painted a pair of family portraits of two generations of the Cremers family, one representing the family in an outdoor setting playing music and the second representing the wedding of the parents Cremer who are all seated and making music. In the first painting, Jacob Johannes Cremers is seated on the left side between the artist who portrayed himself standing with a palette in his hand and an ecclesiast.

== Selected works ==
Royal Museum of Fine Arts Antwerp:

- The Death of Cleopatra (originally listed as work by Rubens)
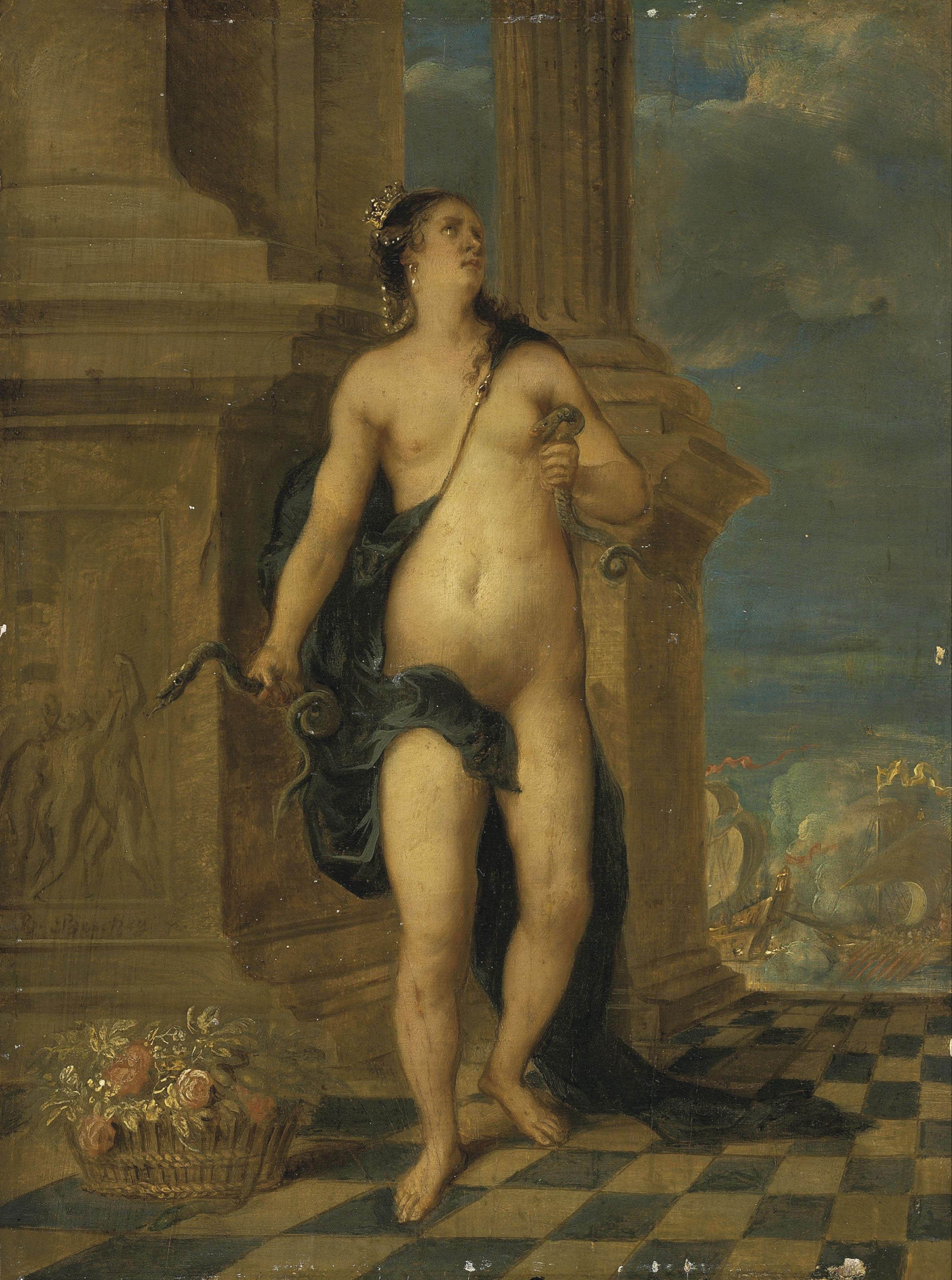
  The Death of Cleopatra
- Joseph sold by his brothers (signed and dated 1744).
- The brothers try to buy corn from Joseph, the Vice-Roy of Egypt (signed and dated 1744).
- A Hermit at Prayer (National Museum in Warsaw)

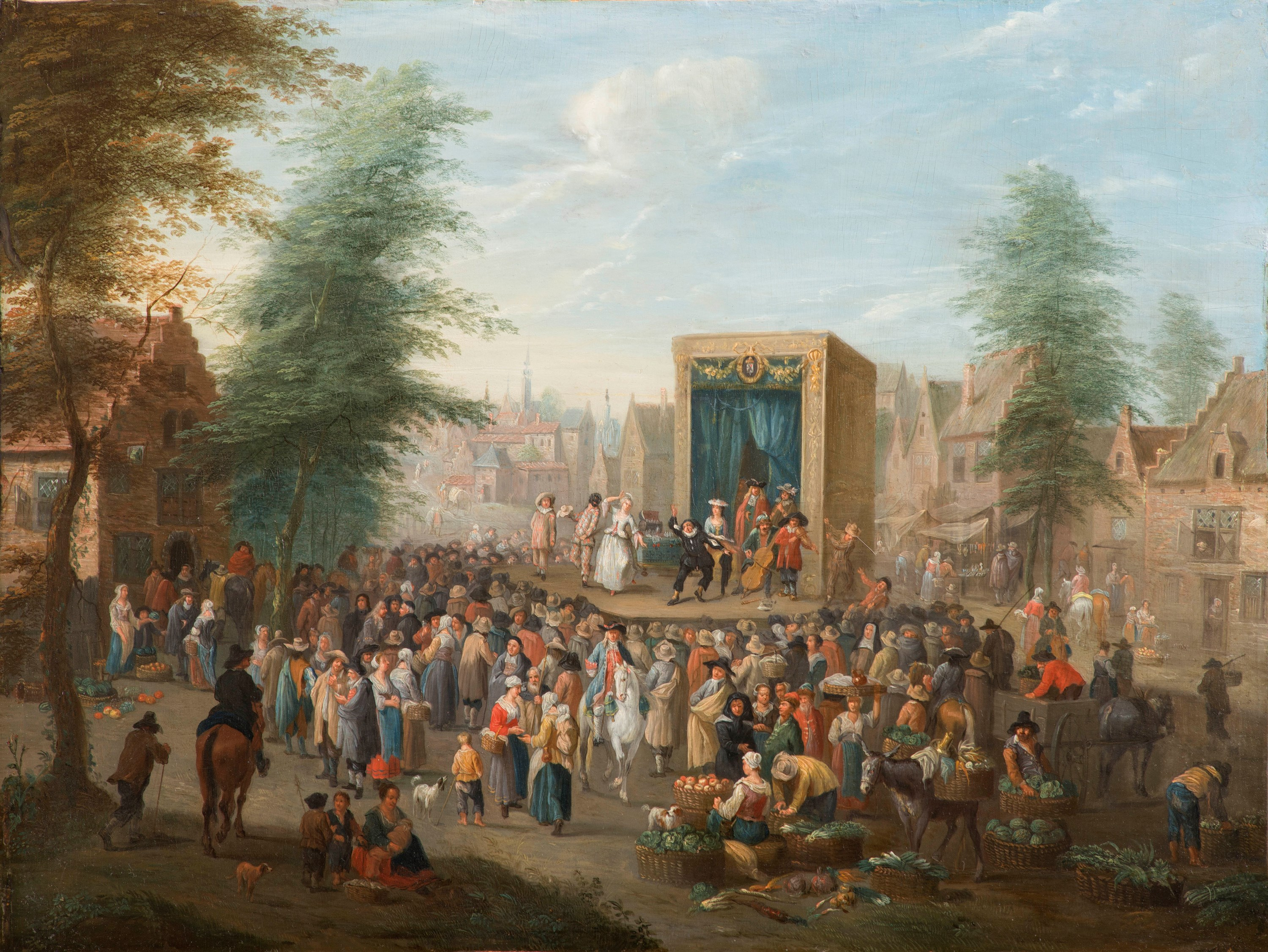
La Commedia dell'Arte

- Self-portrait (signed — donated by the artist to the Academy of Antwerp in 1763).
- Portrait of the painter Martin Joseph Geeraerts.

Louvre, Paris:

- Portrait of a Family (signed and dated 1731).

Hermitage, Petersburg:

- The Five Senses. Allegory of Eyesight and the Sense of Touch. Signed and dated: B. BESCHEIJ, 1733.
- The Five Senses. Allegory of Hearing, Taste and Smell Signed and dated: B. BESCHEIJ.

Azerbaijan National Museum, Baku, Azerbaijan

- Venus and Adonis
