= Peeter Gijsels =

Flemish painter

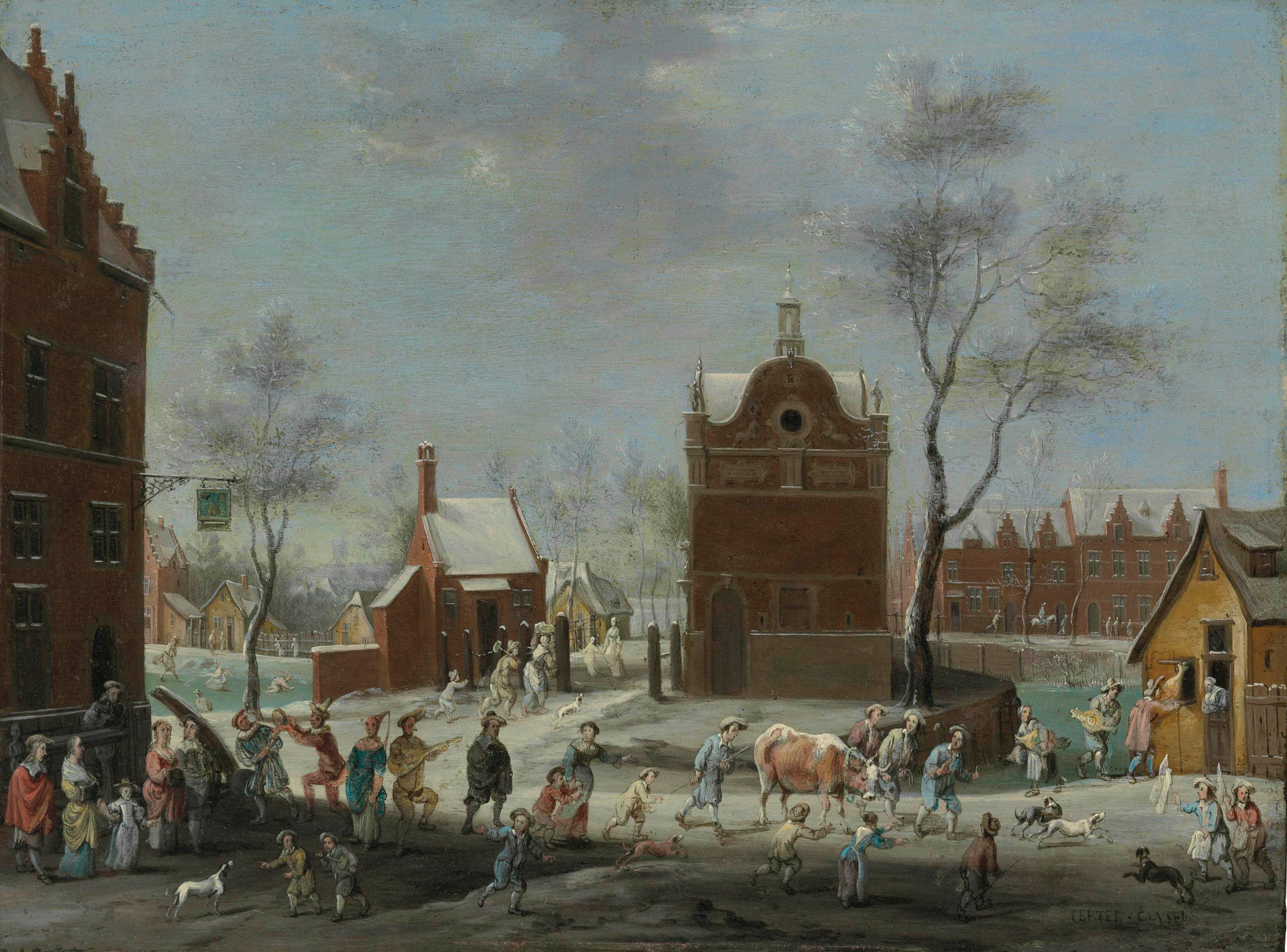
Winter carnival in a small Flemish town

Peeter Gijsels or Pieter Gijsels (1621, Antwerp – 1690, Antwerp), was a Flemish Baroque painter. He is known for his landscapes, architectural compositions and still lifes. His landscapes in the style of Jan Brueghel the Elder were very sought after in his time. He also painted genre scenes of village markets and kermises and landscapes with elegant companies.

== Life ==
Details about the background and training of the artist are scarce. Peeter Gijsels was baptized on 3 December 1621 in the St James Church in Antwerp. He was the son of Peter Gijsels and Lucia Adriaens. His family was very poor and his father died when he was only 4 years old. Gijsels was registered in the records of the Antwerp Guild of St. Luke as a pupil of the obscure painter Jan or Johannes Boots or Boets in the guild year 1641–1642. He became a master of the Antwerp Guild in the guild year 1649–1650.

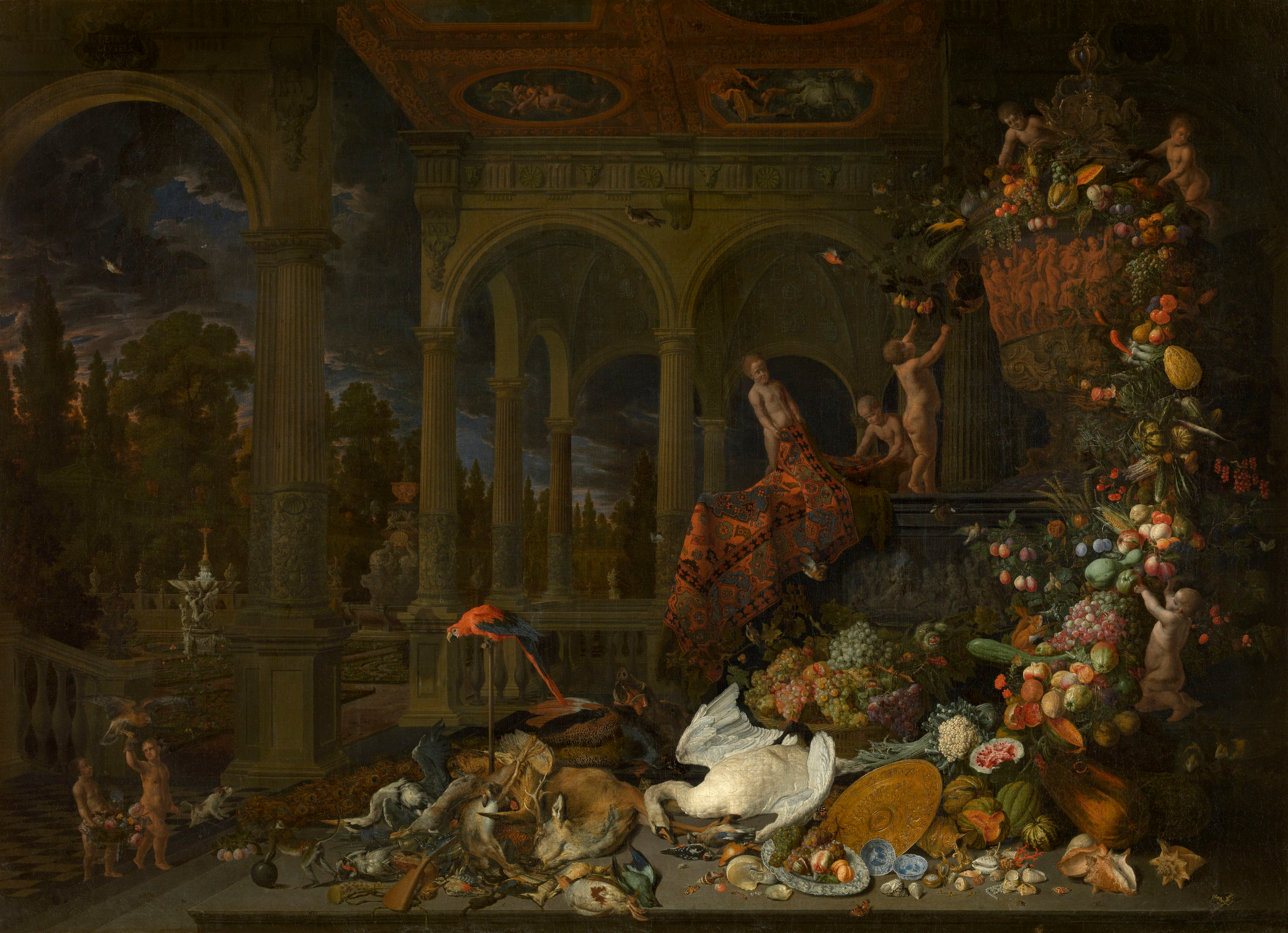
Still life of game in a landscape with classical architecture

He married Joanna Huybrecht on 13 November 1650. The couple had five children: Jacob and Peter (born on 24 November 1651), Hendrik (born on 20 February 1655) and Lucia and Maria Anna (born on 22 April 1658). Their son Peter may have been the artist named Gysels who executed still-life paintings in the style of Flemish painters Frans Snyders and Jan Fyt.

The artist worked in Antwerp during his entire career. His works were sold on the private market to the local aristocracy. He died in his hometown at the end of the year 1690.

== Work ==
Peeter Gijsels is known for his landscapes, architectural scenes and still life paintings. He also was a genre artist who painted many scenes of Flemish village kermisses, dances and markets. His compositions are typically small-scale and painted on copper.

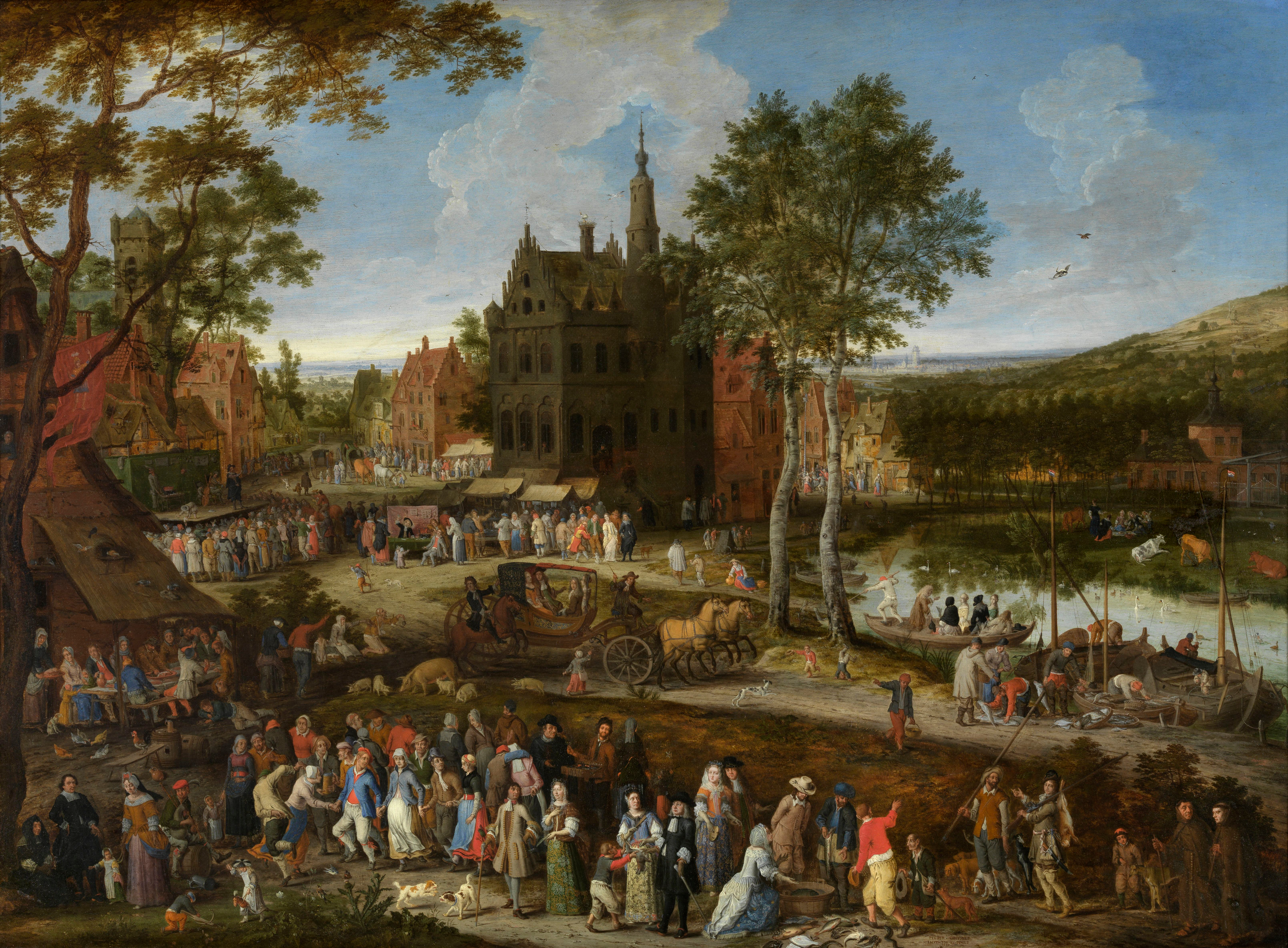
Kermis in a Flemish village

His landscape paintings are brightly colored and often populated with many figures in the style of Jan Brueghel the Elder. Because of this similarity with Jan Brueghel the Elder's landscapes, the Dutch biographer Arnold Houbraken erroneously stated that Gijsels studied with Brueghel. Even though there is no documentary evidence to support this, the close stylistic similarity with Brueghel's work has given rise to the assumption that the artist may have worked or trained with Brueghel's son, Jan Brueghel the Younger, who worked in the style of his father. In addition to village scenes Gijsels also painted landscape compositions with elegant figures such as the Elegant company making music with a lady and a gentleman dancing around a maypole (Christie's London sale of 7 December 2006 lot 34). Gijsels painted many river and coastal landscapes.

His still lifes include flower still lifes, game and hunting pieces in landscapes and kitchen scenes with fruit, vegetables and kitchen utensils.
