= De Jode =

de Jode is a Dutch surname. Notable people with the surname include:

- Arnold de Jode (fl. 1638–1667), Dutch engraver
- Cornelis de Jode (1568–1600), Dutch cartographer, engraver and publisher
- Gerard de Jode (1511–1591), Dutch cartographer, engraver, and publisher
- Hans de Jode (fl. 1630–1662), Dutch painter
- Pieter de Jode I (1570–1634), Flemish printmaker, draughtsman, publisher and painter
- Pieter de Jode II (1606–1674), Flemish Baroque printmaker, draughtsman, painter and art dealer
