= Martinus van den Enden the Elder =

Flemish printmaker and publisher

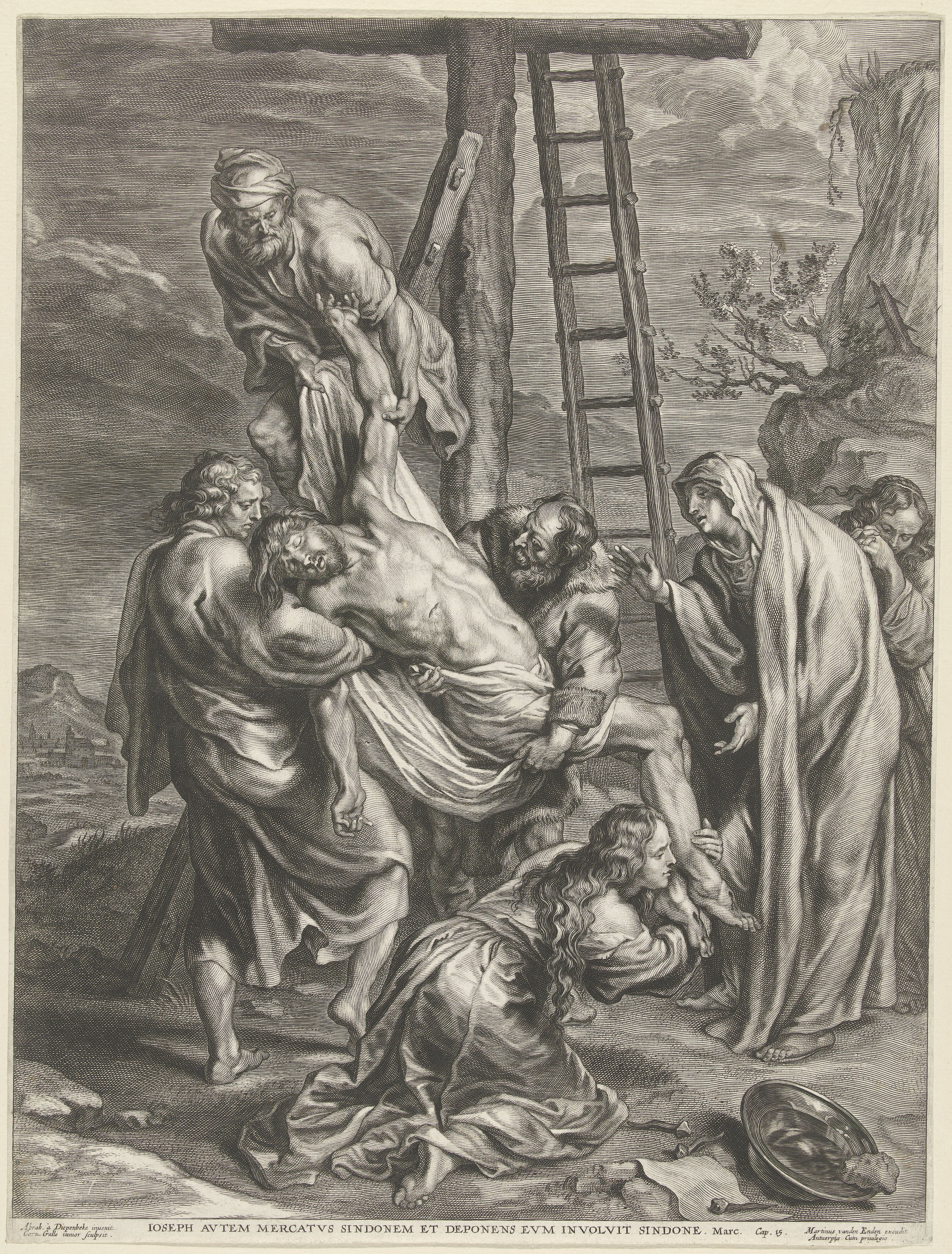
Descent from the Cross, engraved by Cornelis Galle (II), after design by Abraham van Diepenbeeck, published by van den Enden

Martinus or Maarten van den Enden or van den Eynde (30 October 1605, in Antwerp – after 20 June 1654) was a Flemish printer, publisher, bookseller and art dealer who was active in Antwerp in the early 17th century. He was a leading publisher of art works and was the first publisher of Anthony van Dyck's Icones Principum Virorum (referred to as the Iconographie), a series of prints with half-length portraits of eminent contemporaries. By the middle of the 17th century, he was a leading publisher of prints in Antwerp, along with Frans van den Wyngaerde, Gillis Hendricx and Joannes Meyssens.

== Life ==
He was born in Antwerp as the son of Johannes (Hans) van den Enden and Barbara Janssens. He was baptized on 30 October 1605. His parents were manual labourers who worked as weavers. He was the younger brother of Johannes the Younger and Franciscus van den Enden, who became a Neo-Latin poet, physician, art dealer and philosopher. It is not known whether Martinus also studied like his older brothers at the Augustine or Jesuit colleges in Antwerp. Given his later career, it does not seem unlikely that early in life he became the apprentice of an artist or craftsman. He must have enjoyed at least a basic education as confirmed by his signature under several documents. At least one painting with his signature has been identified. It is a depiction of the Visitation of Mary, which until the middle of the twentieth century was thought to be an early work of Peter Paul Rubens. It may have been a copy he made to sell in his art business. He was registered as a master art dealer in the Guild of St. Luke of Antwerp in the Guild year 1630–1631.

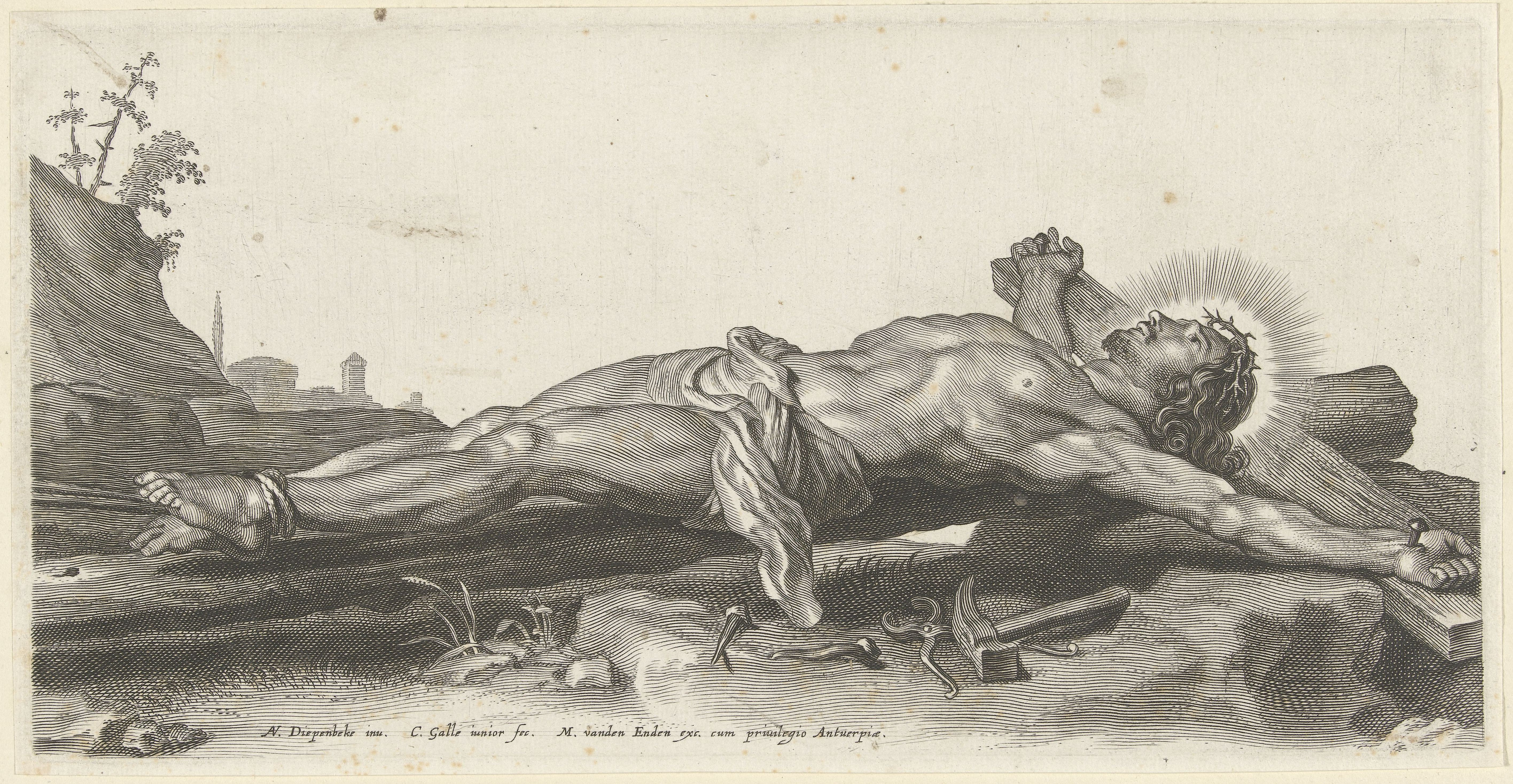
Crucified Christ on the ground, engraved by Cornelis Galle the Younger after design by Abraham van Diepenbeeck

He married in 1626 Lucretia de la Haij, who was possibly a relative of the Antwerp engraver and printer Michiel Haeye (Haeij). The couple lived in a house called the 'Witte Leeuw' (White Lion) in the Haarstraat, near the Grote Markt in the centre of Antwerp. They were the parents of Martinus the younger, who was baptized on 25 April 1633 in the Cathedral of Antwerp, with the publisher Gillis Hendricx acting as godfather. Martinus the younger continued the business and also became an art dealer. Martinus the Elder's presumed daughter Clara van den Enden married the prominent engraver Pieter de Jode II in 1648. This shows that he was well connected in the art and publishing world in Antwerp. He may have operated a side business as a seller of paintings, art assessor and wine merchant, but his major occupation was that of a print publisher.

While van den Enden seems to have been successful in building good relationships with other publishers, engravers and artists and to sell some of his output abroad, he seems to have run into financial trouble. This lead in March 1644 to a financial settlement with Gillis Hendricx, the godfather of his son. It is possible that Gillis Hendricx obtained the plates for the Iconographie under this settlement and thus could become the second publisher of the Iconographie. In November 1651, in another settlement van den Enden was required to pay the painter Jan Baptist Borrekens a debt of 250 guilders to Borrekens, to be discharged by printing as many copies as were needed from plates that were owned jointly by him and Pieter de Jode. On 20 June 1654, he was recorded as a ‘buitenpoorter’ in the poorter books of Antwerp, meaning that from that date on he lived outside the city walls while retaining his Antwerp citizenship.

It is not known where and when he died, and no further documents are available that can shed light on what happened to him from about the second half of the 1650s. It is believed that his son continued his business in Antwerp after his father left the city.

== Publications ==
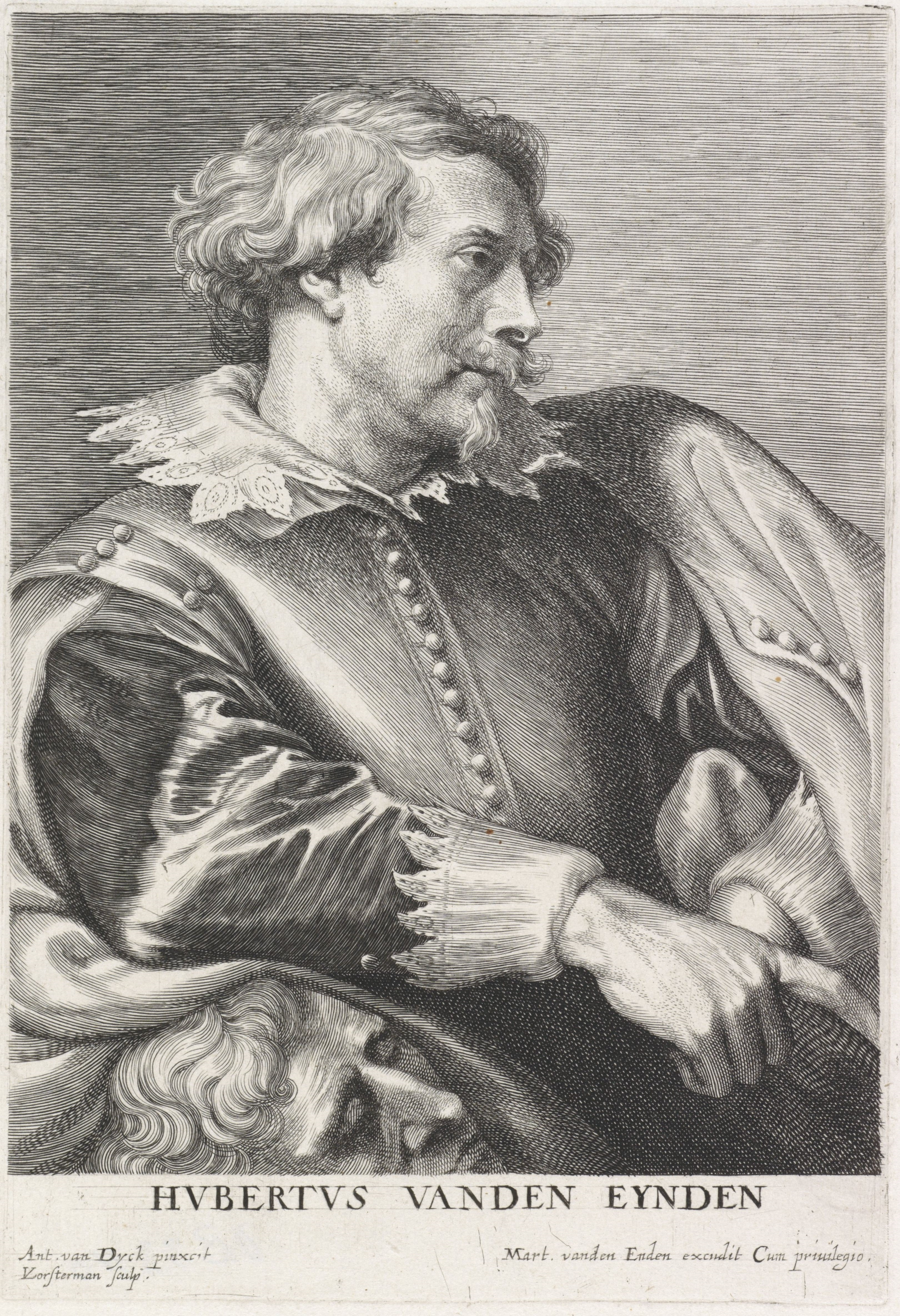
Portrait of Huibrecht van den Eynde, engraved by Lucas Vorsterman the Elder for the Iconographie

Martinus van den Enden specialized in large to medium-sized prints executed by leading local engravers, after designs by leading Antwerp masters executed in a style and with themes that were typical of the Counter Reformation. He published more than 250 prints. Aside from portraits, the largest group of prints published by van den Enden depict Biblical scenes, followed by hagiographic prints, landscapes, genre scenes and mythological subjects.

He worked most often with the engravers Schelte à Bolswert (c.1586–1659), Paulus Pontius (1603–1658), Lucas Vorsterman the Elder (c.1595–1675), Michel Natalis (1610–1668), Pieter de Jode II (1601–1674), Mattheus Borrekens (1615–1670) and Pieter de Bailliu (1613-after 1665). His major publication project was that of 84 portrait prints for Anthony van Dyck's Iconographie. Van den Enden was involved in this project initiated by van Dyck from the start. All the prints in the series have the same approximate dimensions and are all executed in a similar style showing that they were meant to form a collection. However, it was only the second publisher, Gillis Hendricx, who first sold them with an accompanying title page. While the Iconographie clearly incorporated predominantly portraits of local artists, it had a wide appeal outside the Antwerp print market and van den Enden was able to market the prints easily abroad.

Other artists with whom van den Enden regularly collaborated on prints were Peter Paul Rubens and Abraham van Diepenbeeck, and, to a lesser degree, Cornelis de Wael (1592–1667) and Jan Lievens (1607–1674).
