= Alexander Voet the Elder =

Flemish engraver

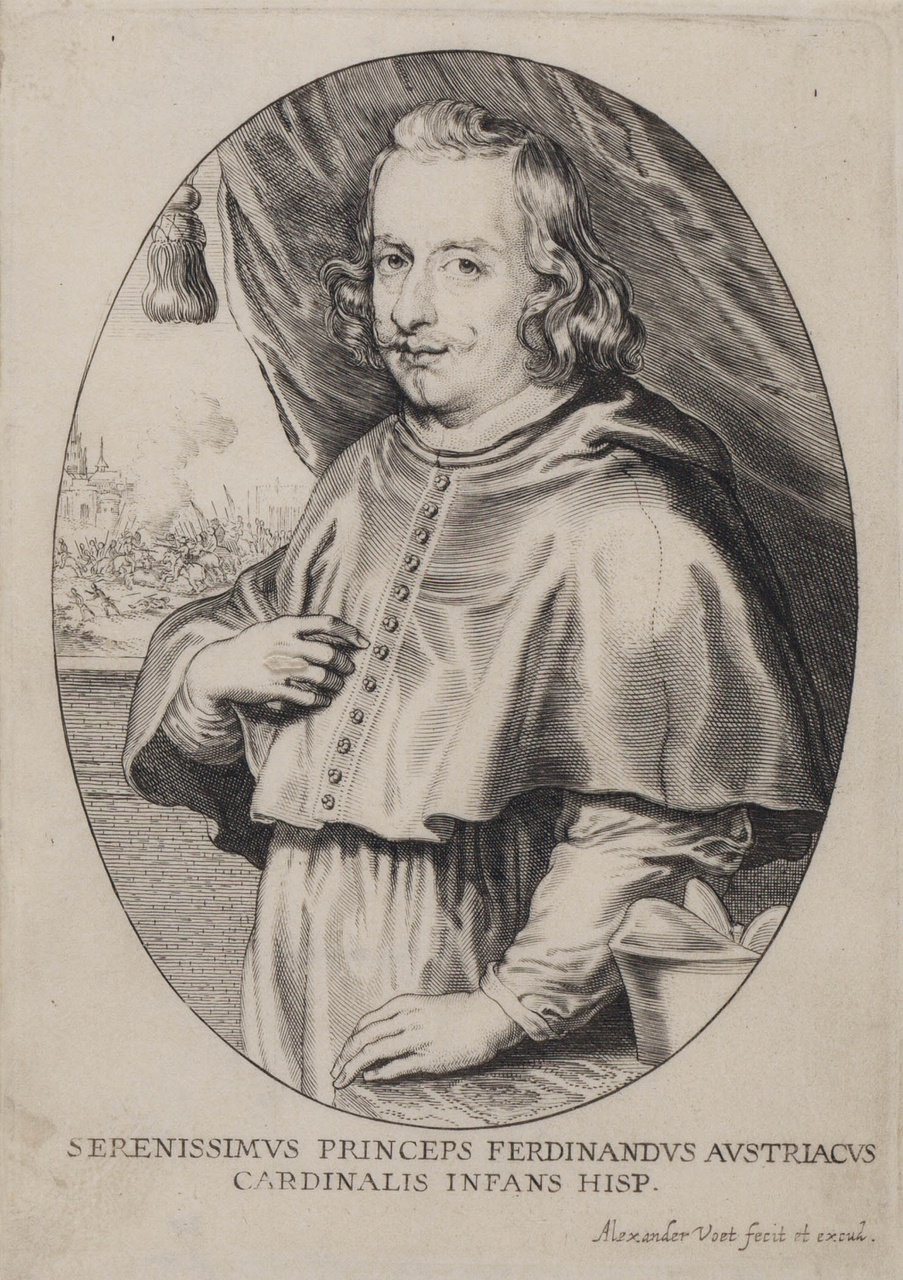
Cardinal-Infante Ferdinand of Austria after Rubens

Alexander Voet the Elder or Alexander Voet I (10 September 1608 (or possibly in 1613) in Antwerp – 1 October 1689 in Antwerp) was a Flemish engraver, print artist and publisher. He was one of the leading engravers and publishers in Antwerp in the middle and second half of the 17th century. He operated a large workshop in which sixty to seventy collaborators took care of the entire process of printmaking, printing and publishing.

== Life ==
Details about Alexander Voet's early life are scarce. He was born in Antwerp in 1608 or possibly 1613. Nothing is known about Alexander Voet's training. Because stylistically his prints are very close to the engraving style of the prominent engraver Paulus Pontius some historians have speculated he may have been his pupil. Voet became a member of the Antwerp Guild of Saint Luke in 1628.

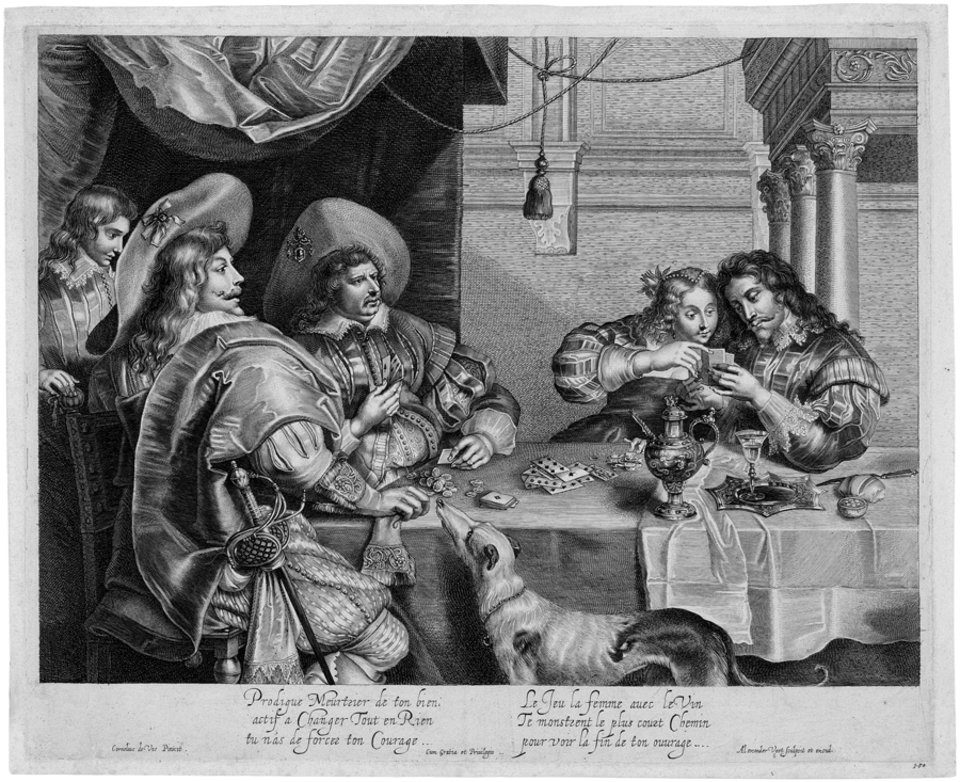
The Card Players after Cornelis de Vos

He married Catharina Huybrechts on 28 November 1630. After the death of his first wife, he remarried Sara van der Steen on 9 December 1634. His second wife was the mother of Alexander who also became an engraver. His daughter Sara married Gaspar Huybrechts, another prominent Antwerp engraver and publisher. Alexander was active from 1634 in the local chamber of rhetoric "De Violieren".

Voet was very successful as engraver and publisher. Around 1665 he employed between 60 and 70 workers who were illuminators, plate cutters, printers etc. This large workshop allowed Voet to carry out the entire printing and publishing activity in his workshop.

At his death in 1689 he left a large collection of artworks including paintings and drawings by leading Antwerp artists of his age such as Rubens, van Dyck and Adriaen Brouwer as well as by artists from the 16th century.

His pupils included his son Alexander, Alexander Goetiers (Gaquier), Adriaen Lommelin, Edouard van Ordonie, Franciscus van der Steen, Renier Manteler, Alexander, Gillis de Mesmaker and Pieter Maepeye.

== Work ==
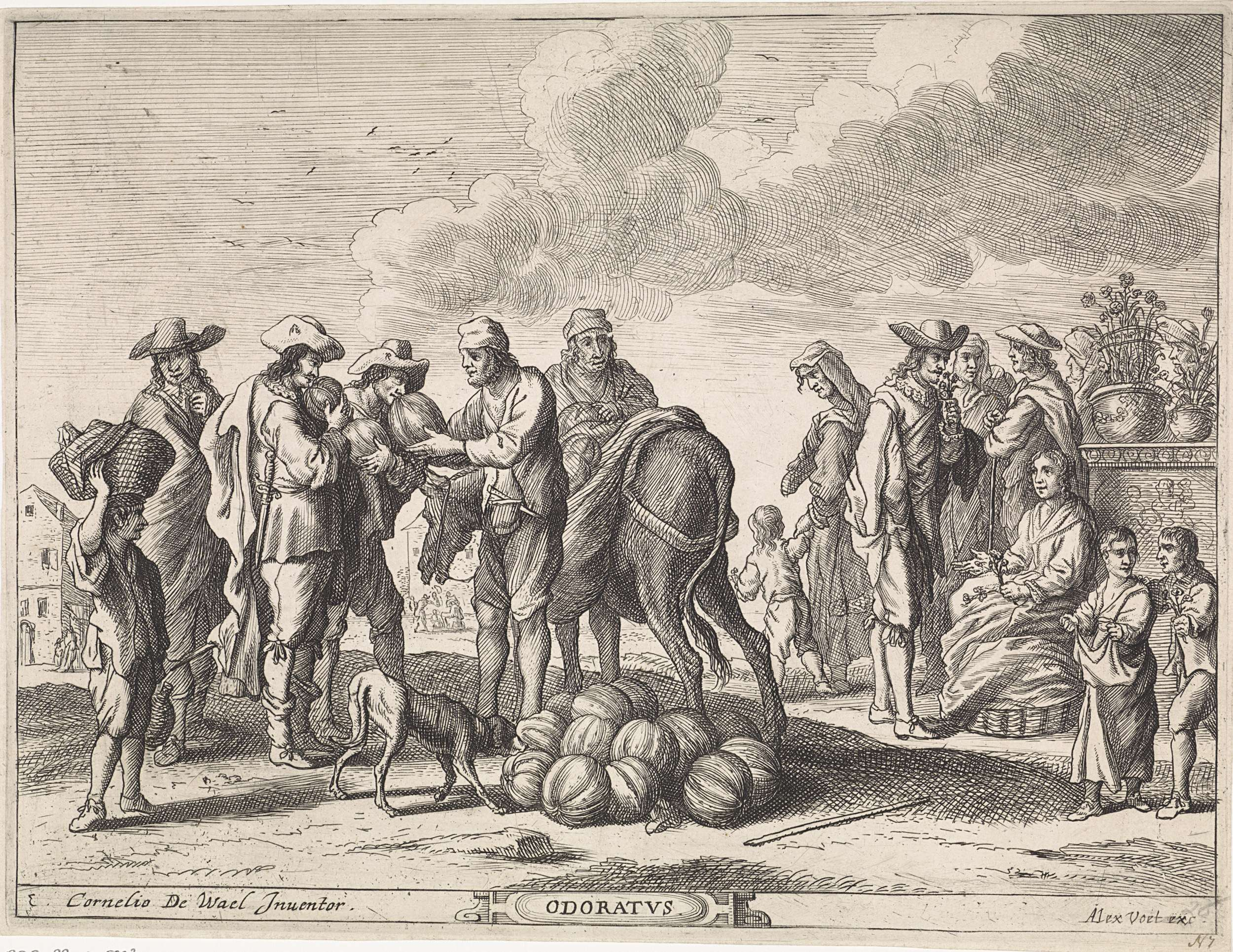
Odoratus (Smell), after Cornelis de Wael

Alexander Voet operated a large workshop. Many works that name him as the author were produced by assistants in his workshop rather than Voet himself. There is also some confusion as to whether certain works are to be attributed to Alexander Voet the Elder or his son Alexander the Younger.

Alexander Voet was active as a reproductive artist who made prints after the works of contemporary Antwerp masters such as Rubens, van Dyck, Erasmus Quellinus the Younger, Cornelis de Vos and others. An example is the Card Players, an engraving after Cornelis de Vos' original which is now in the Nationalmuseum in Stockholm. Stylistically this print is very close to the engraving style of Paulus Pontius in its sharpness. He further published and may also have engraved some plates of two series of prints after designs by Cornelis de Wael, one on the five senses and one on the four seasons. Melchior Hamers and Willem Peeters were the principal engravers for these sets.

In addition, he worked on many of the devotional publications of the Catholic monastic orders, in particular the Jesuits, Franciscans and Dominicans. He also produced plates for the frontispieces and illustration of various other publications. An example is the frontispiece that he cut after a design by Rubens for the 1633 publication 'Theoremata de centro grauitatis partium circuli et ellipsis' by the Flemish Jesuit and mathematician Jean-Charles della Faille.
