= Anselm van Hulle =

Flemish painter

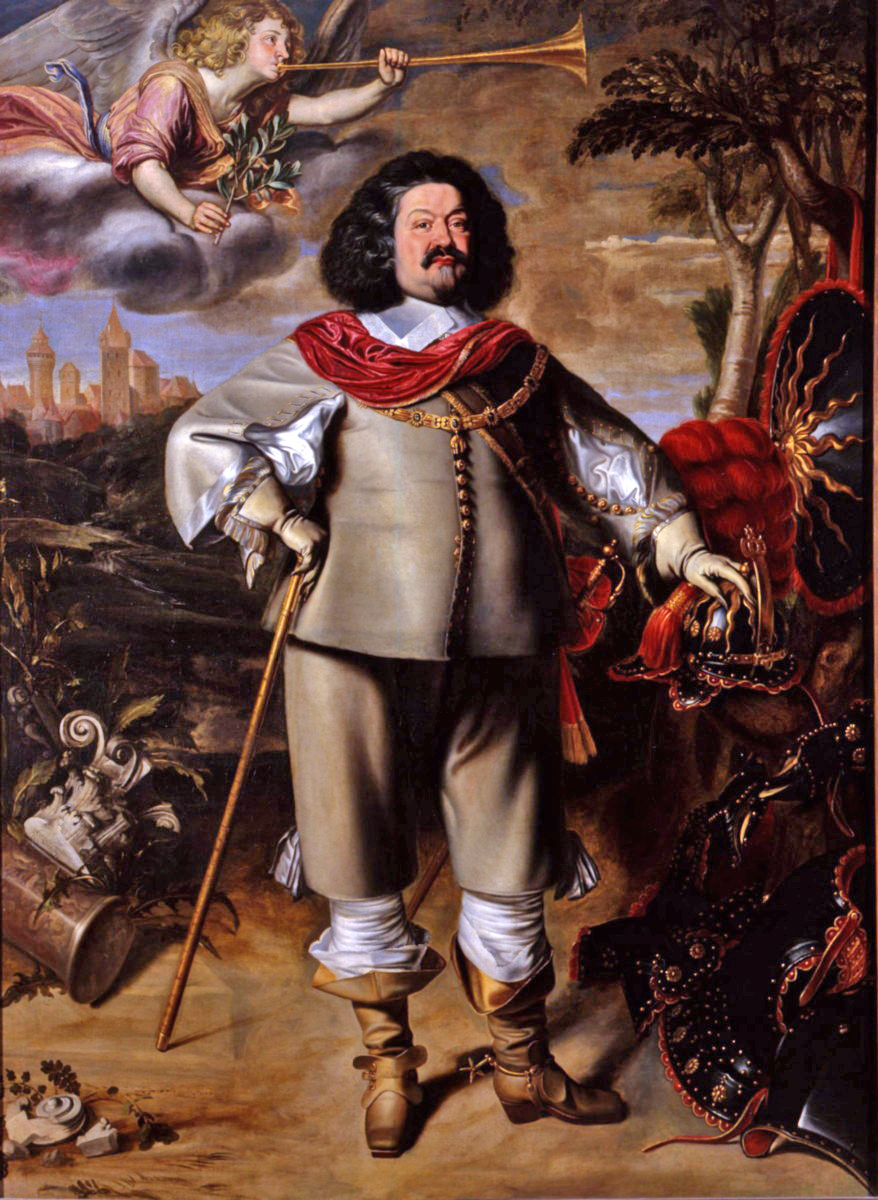
Portrait of Count Ottavio Piccolomini

Anselm van Hulle or Anselmus van Hulle (Gent, 1601 – 1674/1694) was a Flemish painter mainly of portraits whose works were highly prized at the Northern European Courts. He was court painter to the Prince of Orange and was one of the few portrait painters who attended the peace negotiations for the Peace of Münster in 1648. Van Hulle established an international reputation by having the portraits he made of the delegates at the negotiations engraved and published.

== Life ==
Anselm van Hulle was baptized in the St. Bavo Church in Gent on 23 July 1601. He was the son of Egidius van Hulle. He may have been a pupil of Gaspar de Crayer, a leading Baroque painter from Antwerp working mainly in Brussels. A training with such a prominent painter was relatively expensive. Van Hulle came from a wealthy family owning various lands and annuities, which he had partially inherited, and was thus able to afford the cost of such a training should it in effect have taken place.

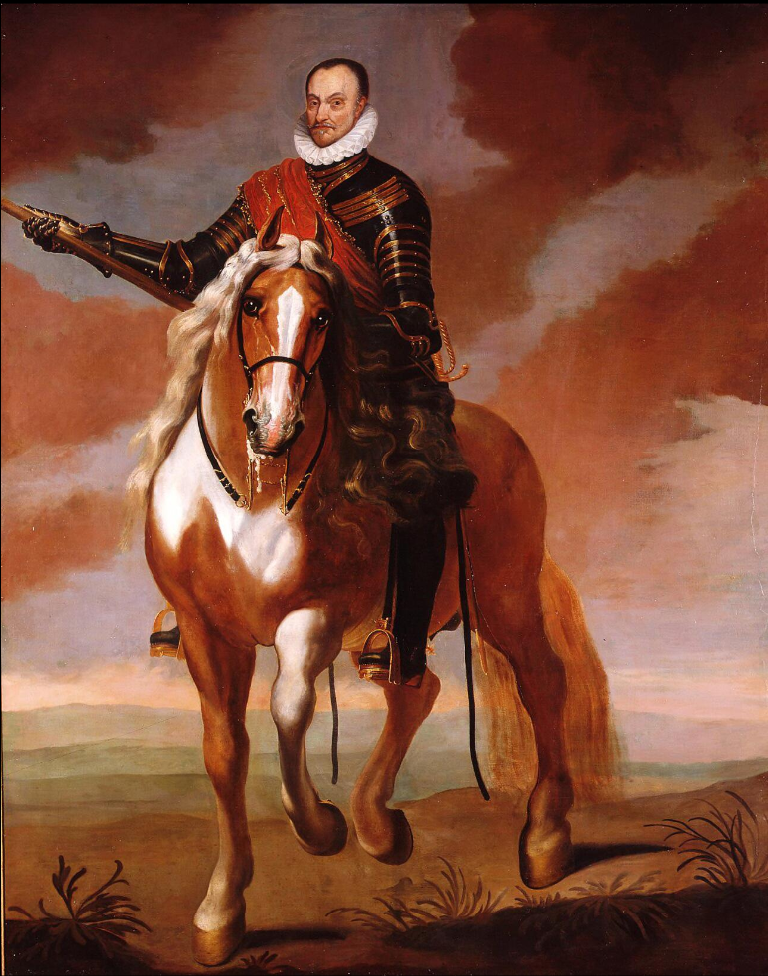
Equestrian portrait of William the Silent

Van Hulle became a master in the Guild of St. Luke of Gent in 1620. He probably made a trip to Italy in 1631 but was back in Gent in the same year. He married on 14 December 1631 with Livina of Thuyne. The couple had four children, who were all baptized in the St. Bavo Church. It is not clear when he moved to the Dutch Republic. He became court painter to the Dutch stadtholder Frederick Henry, Prince of Orange. Van Hulle made various portraits of persons of the Orange dynasty. The Prince sent him in 1645 or 1646 to Münster to make portraits of the delegates who attended the peace negotiations for the Peace of Münster. Van Hulle established a large workshop in Münster to make the portraits and copies of the same. The Flemish painter Jan-Baptist Floris was likely initially an employee of van Hulle’s workshop and later started working for his own account by making portraits mostly based on van Hulle's work. Floris is recorded as having received a commission for 34 portrait paintings of the delegates for the Münster Town Council at a price of ten thalers. Van Hulle typically charged 10 ducats (20 thalers) for a bust painted by himself.

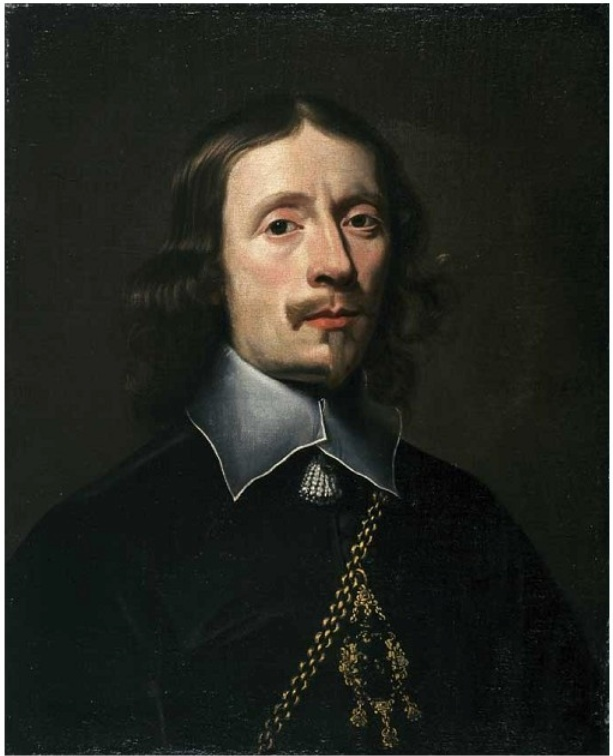
Portrait of Doctor August Carpzow

Van Hulle’s workshop produced many copies of the delegates' portraits which were often acquired by the delegates themselves and by the local councils of cities in the region where the peace talks were held such as Münster and Osnabrück. Van Hulle was active as an art dealer during his residence in Münster. He left Münster for a while in 1647 to attend to an inheritance matter in the family of his wife.

After the conclusion of the peace negotiations in Münster, van Hulle followed the delegates to Nuremberg where the debriefings took place in 1649. His patron Frederick Henry died the same year. He travelled to Kassel in 1650 and was active at the Dresden court in 1651. He probably also worked at other courts in the region. From 1652 he was active in Vienna where he entered the service of Emperor Ferdinand III. The emperor gave him a peerage on 27 August 1652. The Emperor sent him to Gottorf Castle in 1653 to paint a portrait of Frederick III, Duke of Holstein-Gottorp. He then returned to Vienna.

The last known record about van Hulle relates to his administration of the estate of Livina van den Tuyne (died 19 March 1673) for which he appeared before a notary in Gent, together with his son Pieter.

== Work ==
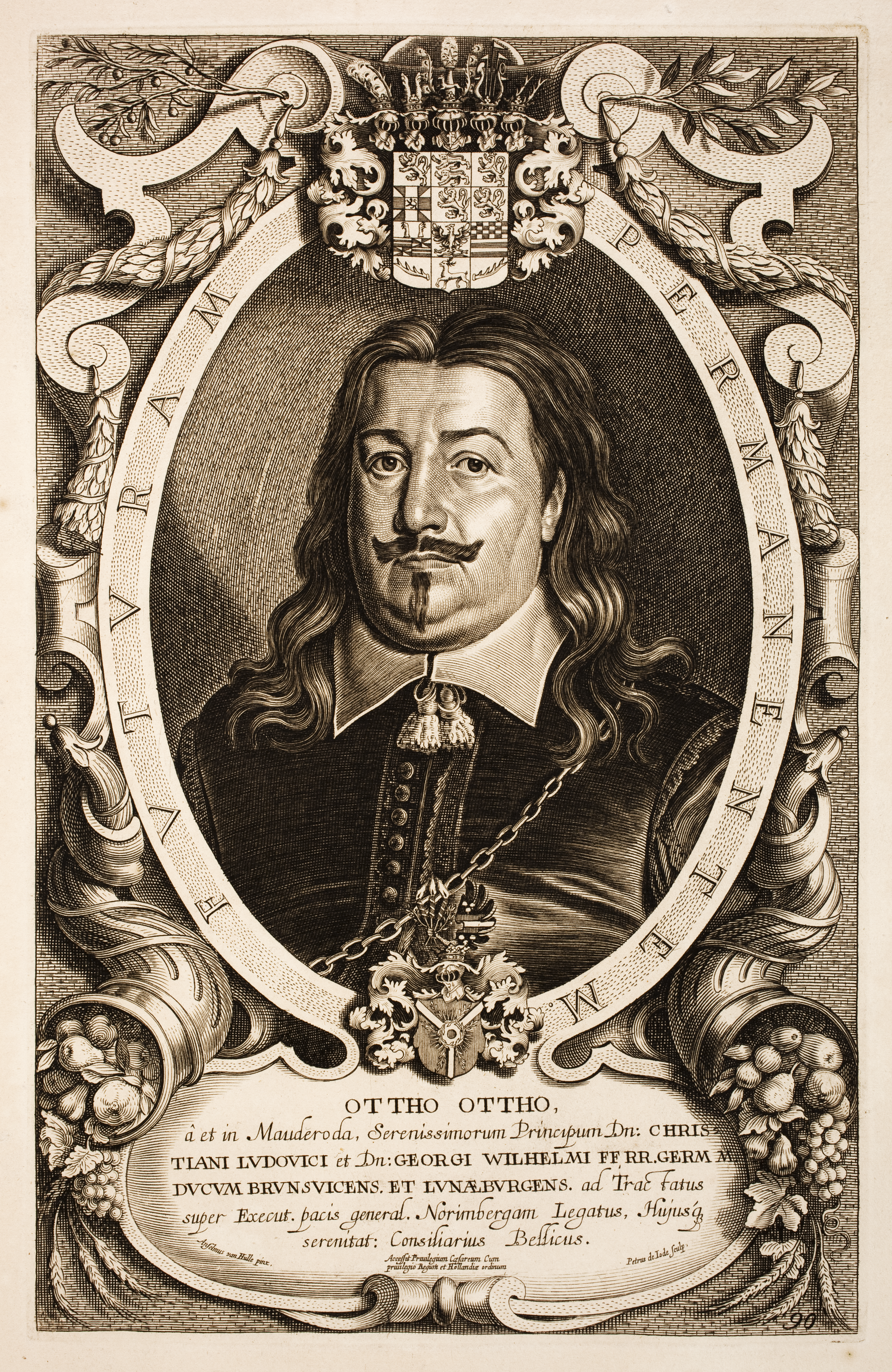
Portrait of Ottho Ottho from the 1717 edition of 'Les Hommes Illustres'

Van Hulle has been described as a painter of portraits and history paintings. However, only portrait paintings are currently attributed to him. His portrait paintings include single portraits, family portraits, bust portraits and equestrian portraits. He was a portrait painter to the elite.

As court painter to the Dutch stadtholder Frederick Henry, Prince of Orange he produced, amongst others, a series of equestrian portraits of the Dutch stadtholders starting from William the Silent the Frederick Henry himself. These works have remained in the Royal Collection of the Netherlands and are on display at the Royal Palace of Amsterdam.

He was able to establish his international fame mainly thanks to the portraits that he made of the delegates to the peace negotiations for the Peace of Münster. Not only were many copies of the paintings made, but they were also widely distributed through engravings after these paintings. As court painter to the Prince of Orange, van Hulle was able to obtain a printing privilege in March 1648. He had reproductions made from his sketches by the leading engravers in Antwerp, such as Paulus Pontius, Conrad Waumans, Cornelis Galle the Younger, Pieter de Jode II and Mattheus Borrekens. The engravings were made on copper plates with a size of approximately 30 x 20 cm (Folio format) and printed on large-format paper sheets of up to 41 x 32 cm. The prints show the bust of the delegate in an oval in which his motto is inscribed, above him the coat of arms of the entity that the delegate represents at the peace negotiations, below the coat of arms of the delegate's family and below this a cartouche with the delegate's titles. The architectural framework of each portrait is in the form of an epitaph which emphasises that the portrait was made for posterity. The delegates approved the final version of the motto, coats of arms and the titles of their portraits. Van Hulle received financial assistance from the city of Münster for his printing project.

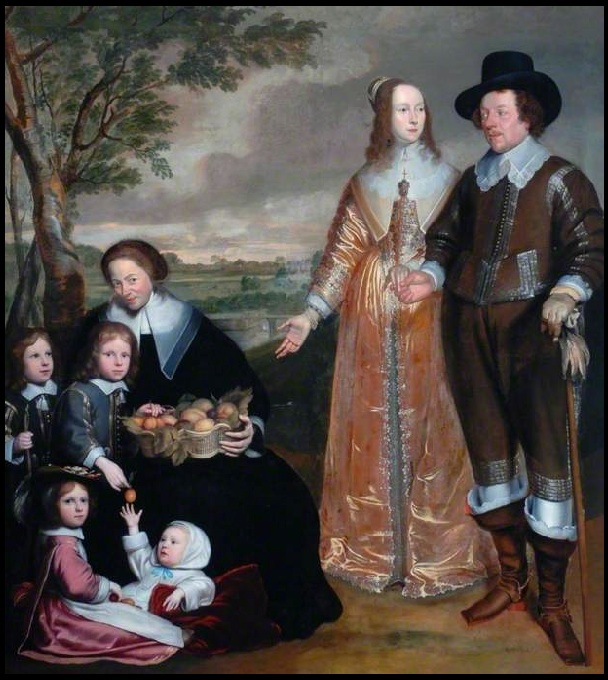
Family portrait group

In 1648 a first edition of the prints was published in Antwerp by Daniel Middeler under the title Celeberrimi legati ad pacificandum Christiani nominis orbem, legati ad Monasterium et Osnabrugas ex omni pene gentium nationumque genera missi. Ad vivum Anselmi v. Hulle penicillo expressi eiusque cura et aere per ingeniores huius aevi sculptores caelo representati. This edition contained about 35 to 37 plates. The engravings were also sold individually, so that each diplomat could assemble a personal selection of portraits and have them bound with a specially printed title page. As a result no two of these anthologies are the same in the selection and sequence of the sitters. In 1648 van Hulle had 39 engravings produced and in 1649 another 43.

In later years van Hulle continued to make portraits of the participants in the negotiations on the implementation of the Peace of Münster in Nuremberg in 1649 and as an itinerant painter at various German princely courts, the Diet of Regensburg of 1653/1654 and the imperial election in Frankfurt in 1657/1658. Finally his collection of portrait paintings and engravings had grown to 132. Many pirated editions were made by Dutch publishers. The Strasbourg publisher Peter Aubry also made a series of 94 re-engravings, which appeared in 1650/51 and which are known from anthologies with 86 or 93 sheets.

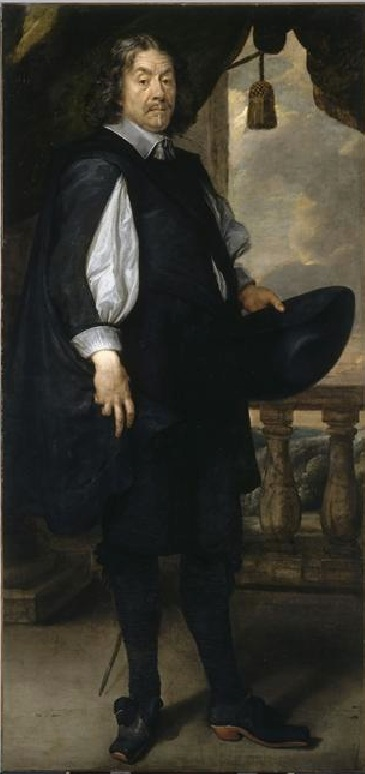
Standing man holding a hat

The collection saw three more editions after van Hulle's death between 1696 and 1717 but the sheets were never numbered. The edition of the prints dated 1696 appeared under the new title of Pacificatores orbis christiani and contained a total of 131 portraits. The 1717 edition had the title Les hommes illustres qui ont vécu dans le XVII. siecle: les principaux potentats, princes, ambassadeurs et plénipotentiaires qui ont assisté aux conferences de Munster et d'Osnabrug avec leurs armes et devises / dessinez et peints au naturel par le fameux Anselme van Hulle, peintre de Frederic Henri de Nassau, Prince D'Orange, et gravez par les plus habiles maîtres ('Portraits of the famous men who lived in the 17th century: the principal potentates, princes, ambassadors and plenipotentiaries who participated in the conferences of Münster and Osnabrück with their coats of arms and mottos, drawn and painted from life by the famous Anselm van Hulle, painter of Frederick Henry of Nassau, Prince of Orange and engraved by the most capable masters').
