= Alexander Voet the Younger =

Flemish engraver

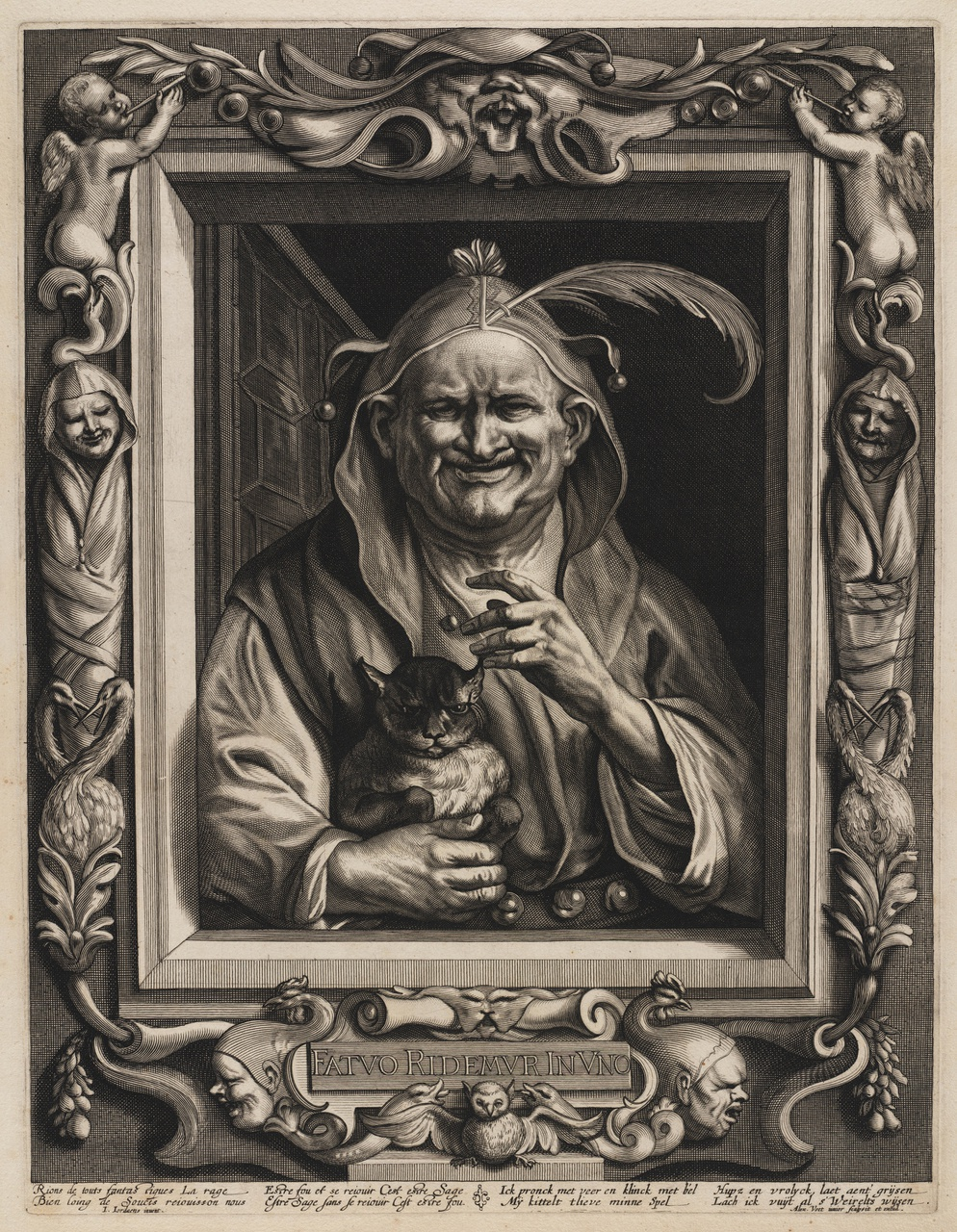
Old fool with his cat, after Jordaens

Alexander Voet the Younger or Alexander Voet II (27 June 1637, in Antwerp – 1693/1705) was a Flemish engraver, print artist and publisher. He was the son of Alexander Voet the Elder, one of the leading engravers and publishers in Antwerp in the middle and second half of the 17th century. He first worked in his father's large workshop and later operated his own workshop.

== Life ==
Alexander Voet the Younger was born in Antwerp on 27 June 1637 as the son of Alexander Voet the Elder, a leading printmaker and publisher in Antwerp. Alexander trained under his father as well as under the prominent engraver Paulus Pontius, one of the key printmakers in Rubens' workshop.

He travelled to Rome where he was recorded in 1661. Upon his return he became a member of the Antwerp Guild of Saint Luke in 1662. He married Jeanne Marie van Leest on 14 January 1663.

In 1665 he moved to Ghent where he resided and remained active until about 1689. He was also again active in Antwerp from 1681.

== Work ==
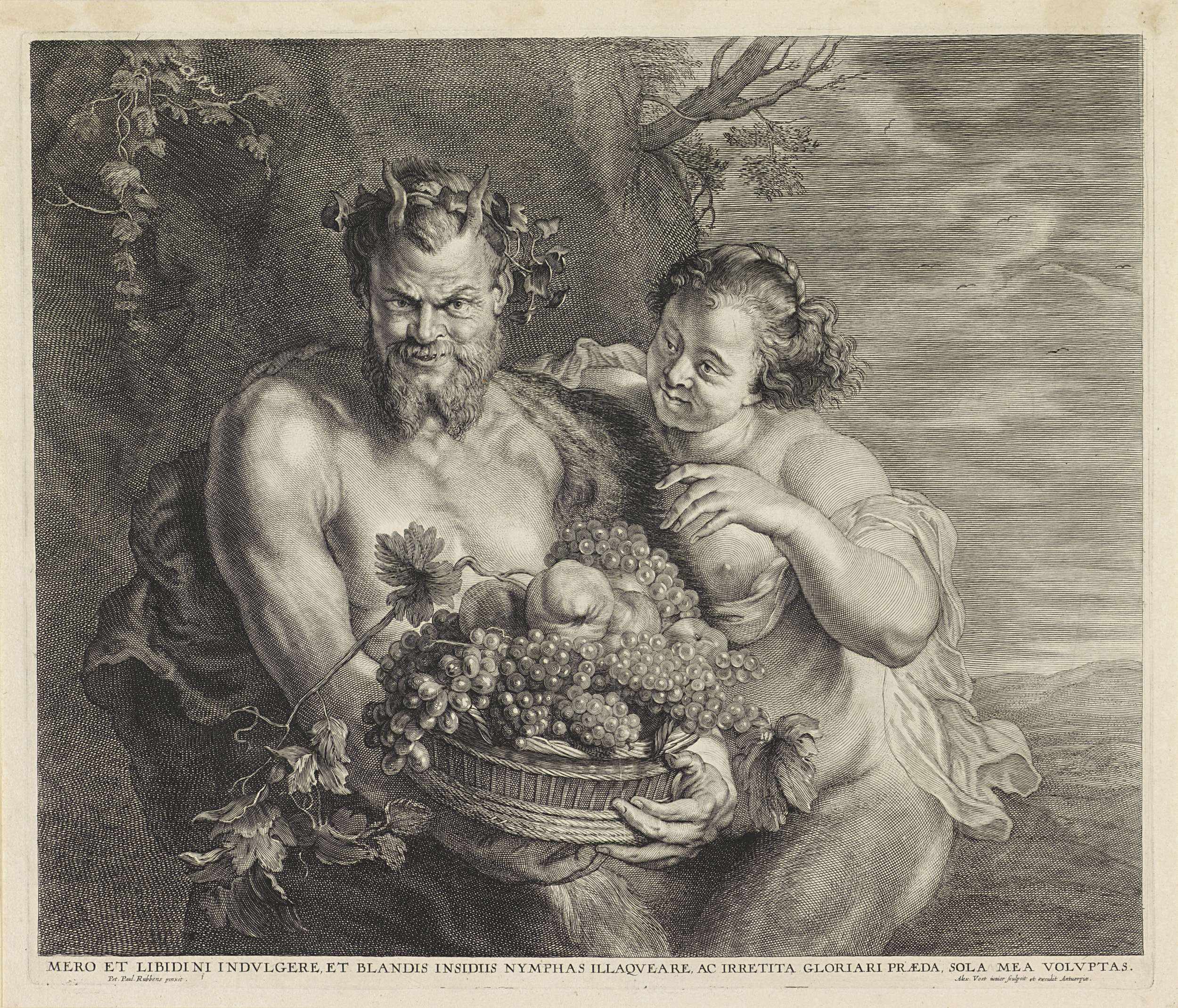
Satyr and Bacchante, after Rubens

Like his father, he did not engrave all works signed by him but had them produced by collaborators in his workshop.

Alexander Voet was a reproductive artist who made prints after the works of contemporary Antwerp masters such as Rubens, Jacob Jordaens and others. An example is the Old fool with his cat, which he made and published after a design by Jordaens. The composition recalls a painting of The woman, the fool and his cat of the mid-1640s by Jordaens (private collection) and also uses a decorative frame border reminiscent of Jordaens' tapestry designs.

Stylistically his style of engraving is close to that of Paulus Pontius and of his father. As a result, it has not always been possible to identify whether the father or son were responsible for engraving a particular print.

He worked on many of the devotional publications of the Catholic monastic orders. He was also active as a retoucher and engraver for the Plantin-Moretus Press in Antwerp.
