= Mattheus Borrekens =

Flemish engraver

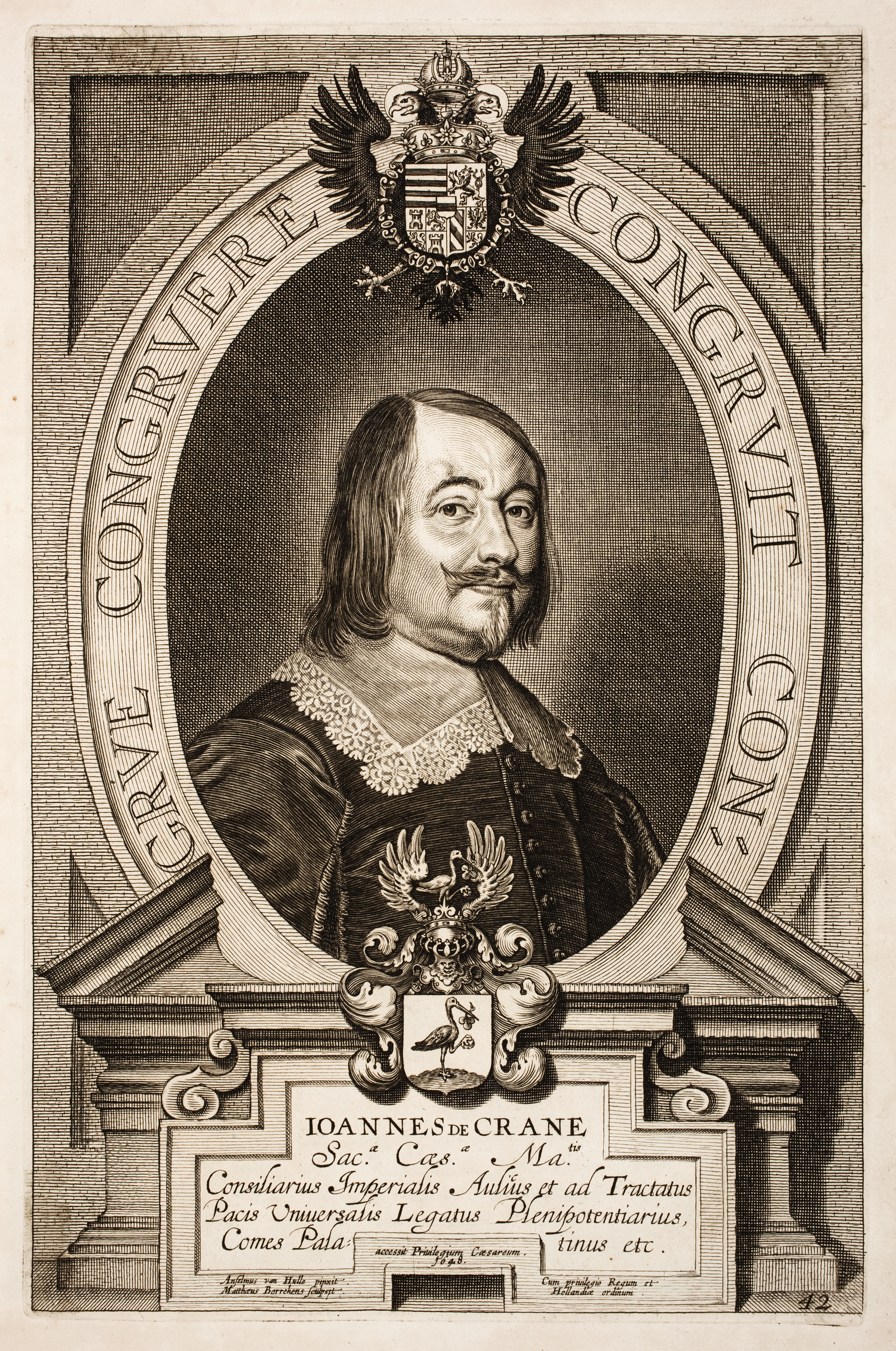
Portrait of Johann Krane

Mattheus Borrekens or Mattheus Borkens (Antwerp, baptized on 7 July 1615 – Antwerp, 25 December 1670) was a Flemish engraver, printmaker and draughtsman. He was a reproductive artist and worked on some important publications in the Southern Netherlands. He mainly treated Christian religious subjects and portraits.

== Life ==
Mattheus Borrekens was born in Antwerp where he was baptized on 7 July 1615. He was the son of Abraham Borrekens and Elisabeth Janssens. His older brother Jan Baptist later became a painter and art dealer. Borrekens trained with Pieter de Jode the Younger and was registered as his pupil at the Antwerp Guild of Saint Luke in the guild year 1634–1635. Borrekens became a master of the Antwerp Guild of Saint Luke in the guild year 1635–1636.

He married Anna Uyt ten Eeckhout on 1 October 1639. The couple would have 9 children. Borrekens was active as a reproductive printmaker who made prints after the works of leading Flemish artists. He was also a captain of the local civil militia and was therefore referred to as Capiteyn Matthias Borckens.

He died in Antwerp on 25 December 1670.

== Work ==
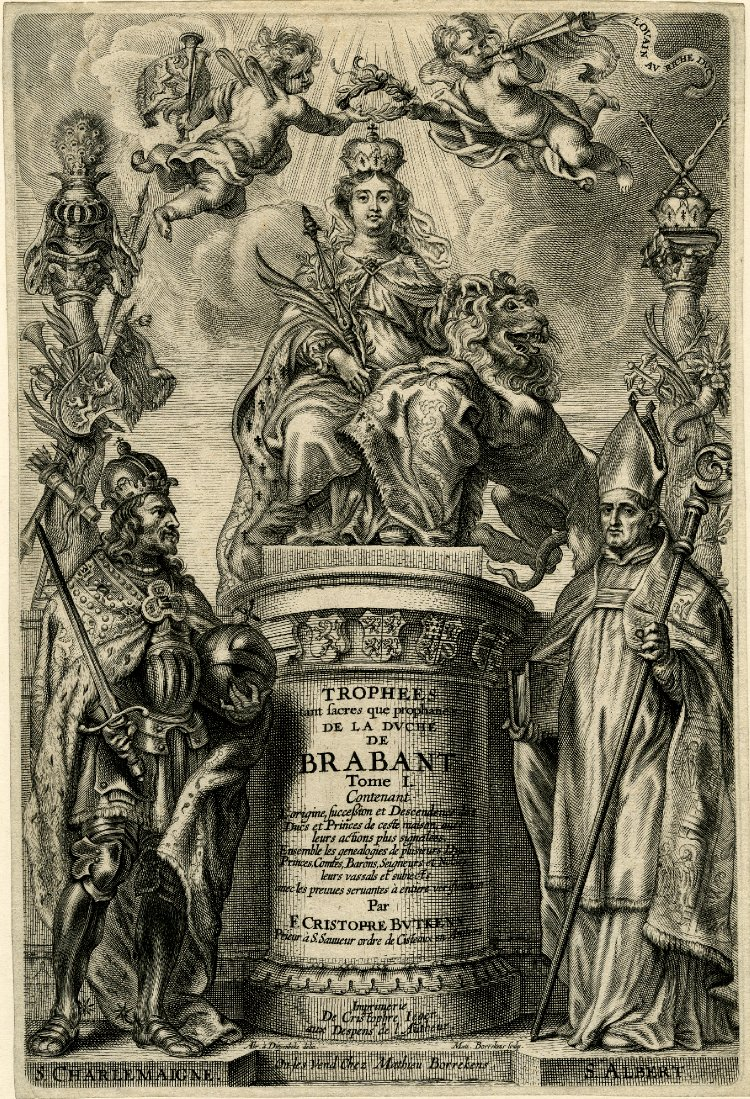
Frontispiece of Christophe Butkens' Trophées tant sacres que prophanes de la Duché de Brabant

Mattheus Borrekens was mainly a reproductive printmaker. He made prints after the work of leading Flemish painters of his time such as Rubens, van Dyck, Erasmus Quellinus the Younger, Abraham van Diepenbeeck, Jan Thomas van Ieperen, Pieter van Lint and Cornelis Schut. He mainly concentrated on Christian religious subjects and portraits. He also engraved frontispieces of publications such as Christophe Butkens'sTrophées tant sacrés et profanes du Duché de Brabant. 1724–1726. For this publication he engraved after a design by van Diepenbeeck. His style is close to that of Paulus Pontius. He often engraved prints for the art market after the creations of other printmakers but also created his own designs.

He collaborated on an important publication of portraits of the delegates to the peace negotiations for the Peace of Münster. This was a publication project of the Flemish painter Anselm van Hulle who was present in Münster where he had made portraits of the delegates to the conference. As court painter to the Prince of Orange, van Hulle had been able to obtain a printing privilege in March 1648. He had reproductions made from his sketches by Mattheus Borrekens and other leading engravers in Antwerp, such as Paulus Pontius, Coenraet Waumans, Cornelis Galle the Younger and Pieter de Jode II. The engravings were made on copper plates with a size of approximately 30 x 20 cm (Folio format) and printed on large-format paper sheets of up to 41 x 32 cm. The prints show the bust of the delegate in an oval in which his motto is inscribed, above him the coat of arms of the entity that the delegate represents at the peace negotiations, below the coat of arms of the delegate's family and below this a cartouche with the delegate's titles. The architectural framework of each portrait is in the form of an epitaph which emphasises that the portrait was made for posterity.

In 1648 a first edition of the prints was published in Antwerp by Daniel Middeler under the title Celeberrimi legati ad pacificandum Christiani nominis orbem, legati ad Monasterium et Osnabrugas ex omni pene gentium nationumque genera missi. Ad vivum Anselmi v. Hulle penicillo expressi eiusque cura et aere per ingeniores huius aevi sculptores caelo representati. This edition contained about 35 to 37 plates. The engravings were also sold individually, so that each diplomat could assemble a personal selection of portraits and have them bound with a specially printed title page. As a result, no two of these anthologies are the same in the selection and sequence of the sitters. In 1648 van Hulle had 39 engravings produced and in 1649 another 43. Borrekens created original engravings for this publication such as the portrait of Willem Ripperda, Johann Krane and others. These works show his ability in the creation of large format engravings and the design of the rich emblems.
