= Michel Natalis =

Engraver from Liège (1610–1668)

- Extasis of St. Paul, engraved by Natalis after Nicolas Poussin, Rijksmuseum, Amsterdam
- Born: Michael Noël; 10 October 1610; Liège, Spanish Netherlands
- Died: 3 September 1668 (aged 57); Liège, Spanish Netherlands
- Occupation: Engraver
- Movement: Baroque

Michael Noël, better known with the Latinised name Michel Natalis (10 October 1610 – 3 September 1668), was a Flemish Baroque engraver. He is considered the most important figure of the Liège school of engravers.

== Biography ==
Michel Natalis was the son of Jérôme Noël, a die engraver at the Liège mint, and Marie de Stoumont. He was a pupil of his father, and of Charles de Mallery. Between 1633 and 1639, he lived in Rome, where he became acquainted with the German painter and engraver Joachim von Sandrart. While in Rome, the banker Vincenzo Giustiniani commissioned him, along with several other artists, to create a series of engravings reproducing his collection of antiquities. Other contributors to this project included Pieter de Bailliu, Claude Mellan, Cornelis Bloemaert and Theodor Matham.

In 1639, Michel returned to Liège to marry Marie Faucaulmont, with whom he had several children. Between 1640 and 1642, he worked in Antwerp, producing engravings based on drawings by Abraham van Diepenbeeck, and collaborating with the publisher Martinus van den Enden the Elder. In 1647, Sébastien Bourdon commissioned him to create an engraving based on his painting The Holy Family. In 1648, he returned to Liège, where he was appointed the official engraver to Prince-Bishop Maximilian Henry of Bavaria, for whom he also engraved coins.

In 1653, he became the court engraver of the Elector of Cologne, and in 1658 he was invited to Frankfurt to create a portrait of the Holy Roman Emperor Leopold I on the occasion of his coronation. From 1661 onwards, he spent most of his life in Paris, where he associated with two other renowned engravers from Liège: Jean Varin and Jean Valdor the Younger. In 1668, Louis XIV granted him an annual pension and offered him accommodation at the Louvre Palace and the title of chief court engraver (premier graveur). However, Natalis died in his hometown on 3 September 1668, before he could leave for the capital.

== Gallery ==
Venus and Mars, engraved by Natalis after Titian, Rijksmuseum, Amsterdam

Allegory of Divine Providence, engraved by Natalis after Andrea Sacchi, 1642, Rijksmuseum, Amsterdam

The drunken Silenus tied up in his sleep by the nymph Aegle, engraved by Natalis after Giovanni Francesco Romanelli, 1632–1633, Rijksmuseum, Amsterdam

Holy Family with Elizabeth and John the Baptist, engraved by Natalis after Nicolas Poussin, Rijksmuseum, Amsterdam

Contest between Minerva and Neptune, engraved by Natalis after Andrea Camassei, 1632–1633, Rijksmuseum, Amsterdam

Christ in the House of the Pharisee, engraved by Natalis after Peter Paul Rubens, 1640–1642, Rijksmuseum, Amsterdam

== Bibliography ==
- de Chestret de Haneffe, Baron (1899). "NATALIS (Michel)". Biographie Nationale de Belgique (PDF). Vol. XV. Bruxelles: Académie royale des sciences, des lettres et des beaux-arts de Belgique. pp. 481–486. ISSN 0770-7150..
- "Vallet, Guillaume". Benezit Dictionary of Artists. Oxford: Oxford University Press. 2011. doi:10.1093/benz/9780199773787.article.B00128873.
