= Frans van den Wyngaerde =

Flemish printmaker and publisher

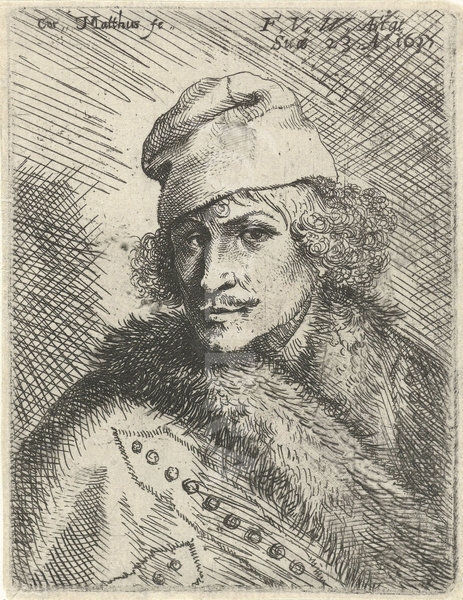
- Self-portrait etched by van den Wyngaerde
- Born: 1614
- Died: 17 March 1679 (aged 51–52); Antwerp, Brabant, Spain
- Known for: Printmaking and publishing

Frans van den Wyngaerde or Frans van den Wijngaerde (baptised 8 July 1614 – 17 March 1679) was a Flemish printmaker, draughtsman and publisher. One of the leading print publishers in 17th-century Antwerp, he created and published multiple reproductive prints after Peter Paul Rubens, Anthony van Dyck as well as foreign artists.

== Life ==
Frans van den Wyngaerde was born in 1614 to a family of fishmongers. He was baptized in Antwerp on 8 July that year. Van den Wyngaerde became an apprentice of the Rubens collaborator Paulus Pontius (1603–1658) when he was about 14 years old. He was enrolled as a master in the Antwerp Guild of St. Luke from the Guild year 1636–1637. Lacking sufficient funds, the dean of the guild loaned him part of the membership fee.

The artist was successful and in 1640, he married Maria Cruyt, the daughter of wealthy merchants. He became a captain of a local schutterij, a civil guard.

By the middle of the 17th century, van den Wyngaerde had become a leading publisher of prints in Antwerp, along with Martinus van den Enden the Elder, Gillis Hendricx (?-1677) and Joannes Meyssens. He died in 1679 with substantial assets.

== Work ==
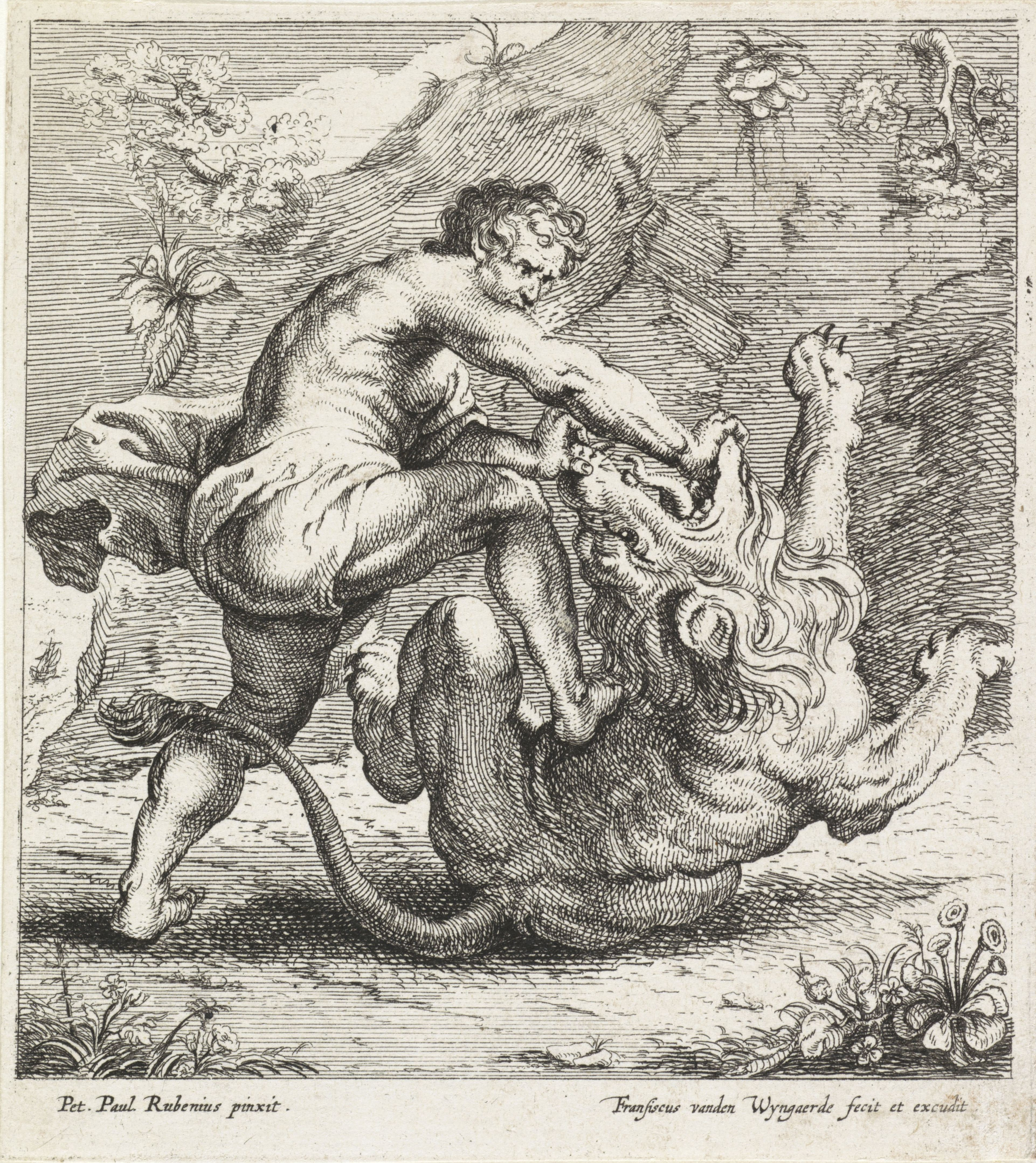
Samson killing the lion, after Rubens

Van den Wyngaerde was active as a reproductive artist as well as an original artist creating his own designs.

Van den Wyngaerde's prints after his own original designs include etchings, engravings and plates in which both techniques are used. His subject matter ranges from religious scenes and allegories to genre scenes and portraits. He made a series of 50 portraits of Catholic cardinals, 11 illustrations of battle scenes for a book and 26 sheets of illustrations of emblems for a religious book.

In addition to publishing his own work and that of his contemporaries, van den Wyngaerde reused old plates by well-established artists to which he added his name and then reissued. He published seven plates by Jusepe de Ribera, a Spanish artist working in Naples.
