= Speculum Orbis Terrae =

1593 atlas by Cornelis de Jode

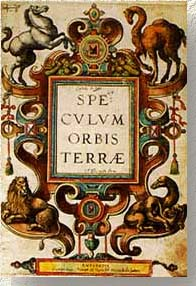
Title page of Speculum Orbis Terrae.

Speculum Orbis Terrae ("Mirror of the World") was an atlas published by Cornelis de Jode in Antwerp in 1593. The atlas was largely a continuation of unfinished works of his father, Gerard de Jode, who died in 1591. Contemporary scholars consider many of de Jode's maps to be superior, both in detail and style, to those of the competing atlas of the time, Theatrum Orbis Terrarum, by Ortelius. However, de Jode's atlas never sold well.

After de Jode's death in 1600, the engraving plates were sold to J. B. Vrients (who also owned the Ortelius plates), and the complete work was not published again.

== Gallery ==
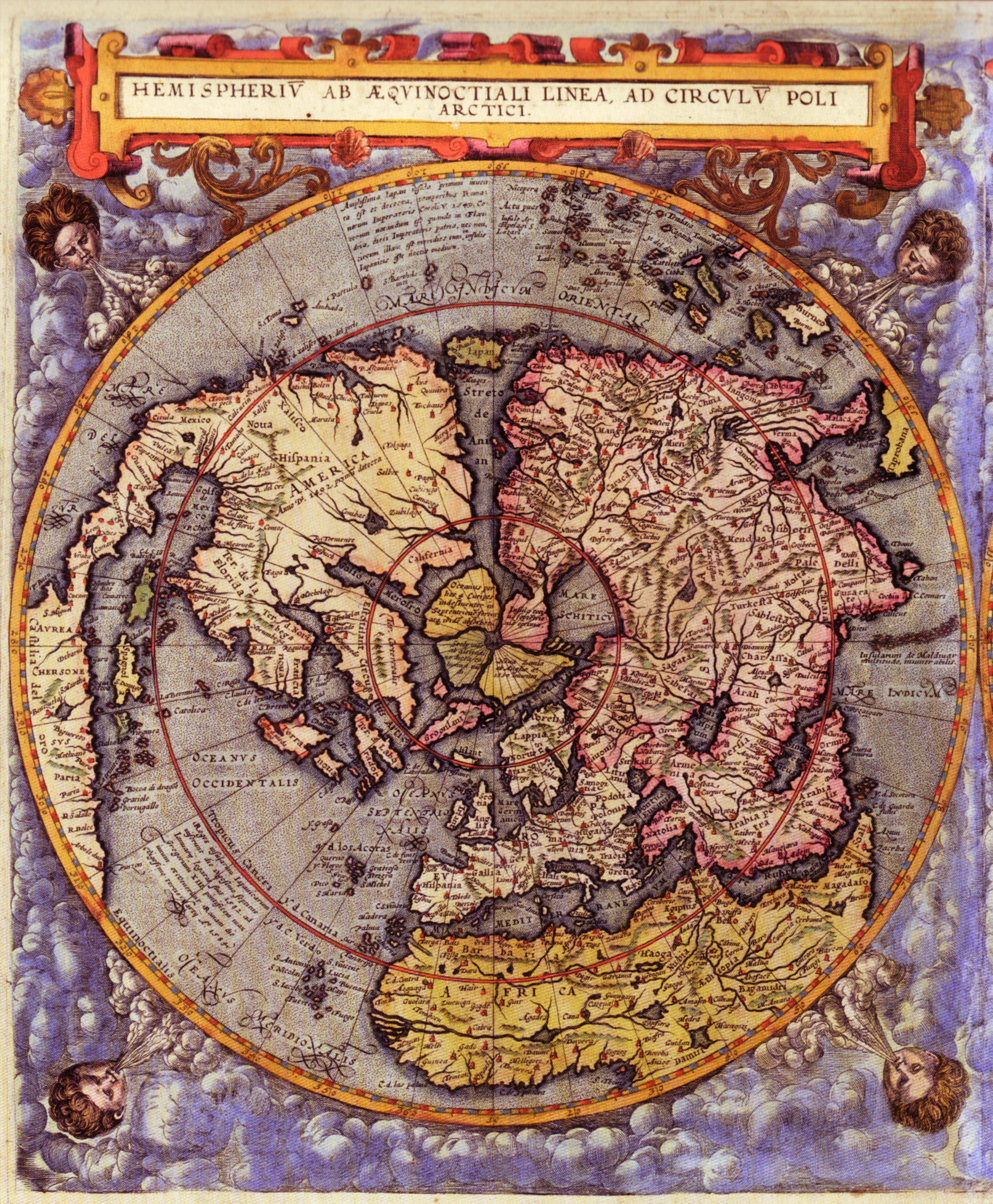
Map of the Northern hemisphere. Color print from copper engraving (printer Arnold Coninx), Antwerp, 1593.

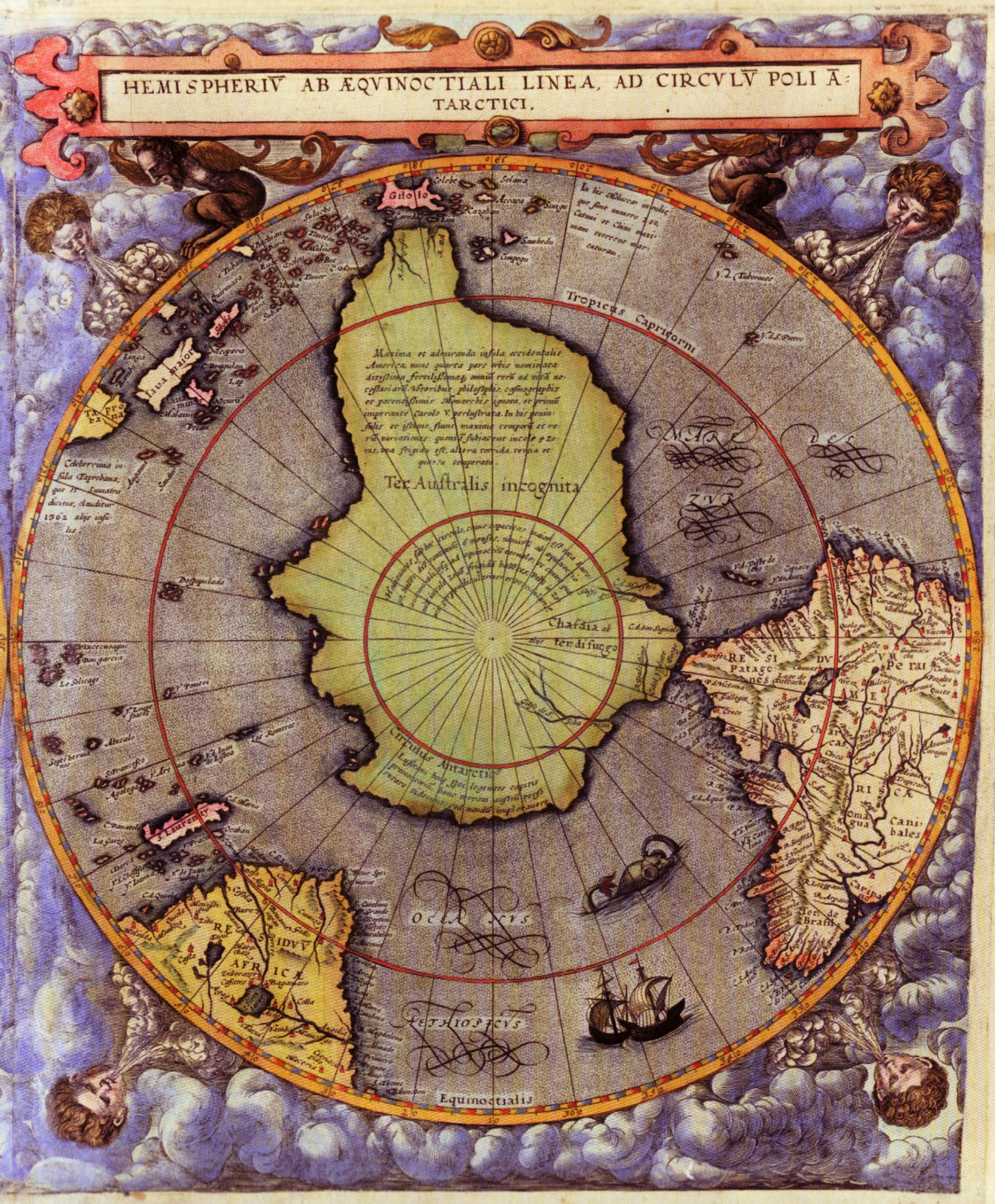
Map of the Southern hemisphere.

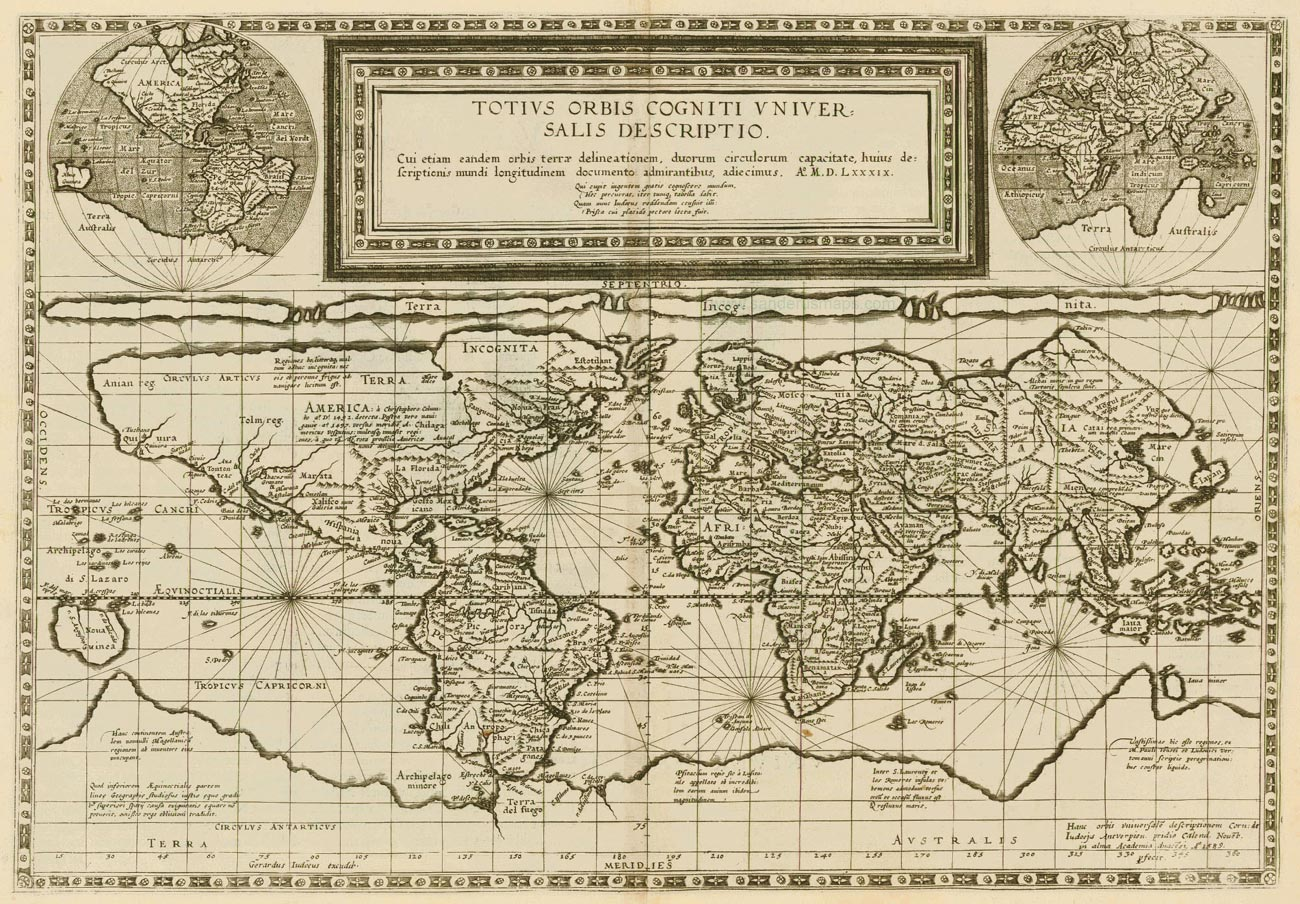
The known world from Speculum Orbis Terrae, 1593.
