= Pieter de Jode II =

Flemish printmaker (1606–1674)

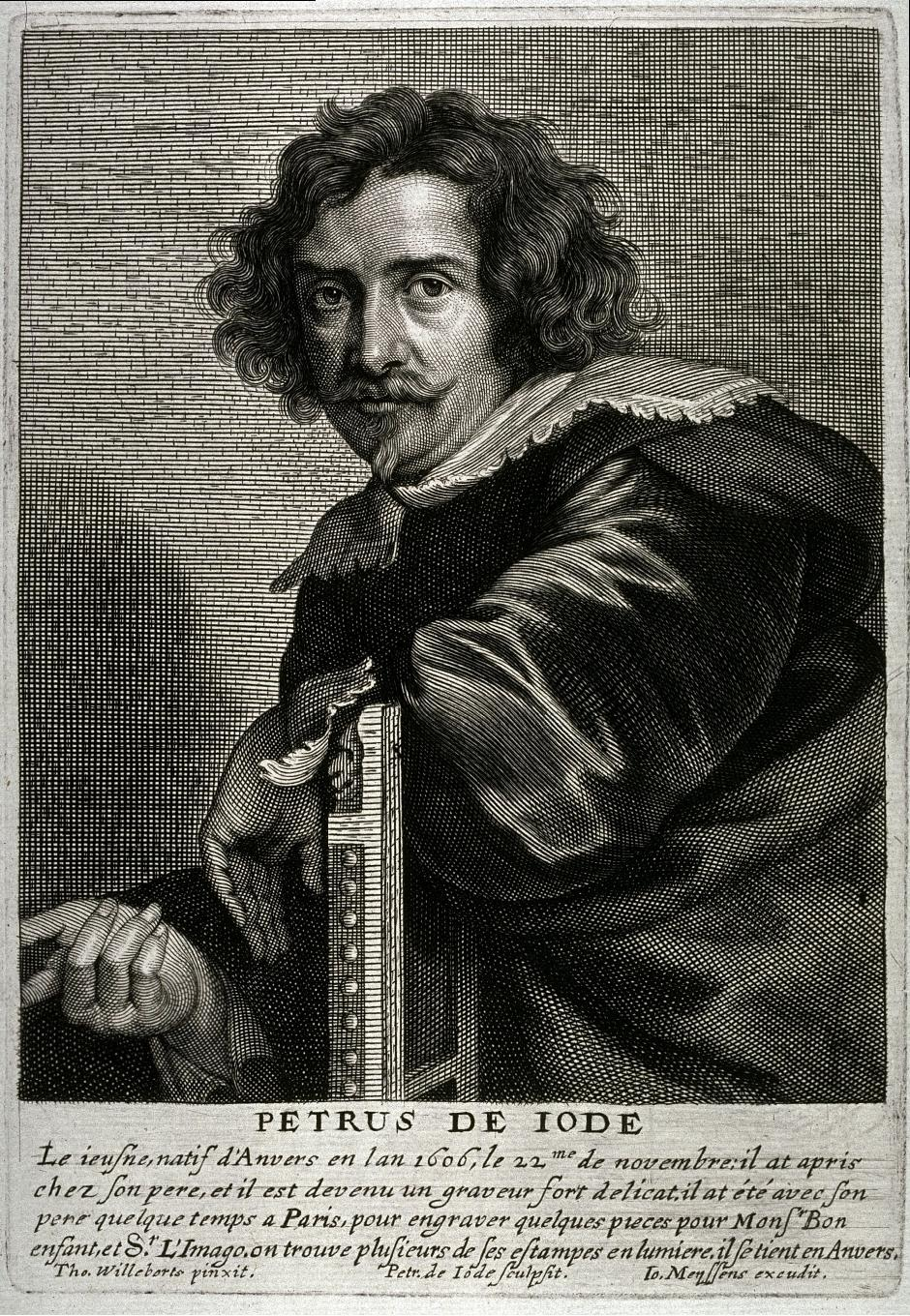
- Pieter de Jode II after Thomas Willeboirts Bosschaert
- Born: 1606; Antwerp
- Died: in or after 1674 (aged 67–68)
- Known for: Printmaking

Pieter de Jode II or Pieter de Jode the Younger (1606–1674) was a Flemish Baroque printmaker, draughtsman, painter and art dealer. A scion of an important dynasty of printmakers active in Antwerp, he created many prints after the works of leading painters and was a close collaborator of Anthony van Dyck for whom he engraved many portraits.

== Life ==
Pieter de Jode II was born in Antwerp in 1606, where he was baptized on 24 November of that year. He learned drawing and engraving from his father, Pieter de Jode I (1570–1634), a leading printmaker in Antwerp who had travelled to Italy and whose engravings were a source for the Flemish painter and artist biographer Karel van Mander. His grandfather was the cartographer and printmaker Gerard de Jode. He was admitted as a master of the Antwerp Guild of Saint Luke in the Guild year 1628–1629.

He travelled to Paris with his father in 1631–1632 to work on some print projects mainly of portraits. On his return in 1635 de Jode married Elizabeth Loemans, the daughter of the Antwerp engraver Aernout Loemans. Their son Arnold (1638–1667) was baptized on 10 March 1638. He would later visit England where his son Arnold who had studied with him was working as a printmaker. Mattheus Borrekens was also a pupil of Pieter de Jode II in 1634–35.

When his first wife died in 1642, the inventory made showed they were relatively prosperous. De Jode remarried in 1648 to Clara van den Enden, the sister or daughter of the publisher Martinus van den Enden the Elder. His second wife died around 1653.

It is not clear when and where he died. Possibly he died in England in or after 1674, the date of his last known print.

== Work ==
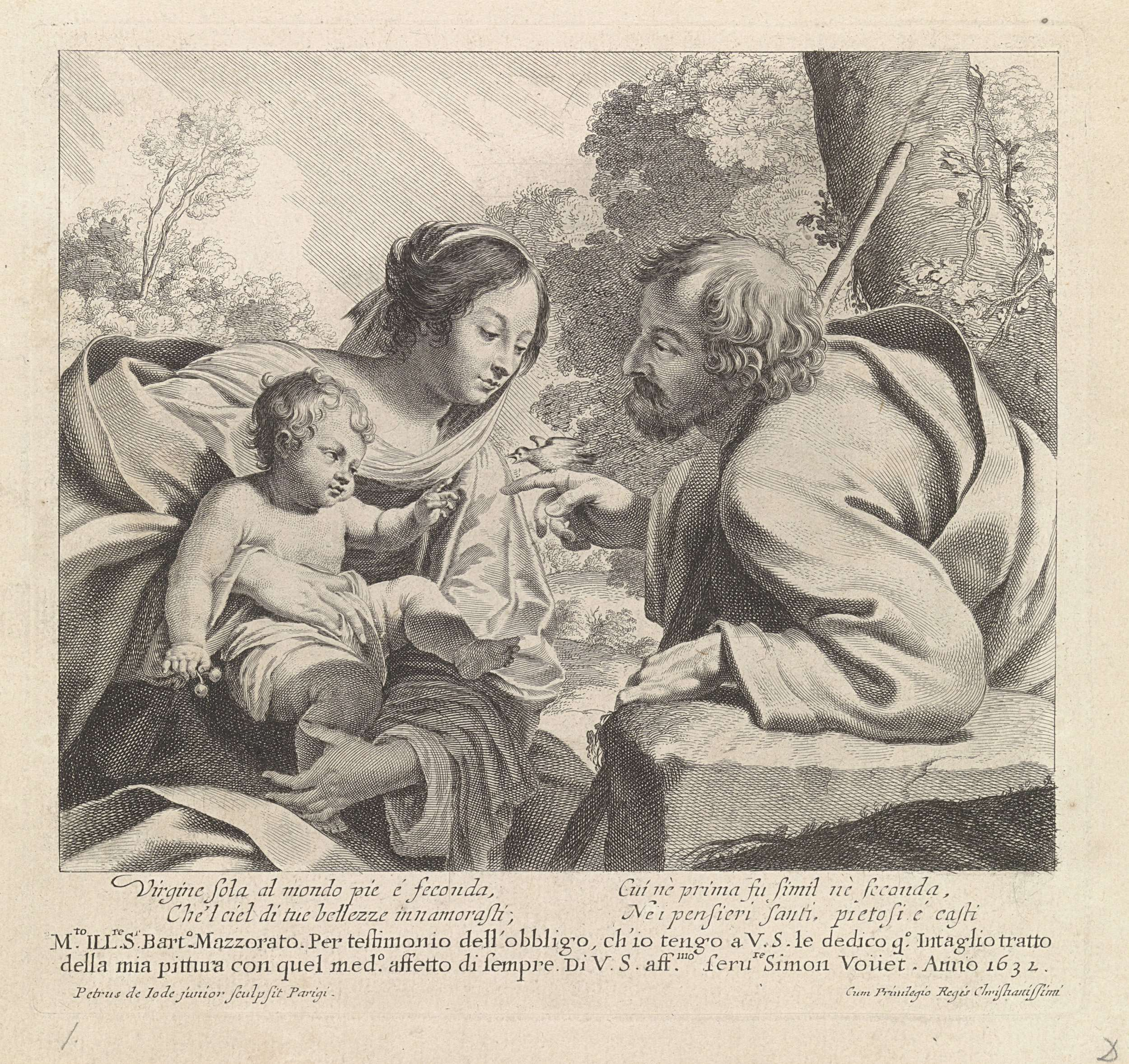
Landscape with the Holy Family after Simon Vouet

It has been difficult to distinguish the works of Pieter de Jode the elder and Pieter the younger, since the latter likely only signed his prints with junior before his father's death in 1634. His earliest prints reflect the dry style and technique of his father but he later developed a looser, more painterly style.

He and his father were among the engravers selected by Anthony van Dyck for his Iconographie, a series that was published over several decades and was a compendium of portraits of famous people.

After the death of van Dyck, he continued to work on the Iconographie series, in collaboration with other engravers employed by the publisher Gillis Hendricx in Antwerp. He would also work on portrait series for other publishers as well as have an extensive practice as a reproductive artist.
