= Cornelis de Jode =

- Born: 1568; Antwerp, Spanish Netherlands
- Died: 17 October 1600 (aged 31–32); Mons, Spanish Netherlands
- Scientific career
- Fields: Cartography

Cornelis de Jode (1568 – 17 October 1600) was a cartographer, engraver and publisher from Antwerp. He was the son of Gerard de Jode, also a cartographer. Cornelis studied science at Academy of Douai

When his father died in 1591, Cornelis de Jode took over the work on his father's uncompleted atlas, which he eventually published in 1593 as Speculum Orbis Terrae . Despite that contemporary scholars consider many of de Jode's maps to be copies of both Portuguese and Spanish cartographers in detail and style of atlas of the time Theatrum Orbis Terrarum by Ortelius, de Jode's atlas never sold well due to his plagiarism.

After his death, the engraving plates were sold to J. B. Vrients (who also owned the Ortelius plates), and the complete work was not published again.

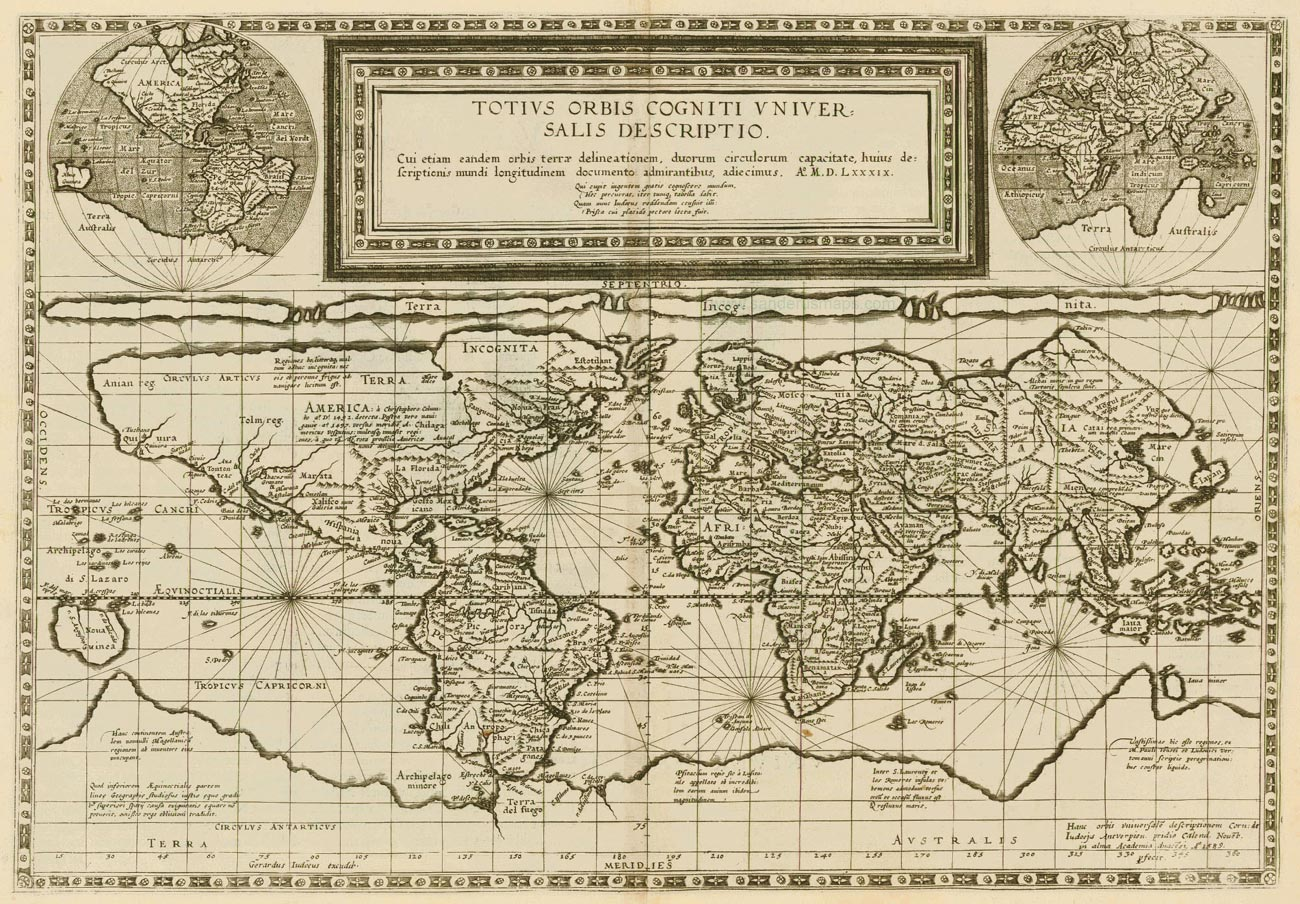
The Known World, from Speculum Orbis Terrae, 1593.

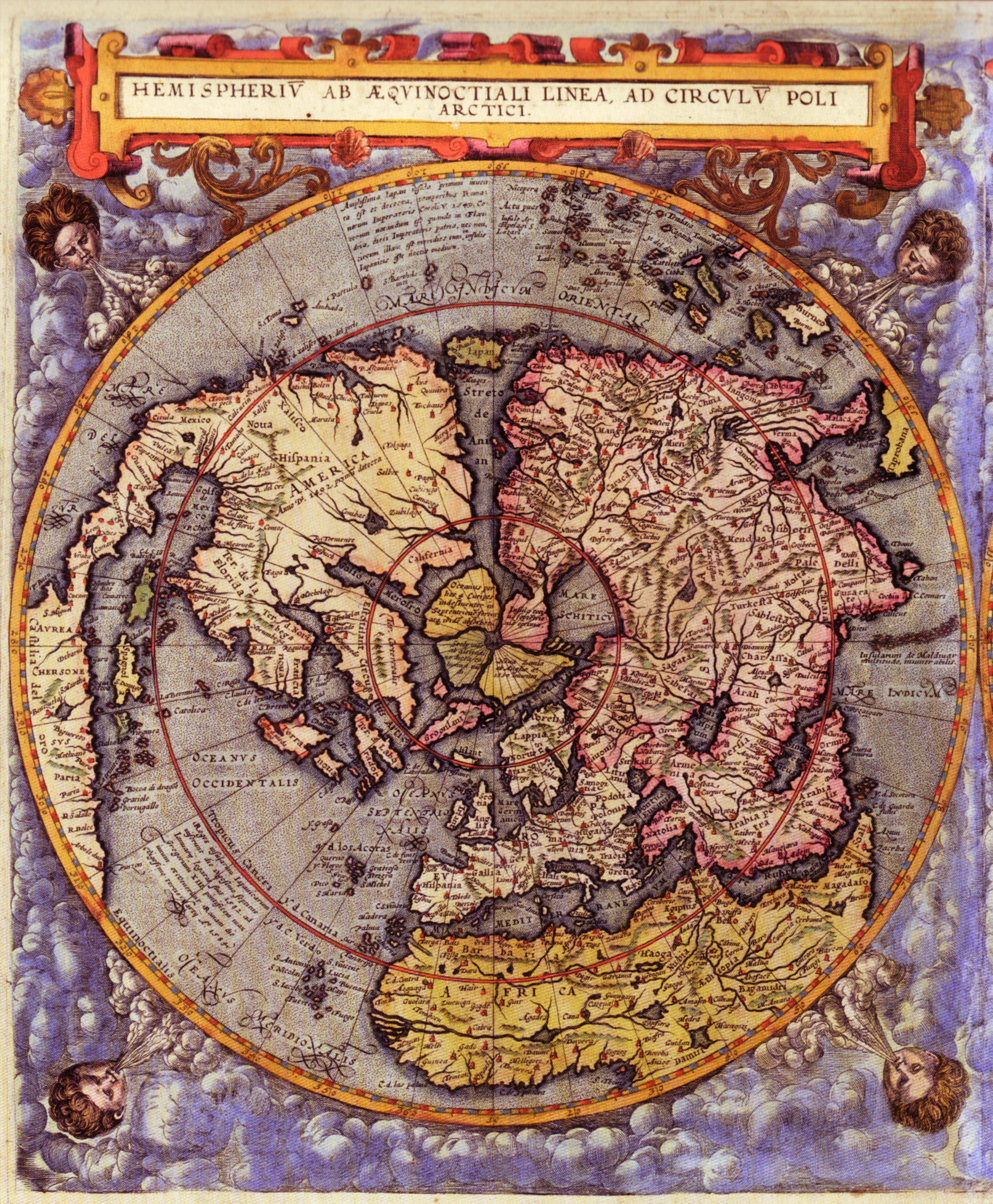
The Northern Hemisphere, also from Speculum Orbis Terrae, 1593. Note the unusual perspective from a position above the north pole.

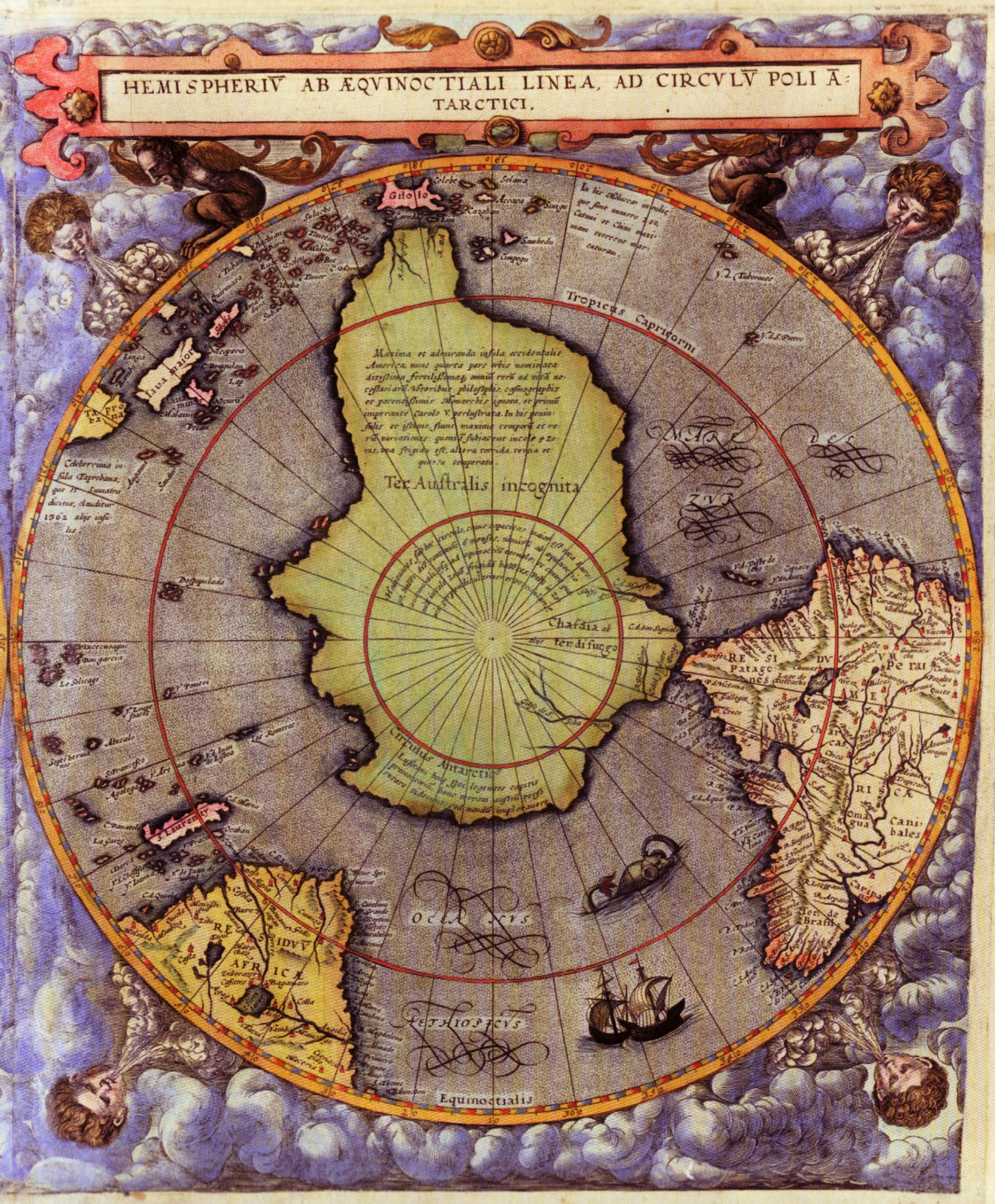
The Southern Hemisphere. Color print from copper engraving (printer Arnold Coninx).
