= Arnold de Jode =

Flemish painter (born 1638)

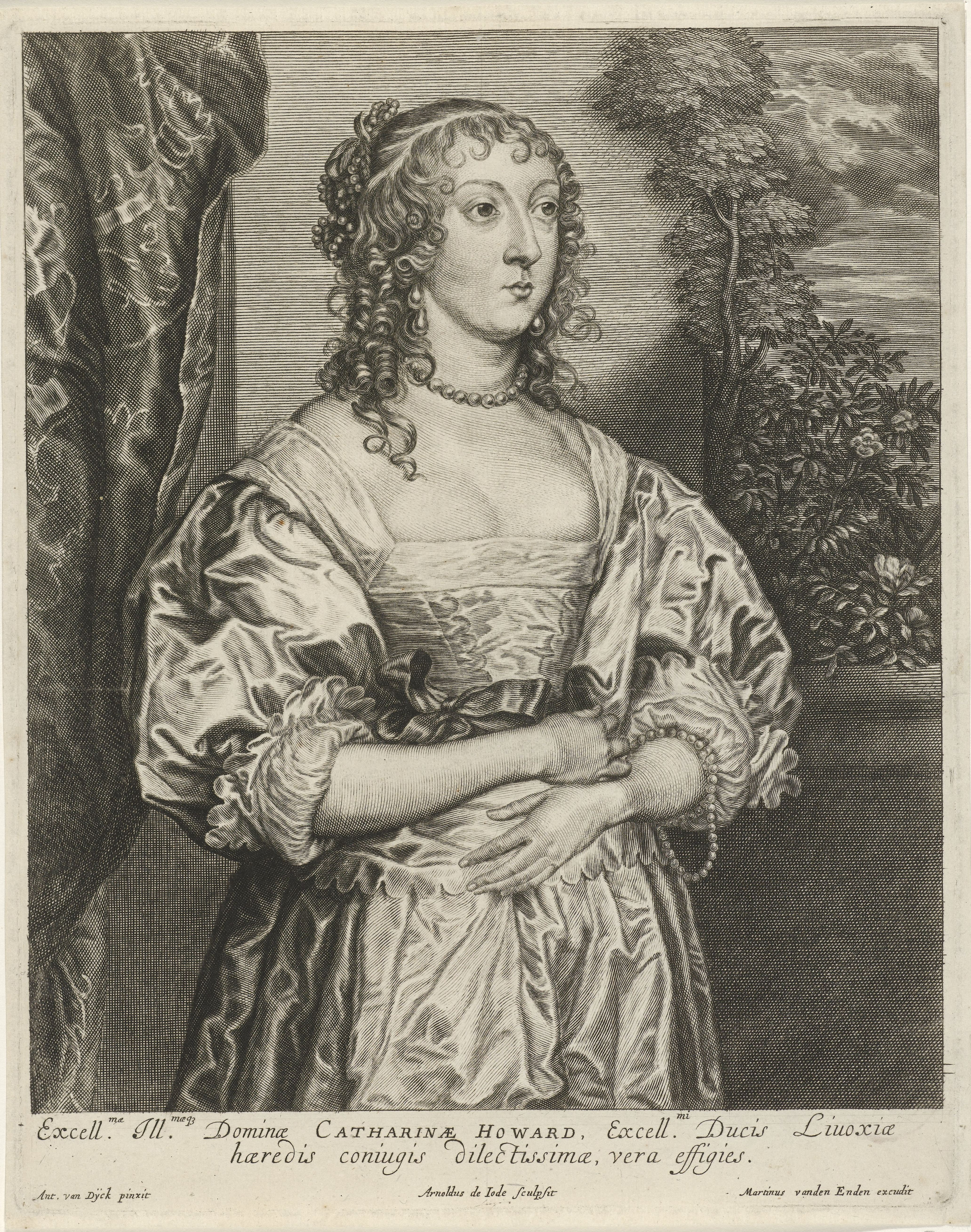
Portrait of Katherine Howard, after a painting by Anthony van Dyck

Arnold de Jode, the son of Pieter de Jode, the younger, was born at Antwerp in 1638. He was instructed in engraving by his father, but he never rose above mediocrity. He worked in the Netherlands and in Spain, and was in England in 1666, the year of the Great Fire of London, and in 1667. His best prints are portraits, though they are but indifferent. Among other plates, the following are by him:

== Portraits ==
- Cardinal Pallavicini; after Titian.
- Catharine Howard, Duchess of Lennox; after van Dyck.
- Sir Peter Lely; after Lely.
- Alexander Browne; prefixed to his 'Ars Pictoria'; after Huysmans.

== Various subjects ==
- The Education of Cupid; after Venus with Mercury and Cupid ('The School of Love') by Correggio. 1667.
- The Magdalen; oval; after Van Dyck.
- The Infant Christ embracing St. John; after the same; inscribed Arnoldus de Jode, sculp. Londini, tempore incendii maximi.
- A Landscape; after L. De Vadder. 1658.
- Some other Landscapes; after Jacques Fouquières.
