= Gerard de Jode =

Dutch cartographer (died 1591)

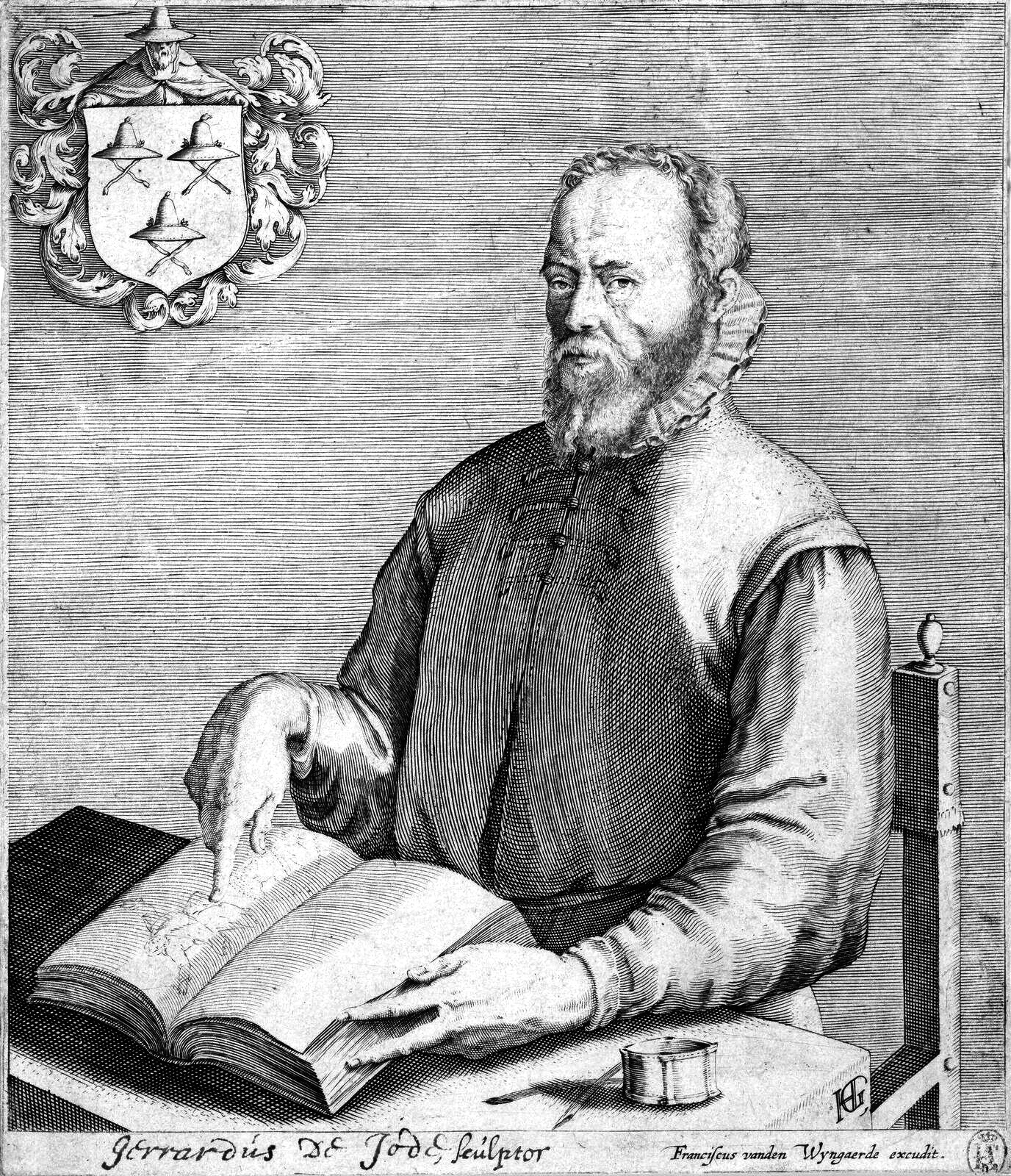
- Engraving by Hendrick Goltzius, c. 1580–1590
- Born: c. 1511; Nijmegen
- Died: 5 February 1591 (aged 79–80); Antwerp
- Other names: Geerardus de Jode; Petrus de Jode
- Occupations: Cartographer, engraver, publisher

Gerard de Jode (also known as Petrus de Jode; c. 1511 – 5 February 1591) was a Netherlandish cartographer, engraver, and publisher who lived and worked in Antwerp.

In 1547, De Jode was admitted to the Guild of St. Luke, and began his work as a publisher. He frequently printed the works of other cartographers, including Giacomo Gastaldi's world map in 1555, Jacob van Deventer's map of the Duchy of Brabant in 1558, and Ortelius' eight-sheet world map in 1564.

== Background ==
His most outstanding work is a two volume atlas Speculum Orbis Terrarum published in 1578. It was aimed at competing with another atlas, Theatrum Orbis Terrarum by Ortelius, published eight years earlier in 1570. The competing atlas had become so popular by the time he finally published his own atlas however, that his version never sold well, despite his outstanding reputation. Only about a dozen examples have survived.

De Jode made plans for another enlarged edition, which was uncompleted at his death in 1591. His son Cornelis de Jode took over and published the Speculum Orbis Terrae in 1593. This never sold well either. Scholars consider many of De Jode's maps to be superior to those of Ortelius, both in detail and style.

In constructing his world map, Hemispherium Ab Æquinoctiali Linea, Ad Circulum Poli Antarctici, published in 1593, De Jode was strongly influenced by Guillaume Postel's 1581 polar planisphère, Polo aptata Nova Charta Universi. De Jode was probably the maker of a globe made in Antwerp that also owes much to the cosmographic ideas of Guillaume Postel.

Speculum Orbis Terrarum was once the object of an attempted theft from the Beinecke Rare Book and Manuscript Library, by rare map thief Forbes Smiley. Smiley was caught and arrested after a library staff member found his X-Acto knife on the floor.
