= Paulus Pontius =

Flemish engraver and painter (1603–1658)

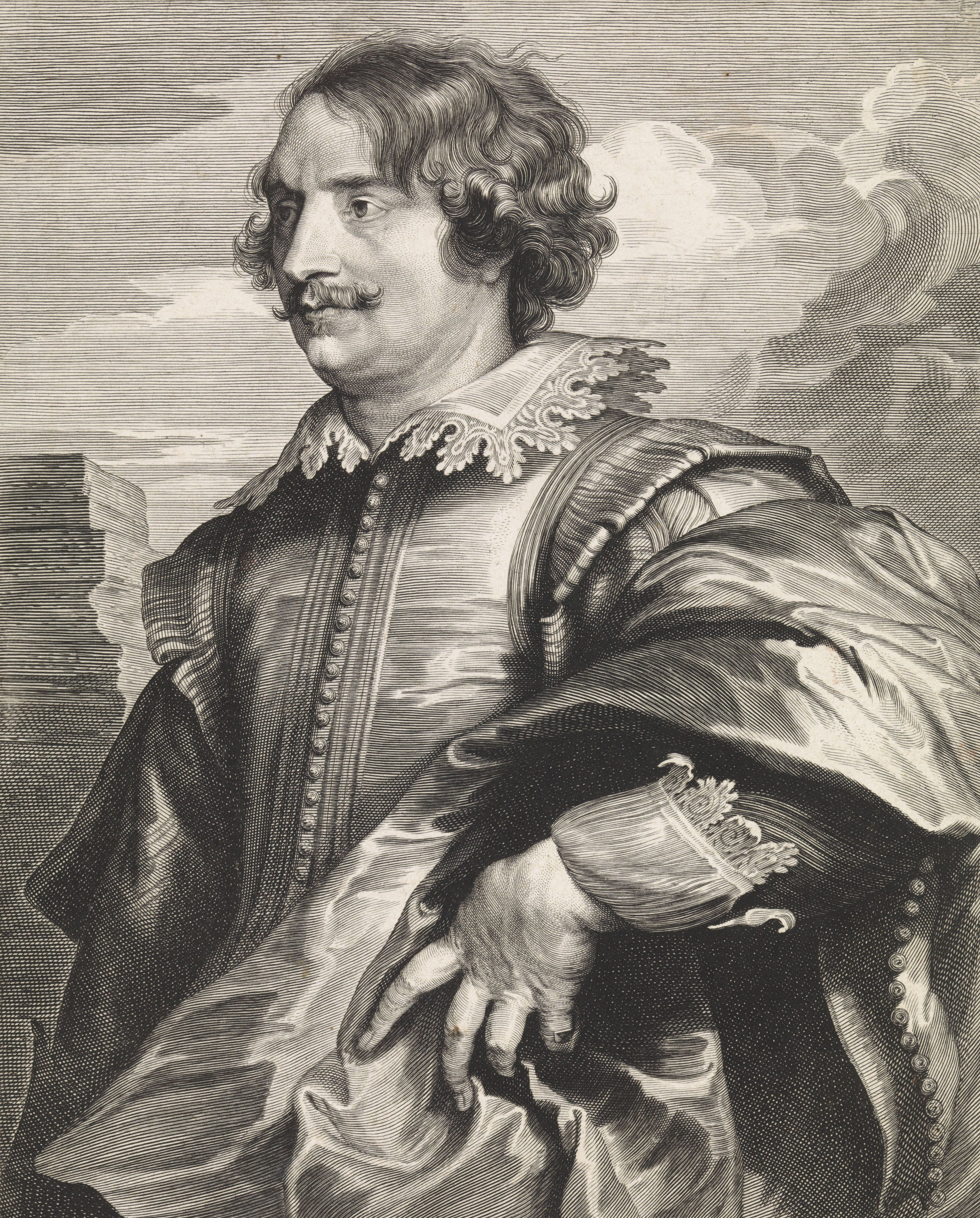
- Paul Pontius by Anthony van Dyck
- Born: 27 May 1603; Antwerp, Brabant, Spain
- Died: 16 January 1658 (aged 54), Antwerp; Antwerp, Brabant, Spain
- Known for: Engraving

Paulus Pontius (27 May 1603 – 16 January 1658) was a Flemish engraver and painter. He was one of the leading engravers connected with the workshop of Peter Paul Rubens. After Rubens' death, Pontius worked with other leading Antwerp painters such as Anthony van Dyck and Jacob Jordaens.

== Life ==
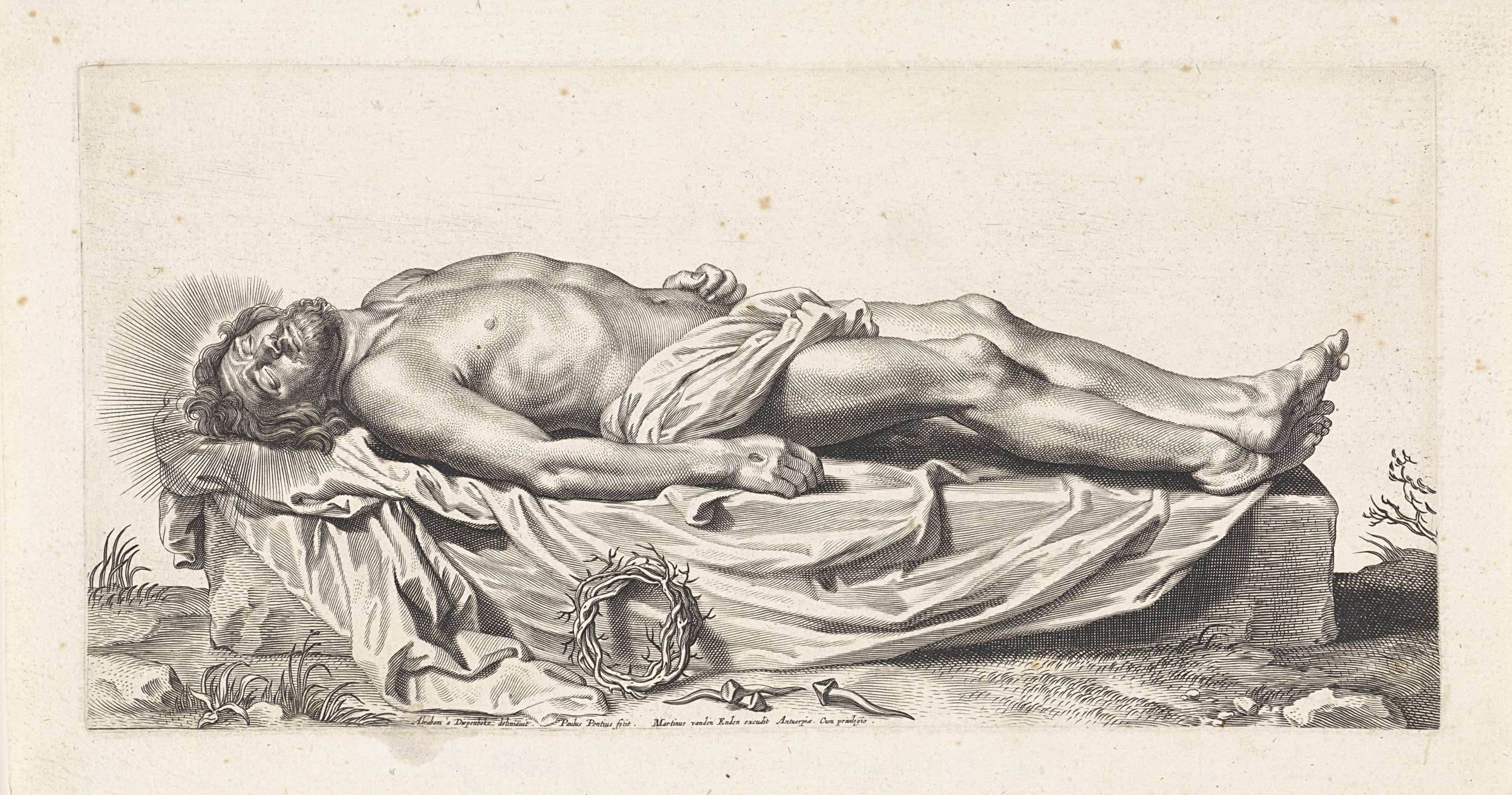
Body of the dead Christ, after Titian

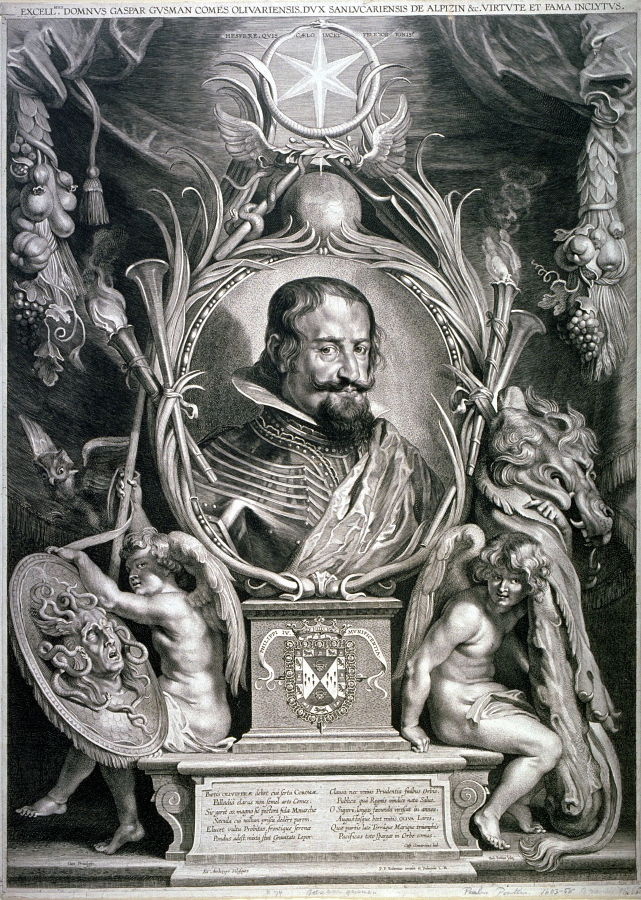
Gaspar de Gusman, Count of Olivares, after Rubens and Velázquez

Paulus Pontius was born in Antwerp where he was apprenticed to the still life painter Osias Beert on 3 December 1616. He later worked under the prominent engraver Lucas Vorsterman who taught him the art of engraving. Vorsterman had joined Rubens' workshop around 1617 or 1618 and had established himself as Rubens' primary engraver since. In 1626–1627 Pontius was admitted as a master in the Antwerp Guild of Saint Luke.

Together with Vorsterman, Schelte a Bolswert and Boetius à Bolswert, Pontius became one of the leading engravers of the first generation who made reproductions after Rubens' works. When Vorsterman left for England in 1624 after he had a conflict with Rubens, Pontius took over from Vorsterman as Rubens' foremost engraver. He even took up lodgings in Rubens' house from 1624 to 1631.

Pontius married three times. The names of his successive wives were: Christina Herselin, Catlyne van Eck and Helena Schryvers. He had respectively one son, two sons and three daughters, and one daughter with his spouses. His son François was an engraver and art dealer.

By 1634, Pontius was living with his first wife Christina Herselin in the Everdijstraat in the house of his father-in-law. On 26 April 1634, the famous but impoverished genre painter Adriaen Brouwer took up lodgings in his house as the two men were close friends. The same year the pair joined the local chamber of rhetoric Violieren. It has been suggested that Brouwer's painting called Fat man or Luxuria (Mauritshuis), which possibly represents the deadly sin of lust, is at the same time a portrait of Paulus Pontius.

After Rubens' death in 1640, Pontius created reproductions after the work of, amongst others, Rubens, Anthony van Dyck, Jacob Jordaens, Pieter van Avont, Abraham van Diepenbeeck, Anselm van Hulle, Gerard Seghers, Gaspar de Crayer, Gonzales Coques, Frans Luycx and Titian.

His pupils included Alexander Voet the Younger, Coenraet Waumans and Frans van den Wyngaerde.

== Work ==
Pontius was able to develop early in his career a personal style characterized by precise drawing that renders the original painting accurately. He was a master in suggesting the effects of light and the colours in a very subtle manner. Pontius worked as one of the principal engravers for Rubens' workshop. Pontius also worked after the work of pupils or imitators of Rubens. He can be regarded as one of the principal engravers of van Dyck's work.

Altogether Pontius produced 42 plates after Rubens. As several of these works were portraits of the rulers of the Spanish Netherlands such as the king and queen of Spain and the governors and ministers of the Spanish Netherlands, Pontius can be seen as the official portrait engraver. An example is the Portrait of Gaspar de Gusman, Count of Olivares, which Pontius made in 1626 after a design by Rubens. This was one of his first important portrait commissions and the success of the print led to many more official commissions.

In his portraits Pontius conveyed the figures and their expressions in an attractive and faultless manner. This quality of his work made him one of the most sought after engravers for the various publication projects of the prominent portrait painters active in Flanders at the time. He made many of the portrait engravings that were published in van Dyck's Iconography (Antwerp, c. 1632–1644), Johannes Meyssens' Images de divers hommes, Cornelis de Bie's Het Gulden Cabinet (Antwerp, 1661) and Anselm van Hulle's Icones legatorum (Antwerp, 1648).

== Principal works ==
=== Portraits after Van Dyck ===
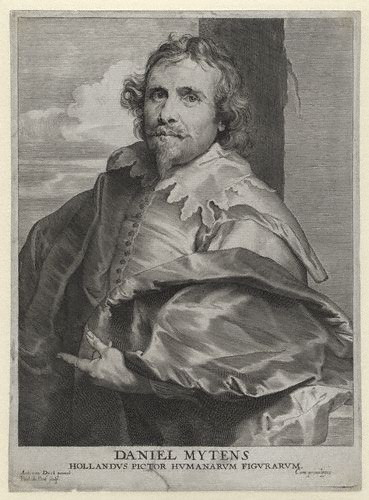
Daniël Mijtens, after van Dyck

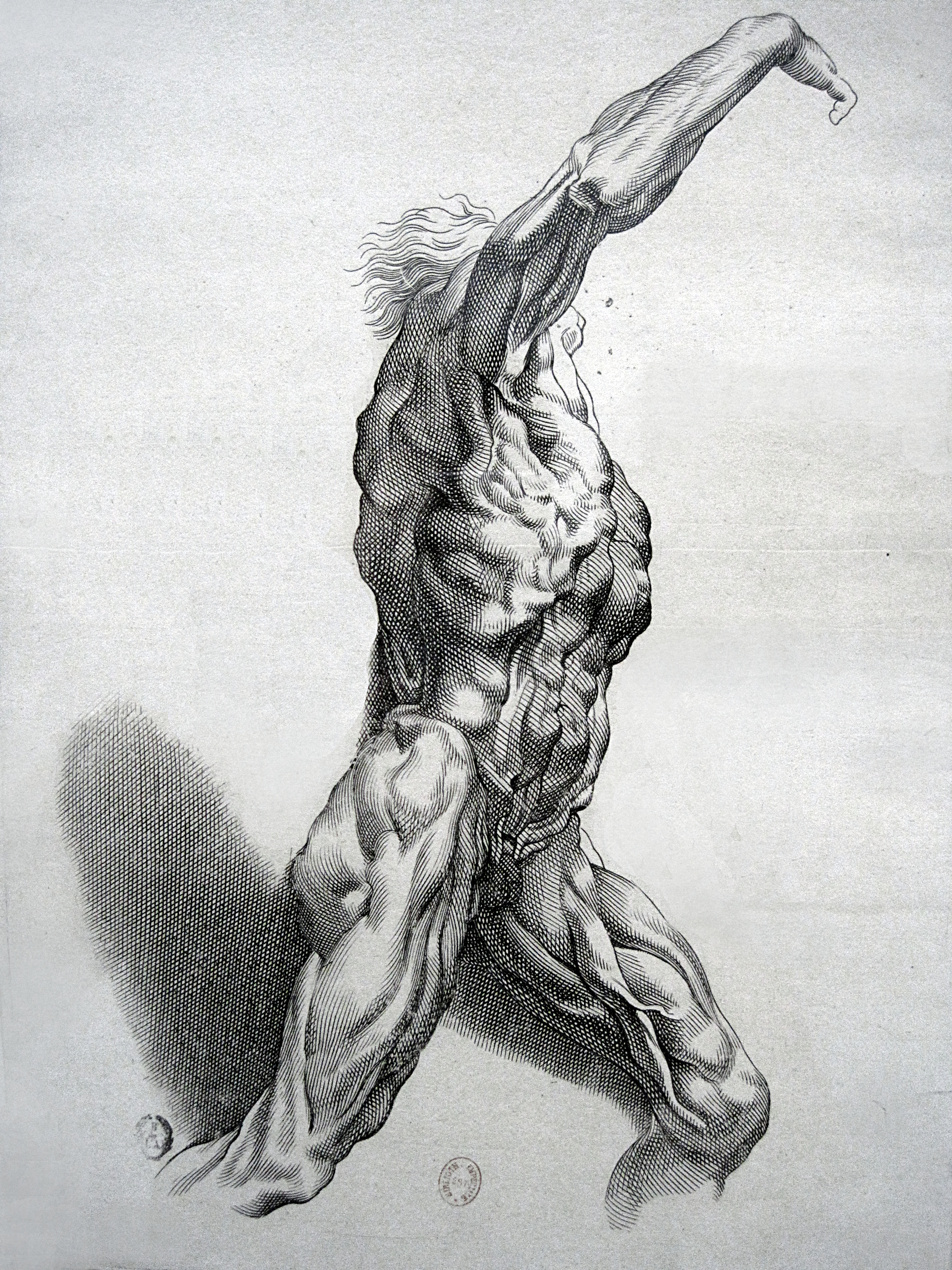
Écorché, after Rubens

- Paulus Du Pont, or Pontius, engraver;
- Peter Paul Rubens;
- Jacob De Breuck, architect;
- Jan Wildens, painter of Antwerp;
- Jan van Ravesteyn, painter of the Hague;
- Palamedes Palamedesz. (I), Dutch painter;
- Theodoor van Loon, painter of Louvain;
- Theodoor Rombouts, painter of Antwerp;
- Cornelis van der Geest, celebrated connoisseur;
- Gerard Honthorst, painter of the Hague;
- Hendrik van Balen, painter of Antwerp;
- Adriaen Stalbent, painter of Antwerp;
- Daniel Mytens, painter of Holland;
- Gerard Seghers, painter of Antwerp;
- Simon De Vos, painter of Antwerp;
- Gaspar De Craeyer, painter of Ghent;
- Hendrik Steenwyck, painter of Antwerp;
- Gaspar Gevartius, jurisconsult of Antwerp;
- Nicolaas Rockox, magistrate of Antwerp;
- Jan van den Wouwer, Counsellor of State;
- Caesar Alexander Scaglia, Abbot of Stophard;
- Gustavus Adolphus, King of Sweden;
- Mary de' Medici, Queen of France.
- Francis Thomas, of Savoy, Prince of Carignan.
- John, Count of Nassau;
- Don Alvarez, Marquis of Santa Cruz;
- Don Carlos de Colonna, Spanish General;
- Don Diego Felipe de Guzman, Marquis de Leganez;
- Mary, Princess of Aremberg;
- Henry, Count de Berghe, in armour;
- Sir Balthazar Gerbier;
- Frederick Henry, Prince of Orange.

=== Portraits after Rubens ===
- Philip IV, King of Spain, 1632;
- Elizabeth of Bourbon, his Queen;
- Isabella Clara Eugenia, infanta of Spain;
- Ferdinand, Infant of Spain, on horseback;
- Gasparo Guzman, Duke of Olivarez;
- Cristoval, Marquis of Castel Rodrigo;
- Manuel de Moura Cortereal, Marquis of Castel Rodrigo;
- The Mother of Manuel, Marquis of Castel Rodrigo.

=== Various subjects after Rubens ===
- Susannah and the Elders, 1624;
- The Adoration of the Shepherds;
- The Murder of the Innocents. In two sheets, 1643;
- The Presentation in the Temple;
- Christ bearing His Cross;
- The Crucifixion, with Angels, one of whom is overcoming Sin and Death;
- The Dead Christ supported by the Virgin, with Mary Magdalen, St. Francis, and other figures;
- The Descent of the Holy Ghost;
- The Assumption of the Virgin;
- The Virgin suckling the Infant Christ;
- St. Roch interceding with Christ for the Plague-stricken;
- Thomyris causing the Head of Cyrus to be put into a Vessel of Blood.

=== Subjects after various masters ===
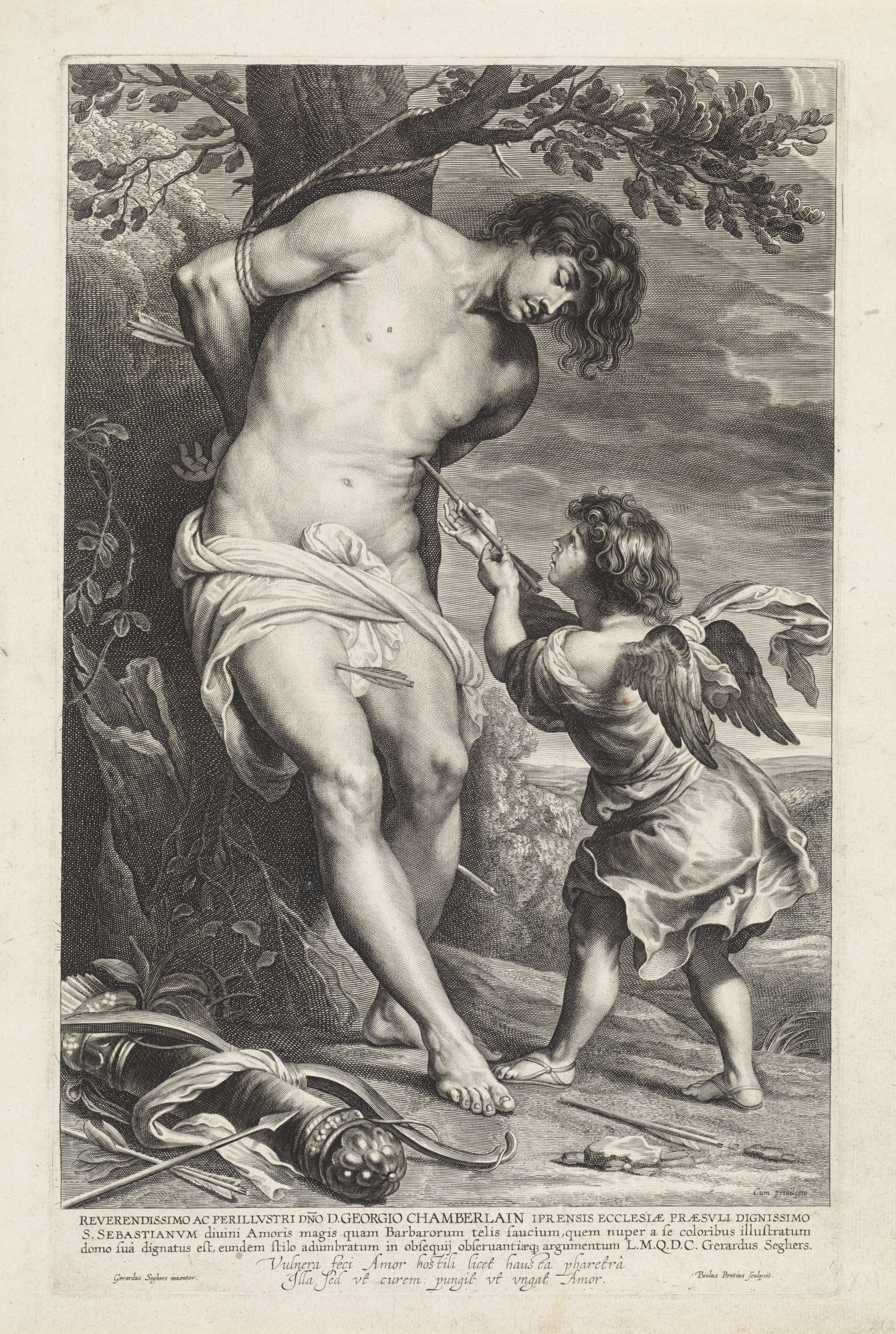
St. Sebastian, after Gerard Seghers

- The Flight into Egypt, after Jacob Jordaens;
- Twelfth-Night, after Jacob Jordaens;
- The Adoration of the Magi, after Gerard Seghers;
- The Virgin with the Infant Christ and St. Anne, after Gerard Seghers;
- St. Francis Xavier kneeling before the Virgin and Child, after Gerard Seghers;
- St. Sebastian, with an Angel drawing an Arrow from his breast, after Gerard Seghers;
- A Dead Christ, supported by the Virgin, after van Dyck;
- St. Rosalia, receiving a Crown from the Infant Jesus, after van Dyck;
- The Holy Family, after Jan van den Hoecke;
- The Body of the Dead Christ, after Titian.
