= Sebastian Castro (painter) =

Flemish painter

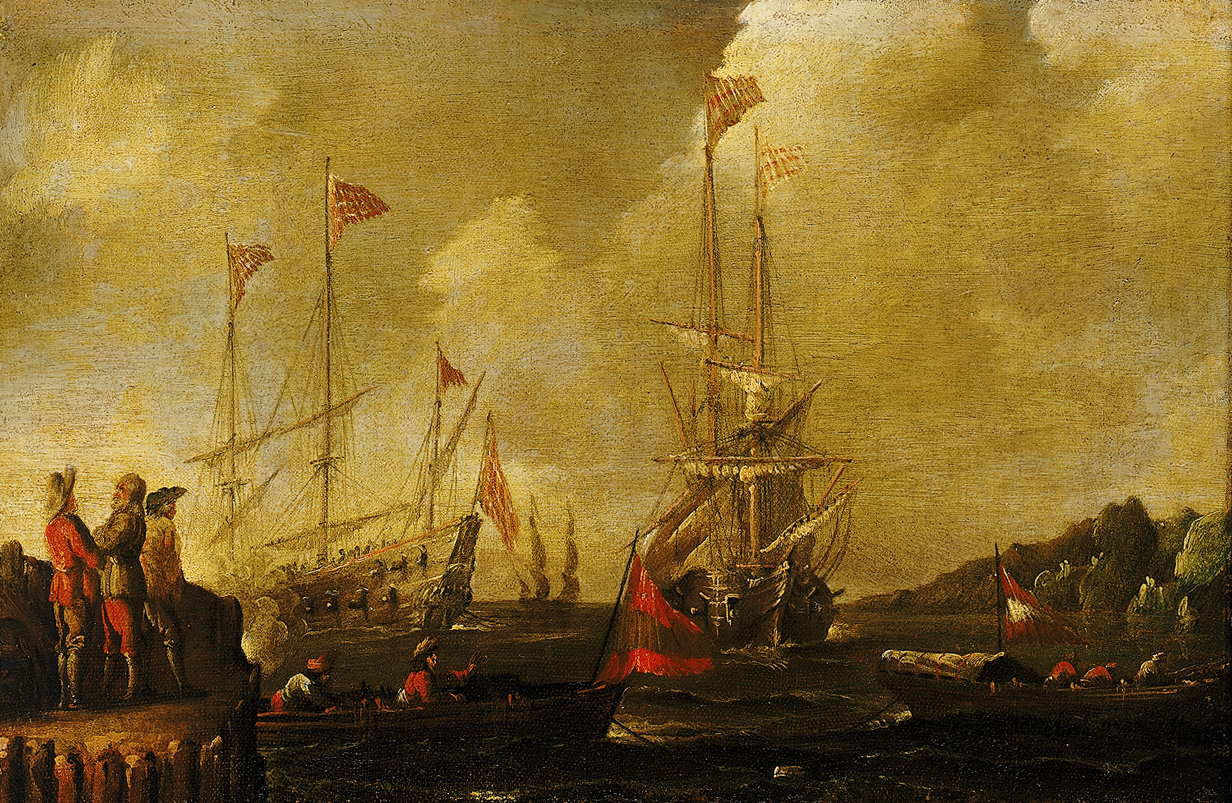
Spanish Ships Approaching a Jetty

Sebastiaen Castro or Sebastian a Castro, in English sources also referred to as Sebastian Castro or Sebastianus a Castro was a Flemish painter specialized in marine painting who was active in Antwerp between 1633 and 1656.

== Life ==
Very few details about Sebastian Castro's life and training are known. It has been speculated that he was of Portuguese descent and a member of a family, which had escaped the persecution of Jews during the Portuguese Inquisition of the early 1600s. He may have trained under Andries van Eertvelt, the leading Flemish marine painter of the first half of the 17th century but there is no evidence of this.

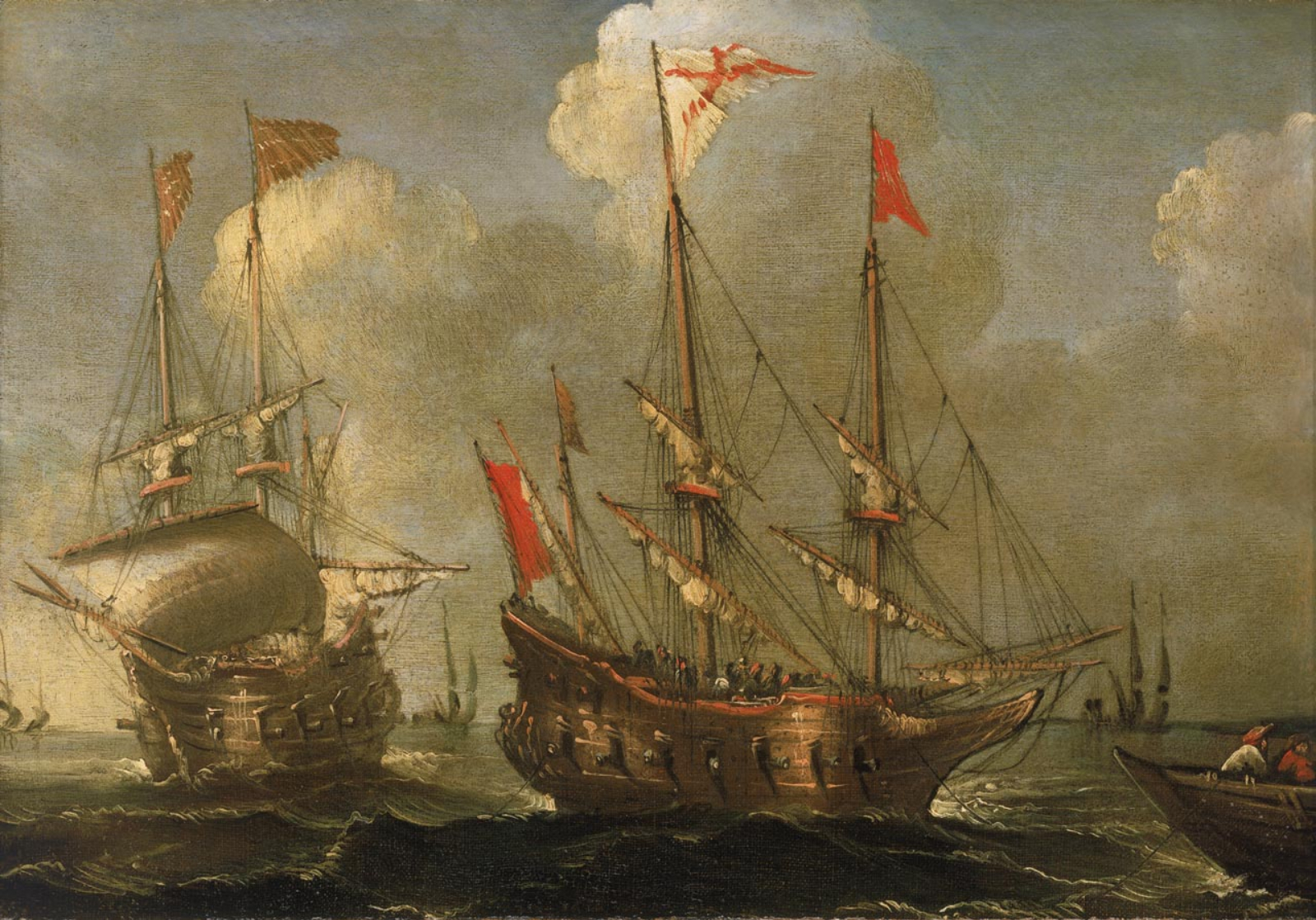
Spanish Ships at Anchor

Castro is first recorded as a master painter in the Antwerp Guild of Saint Luke in the guild year 1633–34. In 1656 he was still in Antwerp when he was registered as present at the distribution of the moveable assets of the father of the painters Gaspar van Eyck and Nicolaes van Eyck.

He married Anna van Beneden in Antwerp on 9 January 1636. After the death of his wife, he married Anna Wuijlens (died c. 1660) in Antwerp on 20 October 1643. The couple is believed to be the parents of Laureys a Castro (also known as Laureys Castro, Laureys A. Castro or Lorenzo A. Castro) (1644–1700), a marine painter who became a master in the Antwerp Guild of Saint Luke in 1664-65 and was later active in England. If the speculation on the Jewish roots of the family is correct, the family must have converted to Catholicism as the newborn Laureys was baptized in the Saint George parish of Antwerp on 20 March 1644.

== Work ==
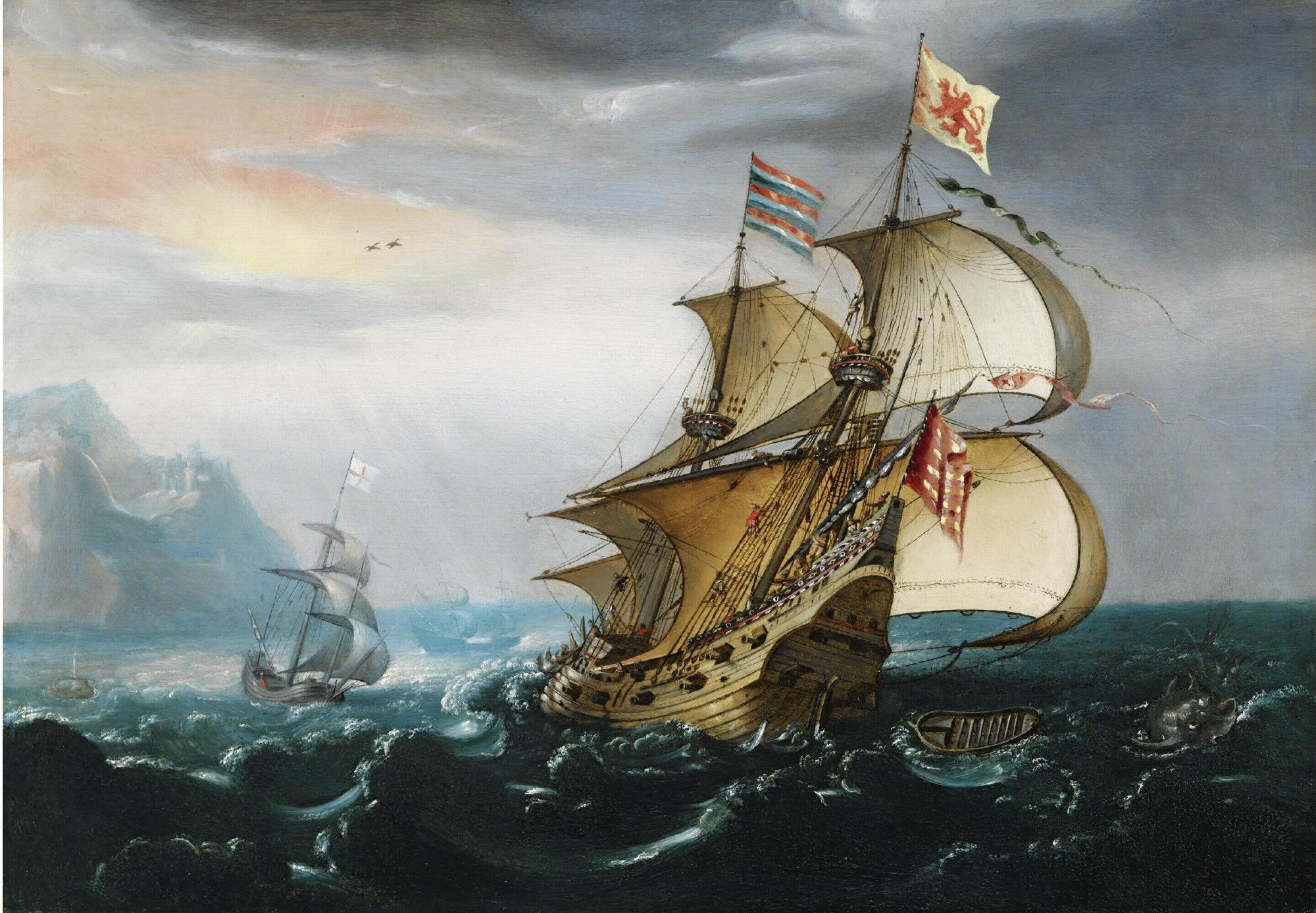
Dutch Merchant Vessel in Choppy Waters near a Rocky Coast

Castro was active in Antwerp as a marine painter. The few works by his hand that are currently known cover the range of subjects typical for marine painters in the 17th century such as sailing ships, port scenes and naval battles. These works show an influence by the Dutch development towards tonal painting while retaining typically Flemish stylistic elements. This is demonstrated in the Spanish Ships at Anchor (National Maritime Museum, Greenwich) which through the tonality of its color scheme, low horizon and build-up of clouds in the background reveals a Dutch influence while its more theatrical lighting and schematic depiction of the ships reflect typically 'Flemish' stylistic traits.

His composition Spanish Ships Approaching a Jetty (National Maritime Museum, Greenwich) shows a similar tonality of colour and a low perspective. The painting testifies to Castro's skill in depicting figures and boats in a landscape setting without sacrificing an overall painterly effect. The brushwork of the work is open and fluid.
