= Jan van Essen =

Flemish painter

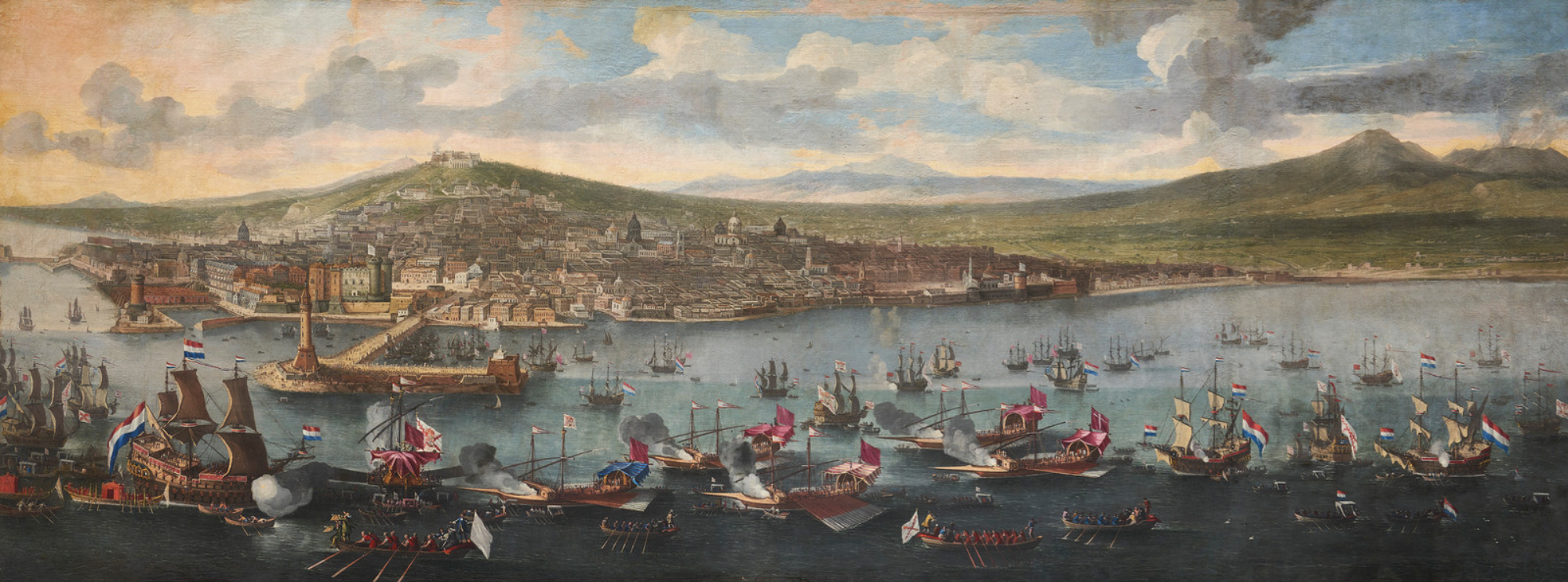
View of the port of Naples with a review of the fleet commanded by Michiel de Ruyter

Jan van Essen (c. 1640 in Antwerp – 1684 in Naples), was a Flemish painter known for his seascapes. After training in Antwerp, he worked in the Papal States and the Kingdom of Naples.

== Life ==
A pupil of Sebastiaen de Bruyn in Antwerp in 1659, Jan van Essen spent time in Turkey between 1665 and 1669 with the Flemish battle painter Pieter Hofman. He then went to Rome in Italy. He could be identical with Giovanni Vanes, a Flemish painter whose presence in Rome is recorded in September 1669.

In Rome he joined the association of mainly Flemish and Dutch painters called the 'Bentvueghels' (shortened as the 'bent'). The Bentvueghels admitted new members in a ceremony in which they were given a nickname, the so-called 'bent name'. Van Essen's bent name was 'Santruyter' or 'Zandruiter' (Horseman on the sand). He was present at a dispute in Rome on 30 September 1669 or around 1670 and attended a farewell dinner in Rome organised by the Bentvueghels for the Flemish engraver Albertus Clouwet.

He remained in Italy and died in 1684 during a stay in Naples.

== Work ==
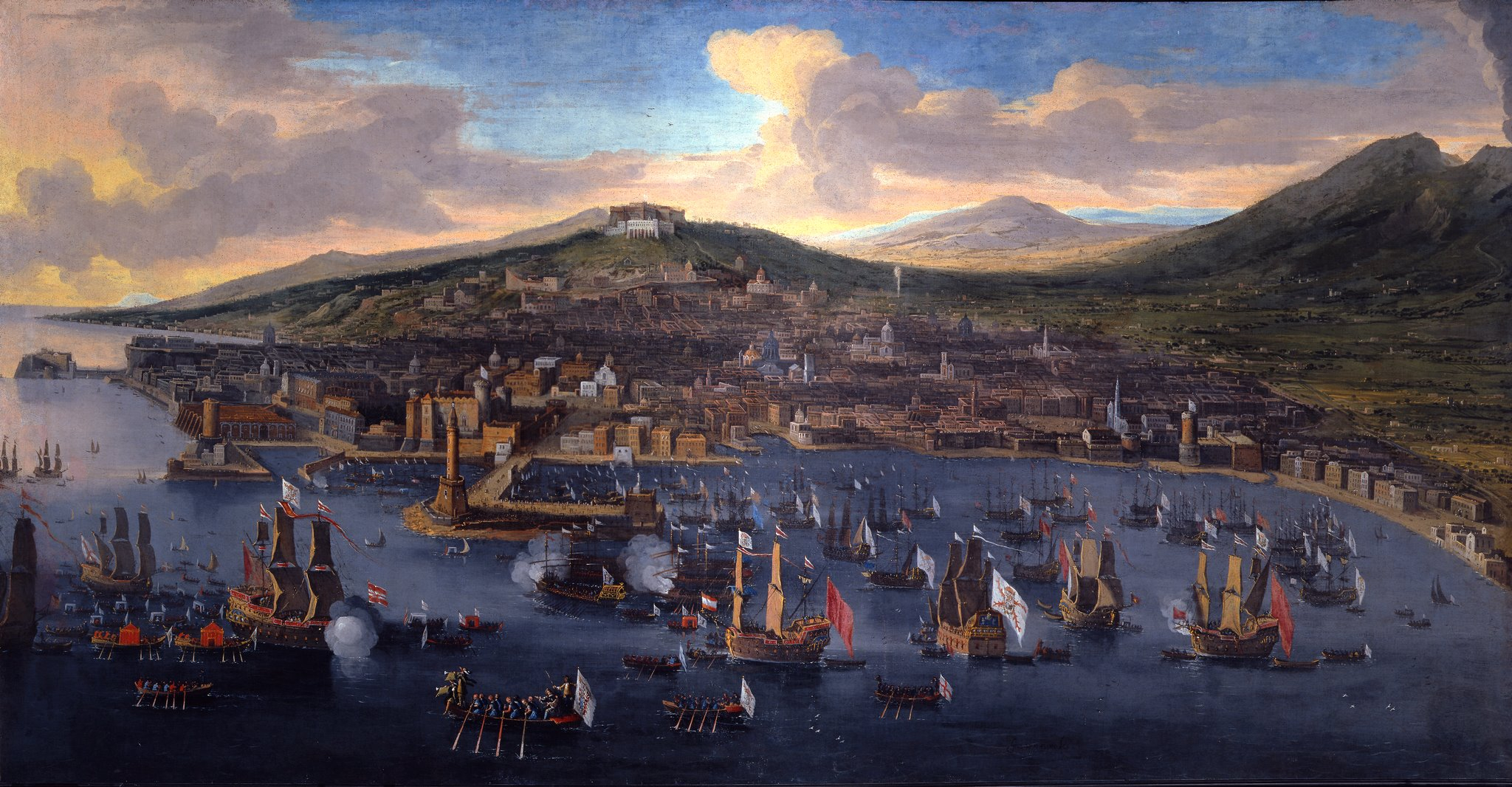
Naval parade in the Bay of Naples

Jan van Essen is known for his topographical views and landscape paintings.Three of his known works depict vedute of the port of Naples. Two of these works are in the collections of respectively the Museo Nazionale di San Martino in Naples and the Brukenthal National Museum in Sibiu, Romania. The third is in a private collection in Spain and depicts the port of Naples with the review of the fleet led by Dutch admiral Michiel de Ruyter. Michiel de Ruyter was commander of a Dutch-Spanish fleet defending the Kingdom of Naples against French attacks. The painting shows the Viceroy of Naples paying tribute to de Ruyter's fleet after it repulsed an initial attack at the Battle of Stromboli.

The veduta in the collection of the Museo Nazionale di San Martino entitled Naval parade in the Bay of Naples is signed "signed Gio . van Essen fecit". Painted around 1650, it was the first painting to depict the port of Naples from the sea. The viewpoint is elevated and directed towards the San Vincenzo pier. Van Essen incorrectly placed Mount Vesuvius on the west side. The painting in the Brukenthal National Museum is more rudimentary with a viewpoint directly towards the San Vincenzo pier. It depicts Mount Vesuvius in the correct location.

He also painted vedute of Messina and Rome.
