= Laureys a Castro =

Flemish painter

- Born: March 1644; Antwerp, Spanish Netherlands
- Died: c. 1700; Likely in England

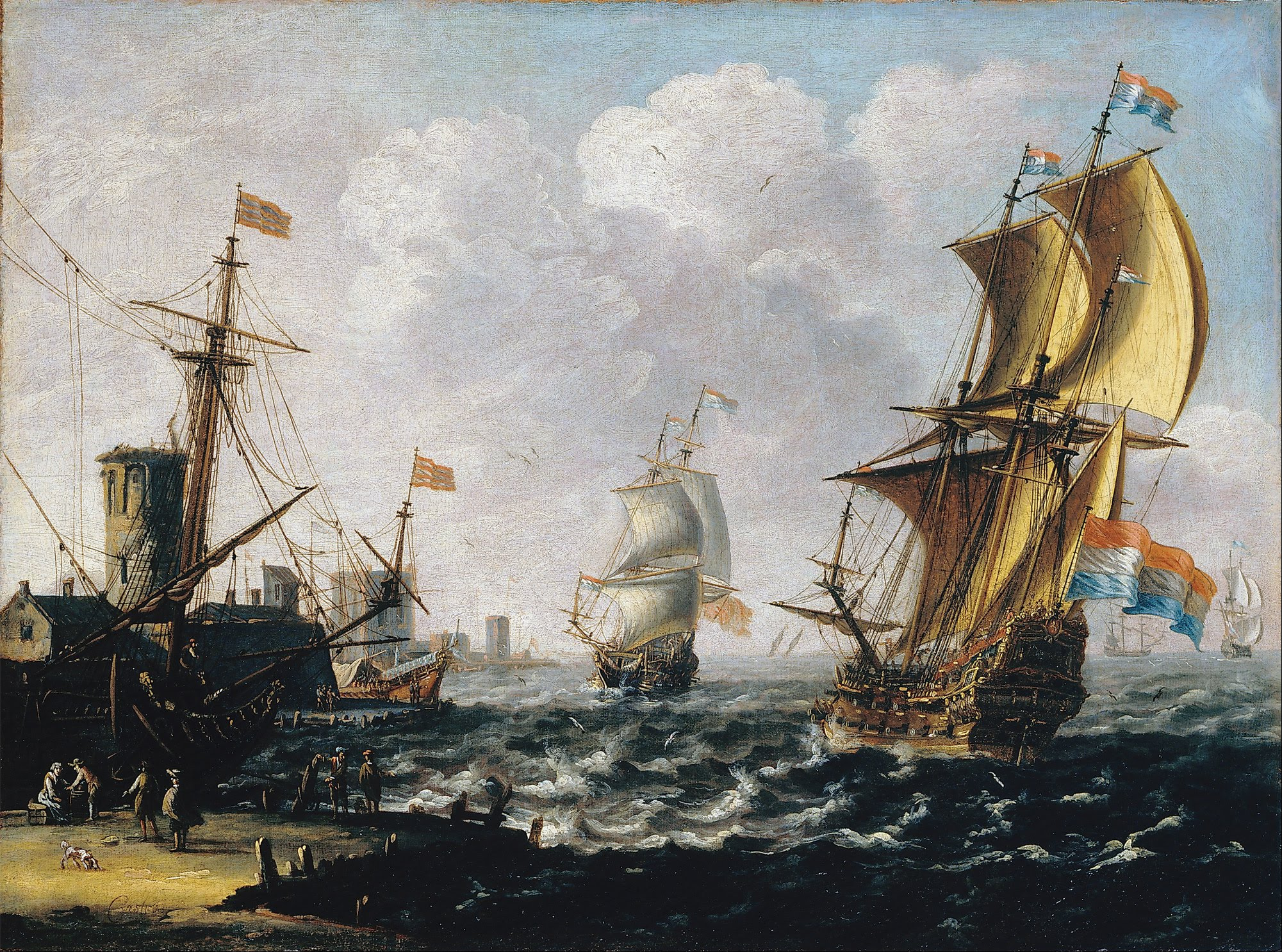
Dutch Levanters in a Rough Sea

Laureys a Castro or Lorenzo a Castro (March 1644 – c. 1700) was a Flemish painter of marine views and portraits who is mainly known for his work carried out in England roughly between 1672 and 1700. He was clearly regarded as a leading marine painter in England as many of his works were held in English collections.

== Life ==
Very few details about Laureys a Castro's life and training have been transmitted. It has been speculated that he was the son of the Flemish marine painter Sebastiaen Castro and his second wife Anna Wuijlens and that his family was of Portuguese descent and had settled in Antwerp to escape the persecution of Jews during the Portuguese Inquisition of the early 1600s. If the speculation on the Jewish roots of the family is correct, the family must have converted to Catholicism as Laureys was baptized in the Saint George parish of Antwerp on 20 March 1644.

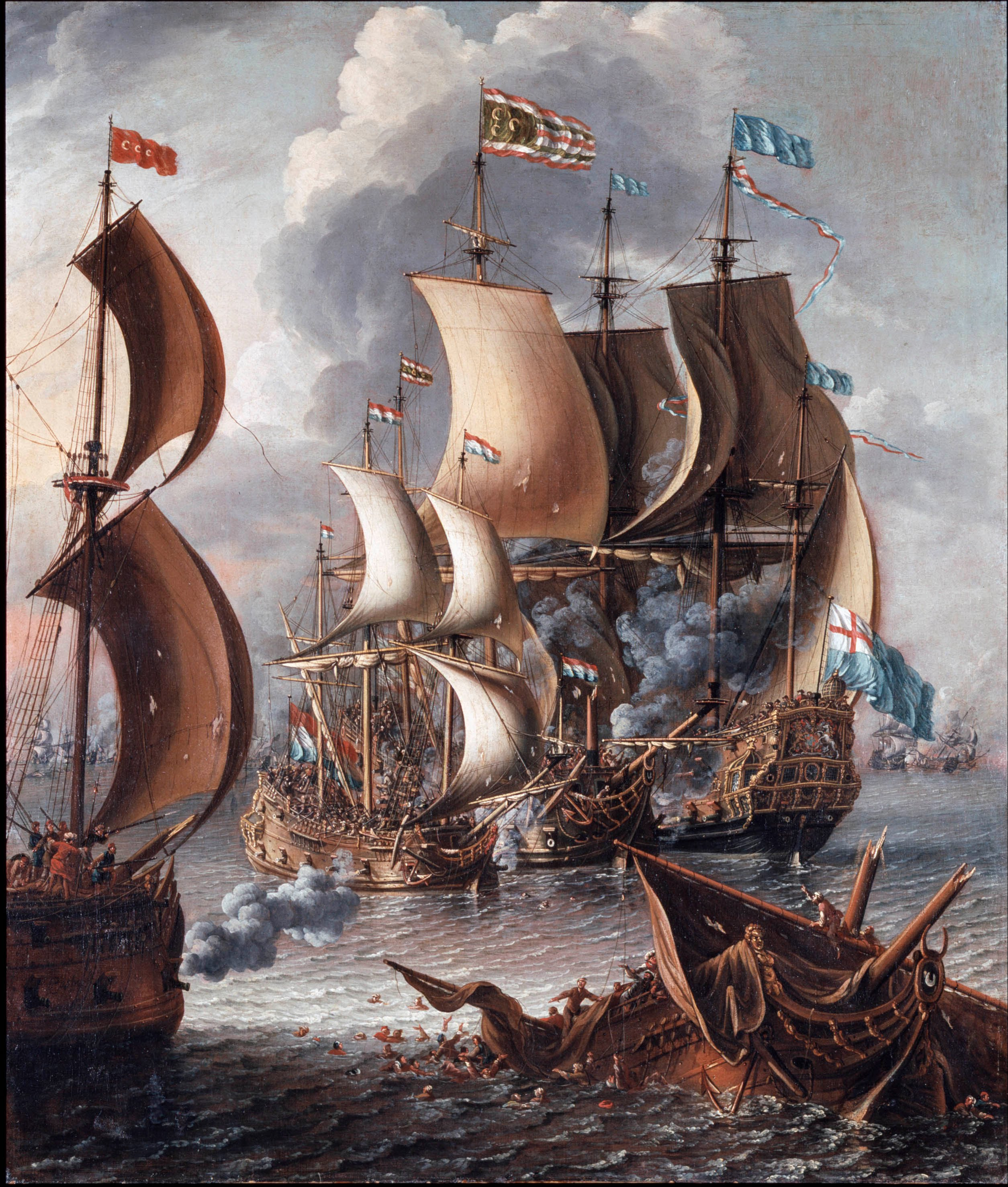
Sea battle with Barbary Corsairs

It is assumed Laureys received his training from his father. Laureys was registered as master in the Antwerp Guild of Saint Luke in the guild year 1664–65 in the capacity of a 'wijnmeester', i.e. son of a master.

Based on the subjects of his paintings, he likely travelled and visited many Mediterranean ports such as Lisbon, Genoa, Malta and Sicily. Around 1670–72 he settled in England where he was active as a marine and portrait painter working principally on commission. A number of commissions were given to him circa 1670, notably six pictures for the actor-manager William Cartwright. These pictures were among Cartwright's collection which he bequeathed to Dulwich College on his death in 1686. These works formed the nucleus of the Dulwich Picture Gallery, England's first public art gallery-museum. The picture Dutch Levanters in a Rough Sea is one of Castro's pictures that has remained in the collection of the Dulwich Picture Gallery.

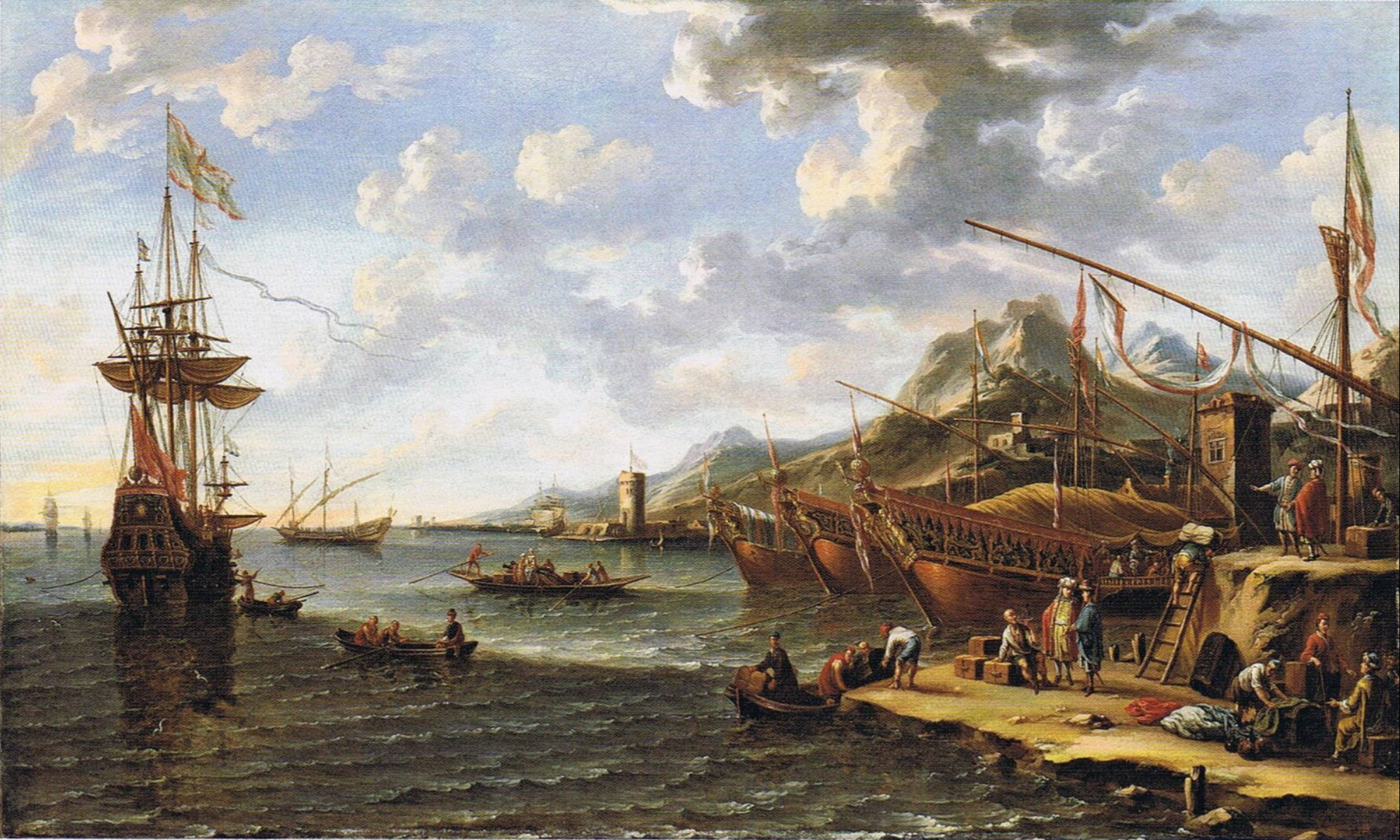
Mediterranean port with Turks and Orientals bringing goods ashore

It is not known when or where he died. No paintings are attributed to him after the end of the 17th century. A record of 1695 of "Lawrence Castro" in Whitecross Street, London and various works by an artist of that name in English collections suggest that Castro was at that time still working in England.

== Work ==
Castro's period of activity is variously given as 1664 to 1700 and 1672 to 1686. The latter, shorter period is based on the known dated paintings of Castro. While Castro is mainly known for his marine paintings, he also painted portraits, religious subjects and likely genre scenes. Many of his works are held in English private and public collections, in particular in the Dulwich Picture Gallery, which holds about seven works and the National Maritime Museum, which holds three works.

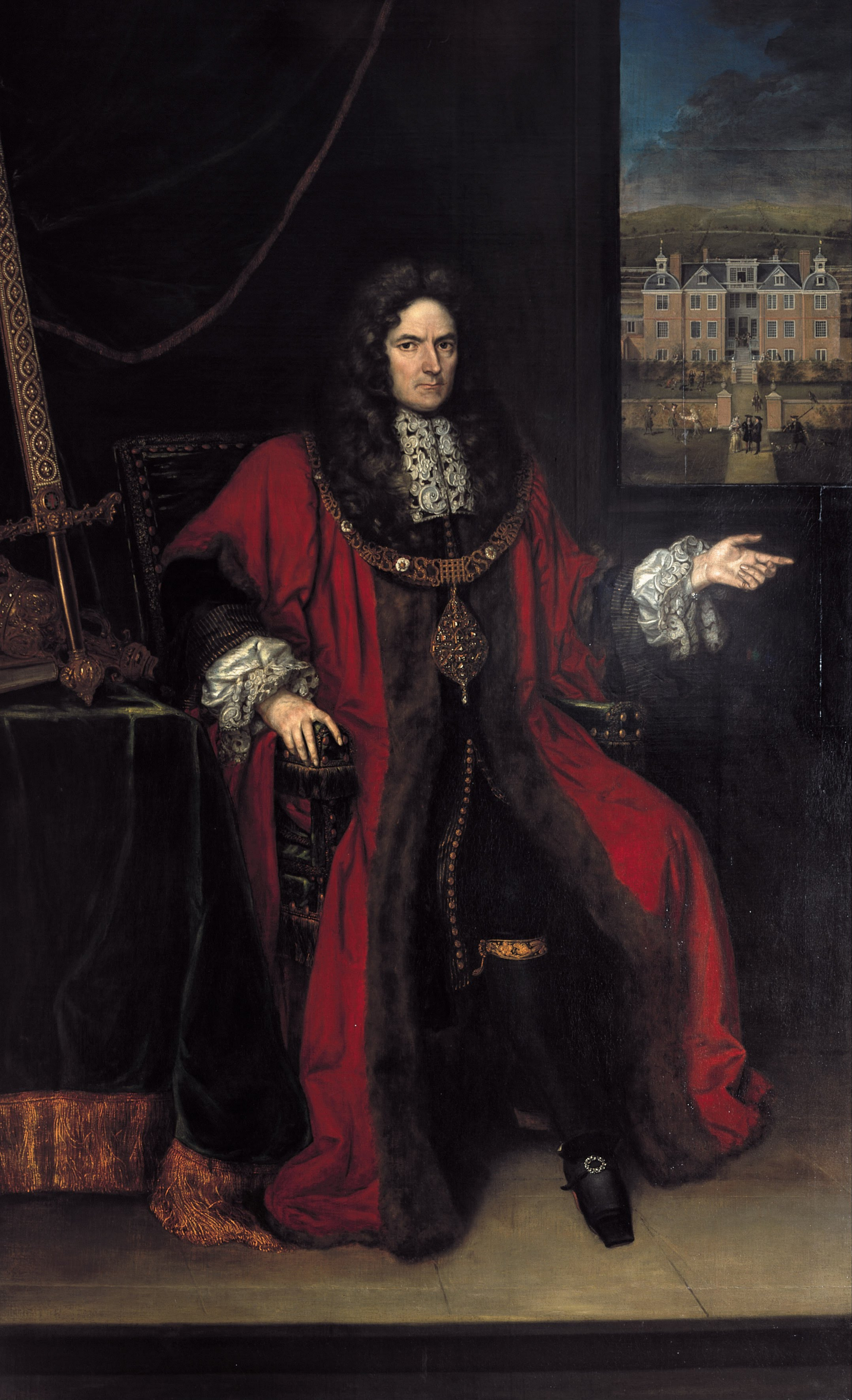
Portrait of Sir Robert Clayton

His marine paintings cover the whole range of subjects typical for marine painters in the 17th century such as sailing ships and galleys at sea, port scenes, Mediterranean port capricci, ships in distress, storms at sea and naval battles. These compositions show him to be steeped in Flemish and Dutch traditions of marine painting. His seascapes evidence a vigour and vividness of colour while some of his battle scenes are surprisingly calm.

He created many renderings of naval battles and his earliest dated painting is a 1672 imaginary interpretation of the Battle of Actium (National Maritime Museum, London). He painted a panoramic view of the Battle of Lepanto (Sold at Bonhams on 8 December 2004 in London, lot 135). This painting may have been inspired by the frequently reproduced line engraving after the design of the Flemish artist Stradanus of 1590. The work, which depicts the defeat of the Turkish naval force by a European coalition in 1571, is undated but was likely painted around 1683, the year that the Turks unsuccessfully laid siege to Vienna. It is likely that the general relief after the retreat of the Turks before Vienna provided the impulse for this composition. Castro also depicted more contemporary naval engagements such as in his Sea battle with Barbary Corsairs, which gives a dramatic depiction of a close combat engagement with Barbary pirates (Dulwich Picture Gallery).

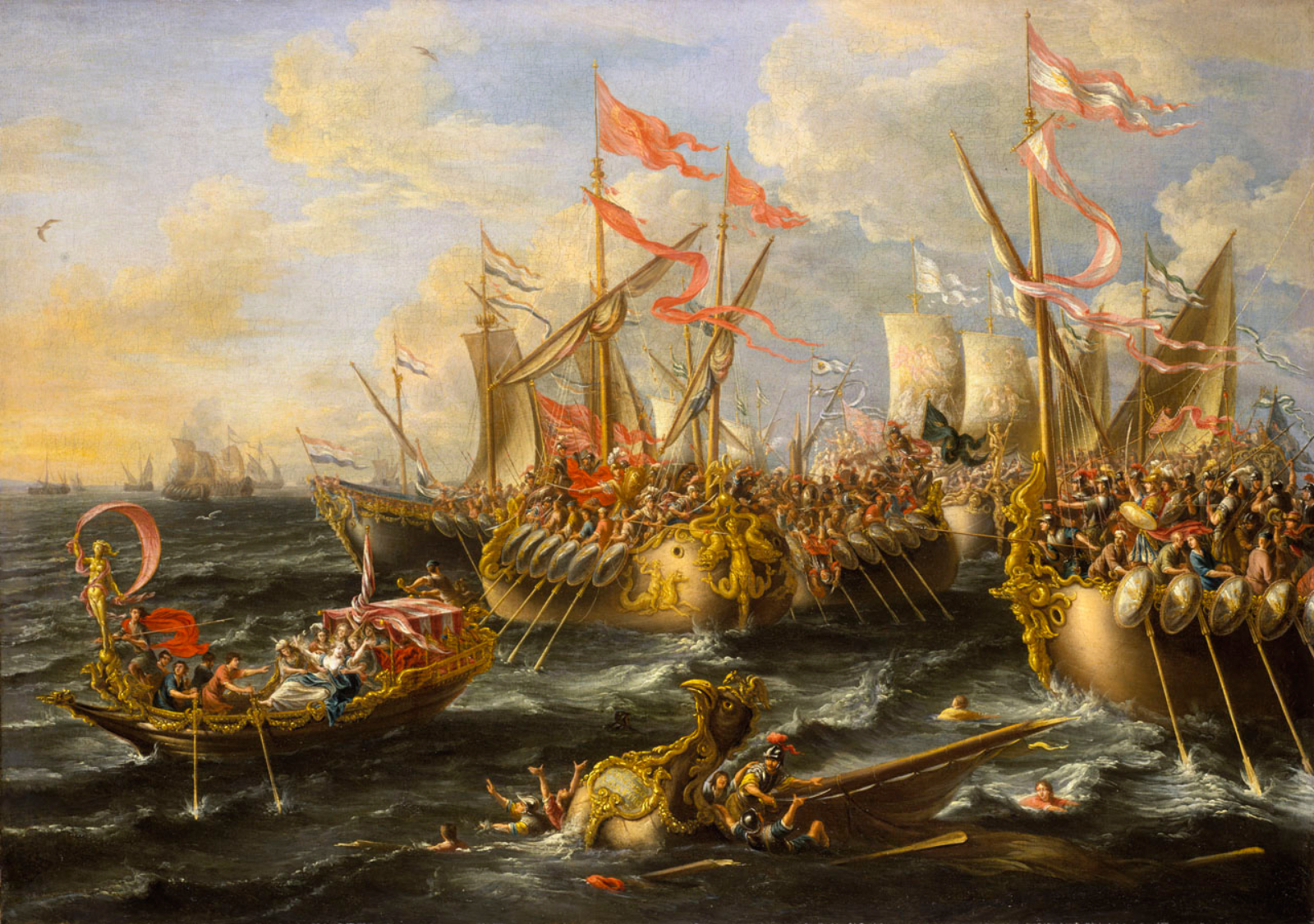
Battle of Actium

Another frequently recurring theme of his compositions are capricci of Mediterranean ports. It is likely that Castro was acquainted with Mediterranean ports such as Genoa, Malta and Lisbon. The ports depicted in these compositions are not always identifiable. A good example is the Mediterranean port with a Maltese, Spanish and a Dutch man-o'-war, which depicts a frigate sailing into a Mediterranean port where there are already a Dutch man-of-war, two or three Spanish vessels and a Maltese galley alongside the quay. The port town and the many persons onshore are painted in detail making it possible to recognize a Knight of Malta.

Castro is also believed to have painted religious paintings as indicated by a drawing of a Virgin with Child, St John the Baptist and Angels in the Museum of Fine Arts, Ghent. He was a capable portraitist as demonstrated by the Portrait of Sir Robert Clayton (1629–1707), which is a full-length portrait of Sir Robert Clayton in ceremonial robes (Bank of England collection).

Engravings made by John Smith after designs by Castro show that he may also have produced genre scenes (National Portrait Gallery, London).
