= Jan Carel van Eyck =

Flemish painter

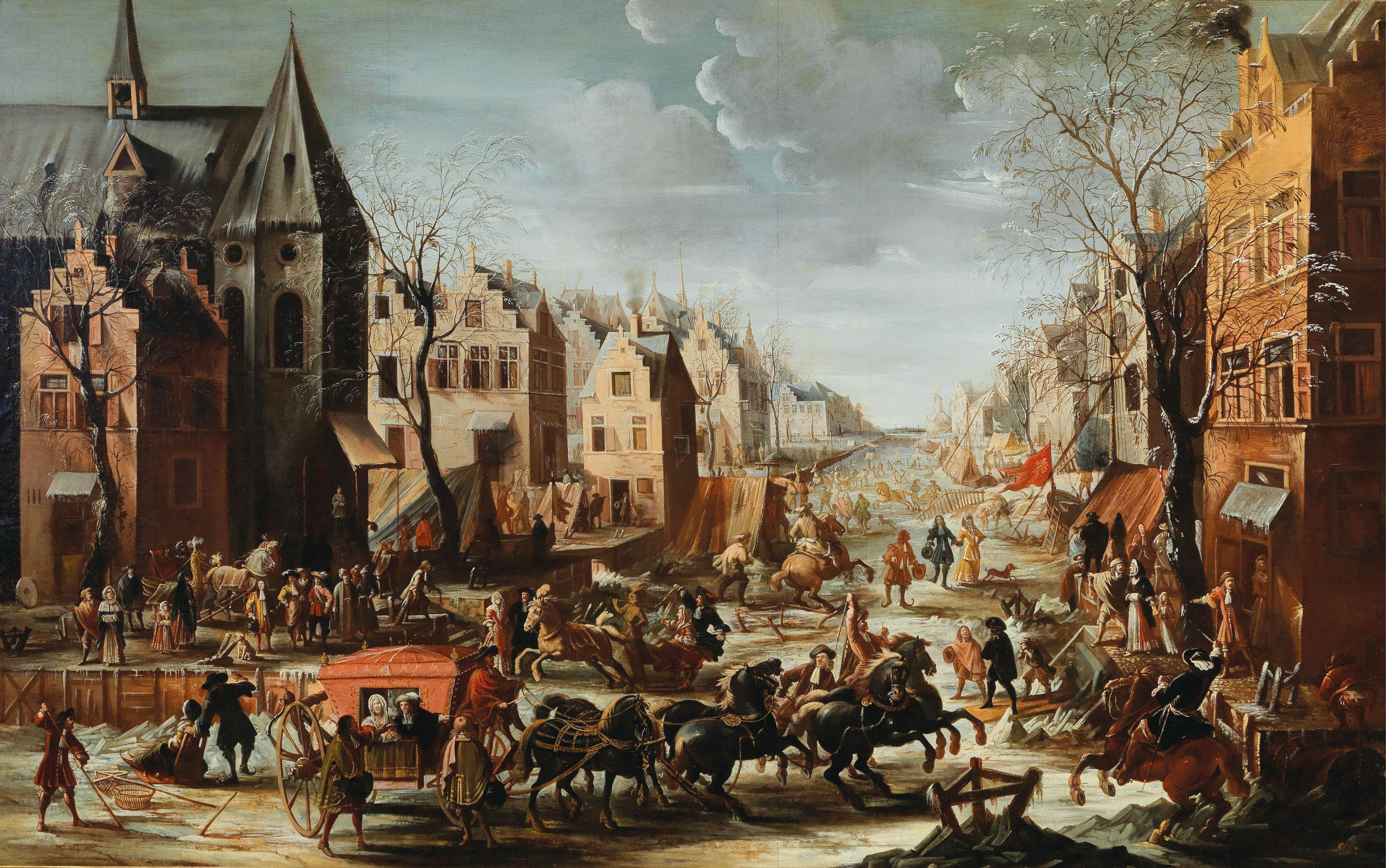
Townscape in winter with carriages

Jan Carel van Eyck or Jan Karel van Eyck (1649 in Antwerp – 1686/1706), was a Flemish painter active in Antwerp and Italy in the second half of the 17th century. He is known for his landscapes with villages and city scapes with genre scenes. He is also mentioned as a painter of portraits and biblical scenes.

== Life ==
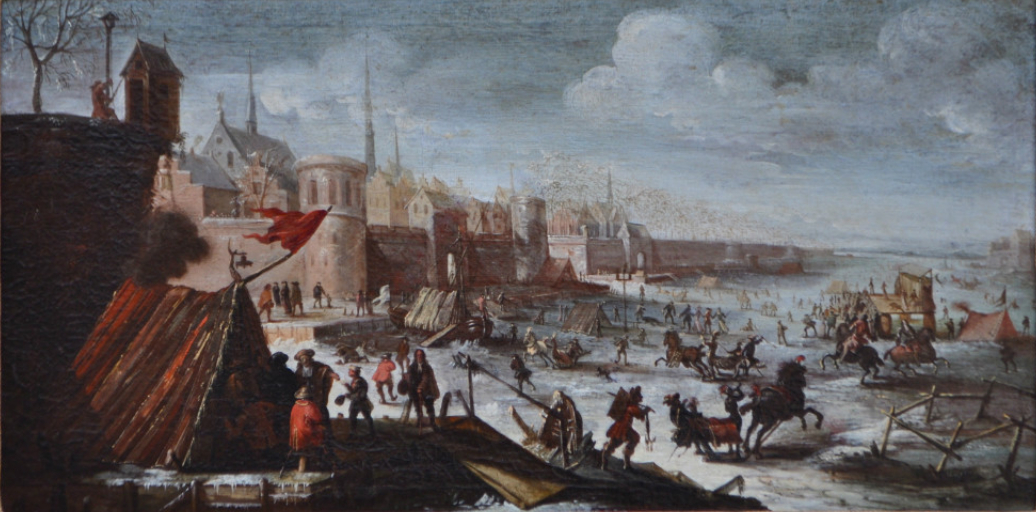
Flemish townscape with an animated frozen river

Jan Carel van Eyck was born in Antwerp as the son of the painter Nicolaas van Eyck and Dymphna Heyman. He was baptized on 12 May 1649. He had another brother called Nicolaas who became a painter but of whom no known works are known. His father was mainly a battle painter while his uncle Gaspar was a marine painter. Jan Carel's family was well-off and lived at a prestigious address on the Meir in Antwerp. His father became a captain of a local schutterij in 1658. Jan Carel was registered at Antwerp's Guild of Saint Luke as a pupil of the history painter Jan Erasmus Quellinus under whom he started to study in 1669.

There is no record that he became a master of the Guild. He travelled to Italy and his presence in Rome in 1677 is recorded. On a winter landscape noted in 1907 the signature reads 'Roma', which is further evidence that he resided in Rome.

His trace was lost in Italy and he is believed never to have returned to Antwerp. It is not clear when or where he died. It must have been after 1686 (painting from that year known) or 1692 (painting from that year mentioned, but there is no clear record for this). His death dues were never paid at the Antwerp Guild.

== Work ==
Jan Carel van Eyck is known for his landscapes with villages and cityscapes with genre scenes. He is also mentioned as a painter of portraits and biblical scenes.

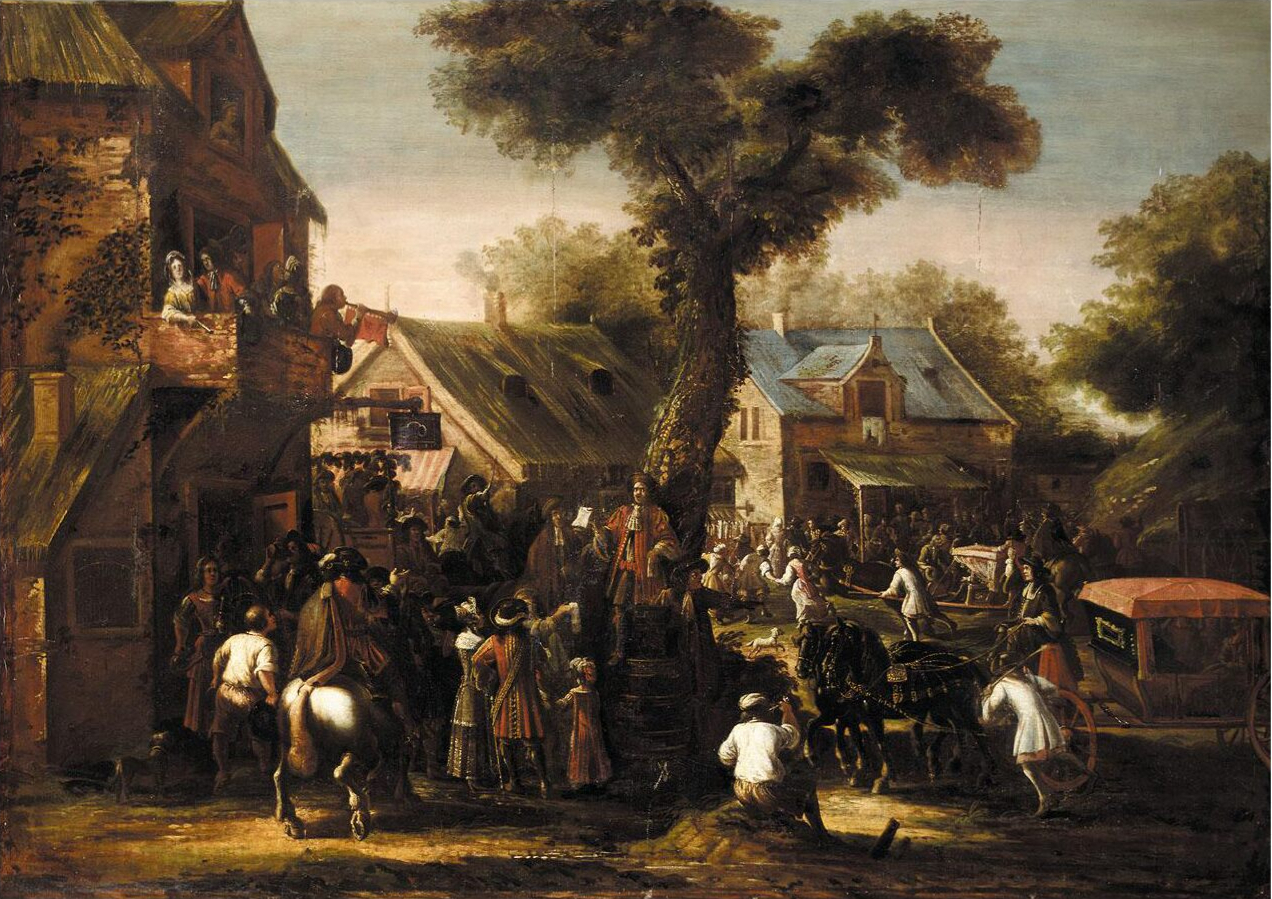
Crowded village scene with a messenger reading a proclamation

In the second half of the 17th century city views had become popular. Antwerp painters such as Erasmus de Bie specialised in the genre of city views showing genre scenes with many figures on the frozen Scheldt as in the Figures in front of the frozen Scheldt in Antwerp or public events such as The Ommegang in Antwerp. These animated scenes, particularly those of city squares populated with many characters, on foot or on horseback, were likely an inspiration for van Eyck. An example of an animated city view by van Eyck is the Townscape in winter with carriages (At Dorotheum on 30 April 2019 lot 321). It shows a large city view in winter with many figures, horses and carriages bustling about on a frozen river lined by town houses and a church. Some ships have been frozen in by the river. In the foreground is a carriage drawn by six horses which startles a horse ridden by a man. There are many figures engaged in conversations, fishing, sleighing or observing other passers-by. While the town architecture is clearly that of a 17th-century Flemish town, the persons in the scene appear to be wearing southern European and some even Oriental clothes, and some women appear to be wearing masks. In spite of the intensive activity, van Eyck achieves a balance by covering the busy street with snow, thereby adding a touch of calmness and an almost wistful atmosphere to the bustling scene.

The Prado attributes a work in its collection depicting the Fall of Phaeton to van Eyck. This is a painting from the series of paintings inspired by Ovid's Metamorphoses made by various Antwerp artists after designs by Peter Paul Rubens for the King of Spain's hunting lodge. It is clear that this work cannot have been painted by Jan Carel van Eyck since he was not even born when this series of paintings was executed in the mid-1630s. At the Netherlands Institute for Art History site the painting is attributed to an anonymous painter.
