= Pieter Hofman =

Flemish Baroque painter

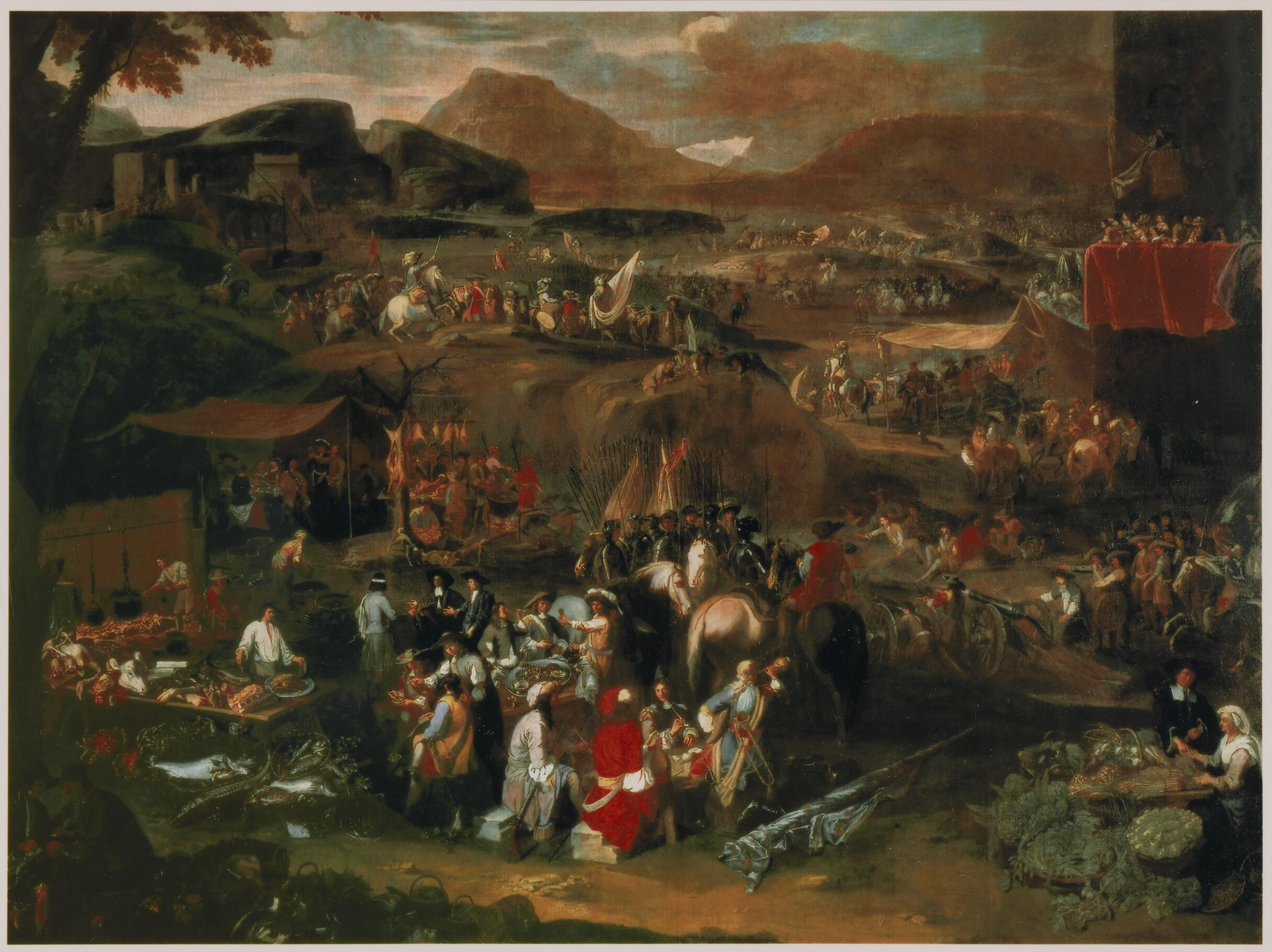
Military encampment on the Campus Martius before the Ponte Molle with Mount Soracte beyond

Pieter Hofman (c. 1642 in Antwerp – 1692 in Rome) was a Flemish Baroque painter. After training in Antwerp, he spent the rest of his career in Turkey and Italy where he painted cavalry battles and scenes from military life.

== Life ==
He was probably born around 1642 in Antwerp from a German family. He was an apprentice in 1656/57 when he was presumably around 14 or 15 years old. His master was the battle painter Nicolaas van Eyck. He traveled in the company of fellow Antwerp painter Jan van Essen to Turkey where he resided in the period 1665–1669.

He left for Rome around 1674–1675. In 1675 he is recorded in Rome where he was a pupil or worked in the workshop of the Franc-comtois-Italian battle painter Jacques Courtois according to Italian art historian Luigi Lanzi. He married Margarita Gambari in Rome on 12 September 1682. In 1688 their son was baptized in the San Lorenzo in Lucina church, with the flower painter Carel de Vogelaer acting as godfather. The family lived in Via della Croce and between 1674 and 1692 in Via Babuino.

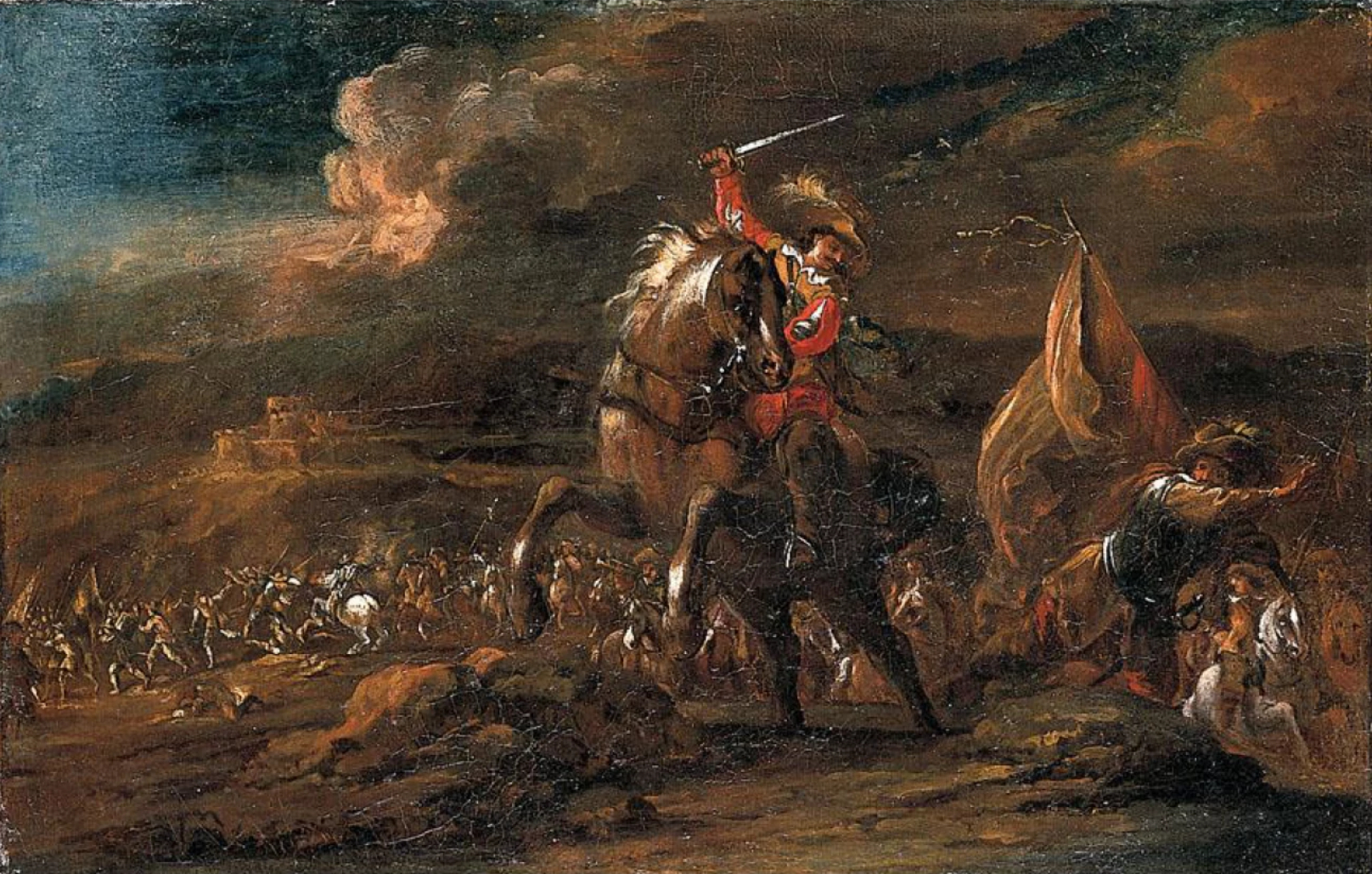
A cavalier trying to kill a standard bearer during a battle

In Rome he joined the association of mainly Flemish and Dutch painters called the 'Bentvueghels' (shortened as the 'bent'). The Bentvueghels admitted new members in a ceremony in which they were given a nickname, the so-called 'bent name'. Hofman got the bent name "Janitzer" (Janissary, a member of the elite infantry units that formed the household troops of the Ottoman Sultan). This bent name likely referenced his stay in Turkey and his specialisation as a battle painter.

He died in Rome in February 1692.

== Work ==
He is known for battle scenes and works with cavalry in battle in the style of Jacques Courtois. In particular, he specialized in painting battle scenes between Turks and Christians. He also painted scenes of military life such as military encampments.
