= Andries van Eertvelt =

Flemish painter (1590–1652)

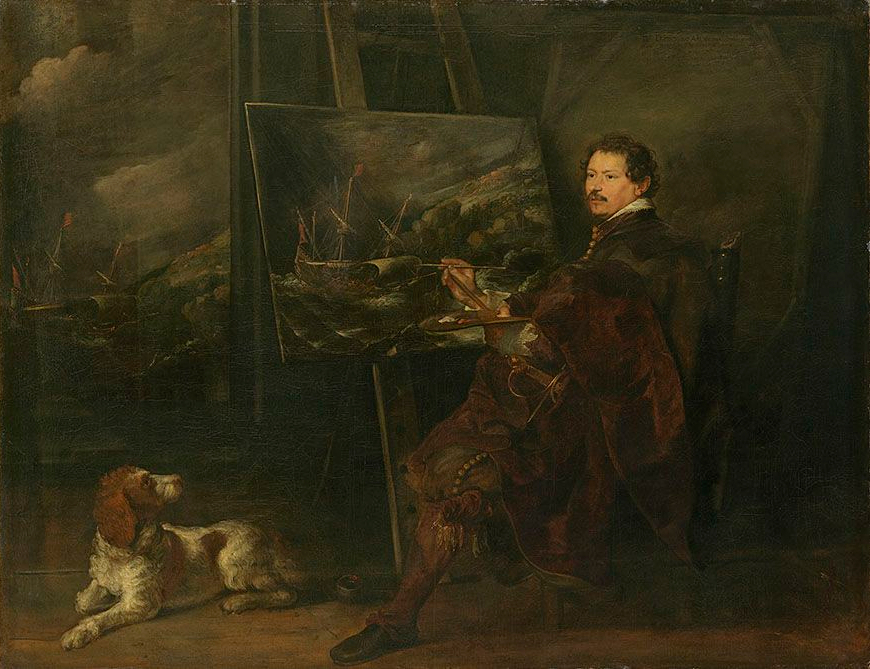
Portrait of Andries van Eertvelt by van Dyck

Andries van Eertvelt (1590–1652), was a Flemish painter, draughtsman and engraver who was one of the first Flemish artists to specialize in marine art. Several of his pupils also became prominent marine artists.

== Life ==
Andries van Eertvelt was born in Antwerp and baptized in the Antwerp cathedral on 25 March 1590. There is no record of the masters with whom he trained. He was registered as a master in the Antwerp Guild of St. Luke in 1609. He married Catherine de Vlieger on 28 November 1615 in the St. Andrew's Church. The couple had two children. His wife died in 1626 or 1627.

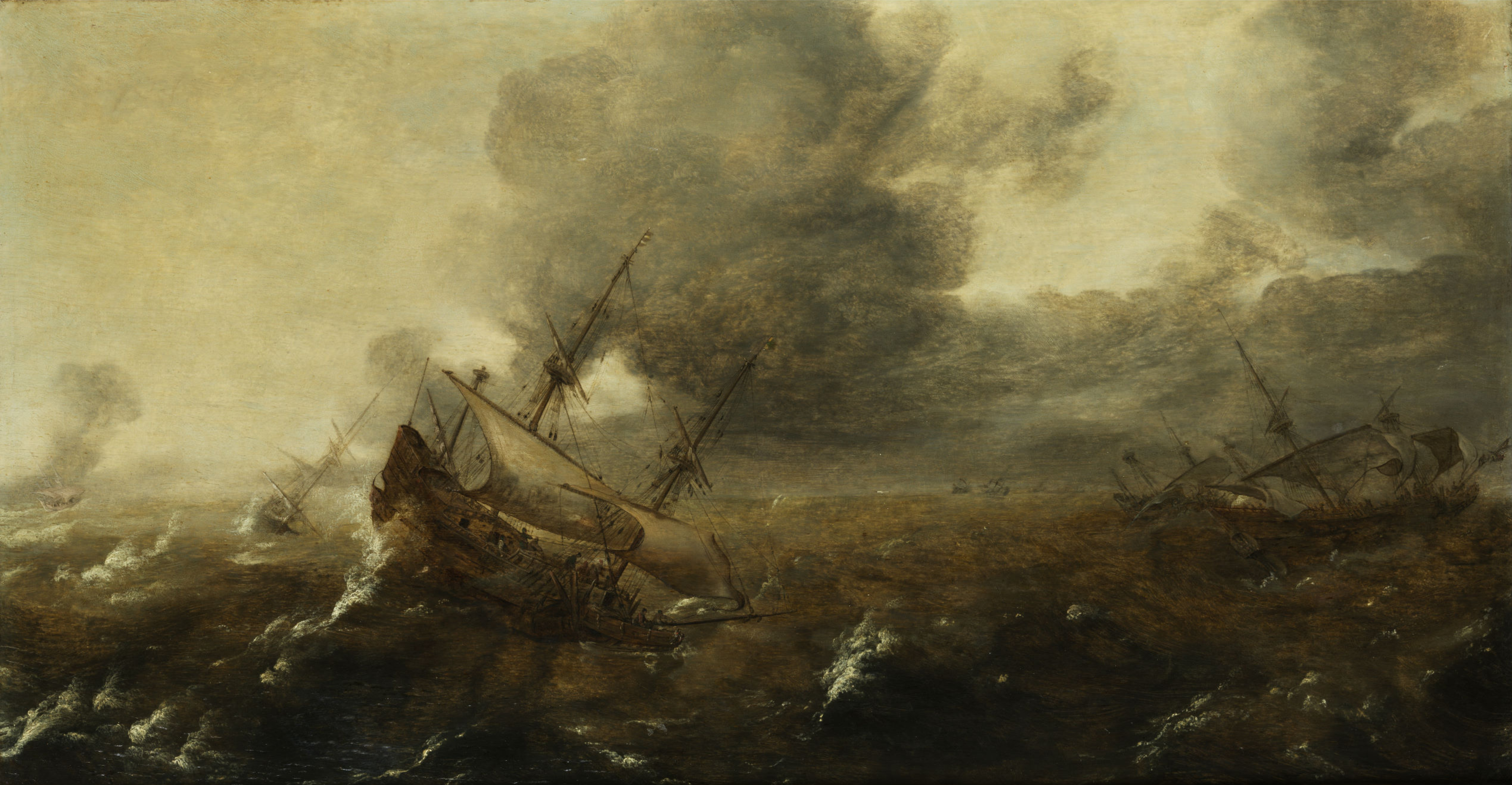
Ships in a stormy sea

After the death of his wife he travelled together with one of his pupils, Matthieu van Plattenberg, to Italy. Van Eertvelt is documented in Genoa from 1628 to 1630, where he lived with his compatriot Cornelis de Wael, who also practiced marine art, in particular the depiction of sea battles. Cornelis de Wael was a long-term resident of Genoa and arranged work for van Eervelt during his stay there.

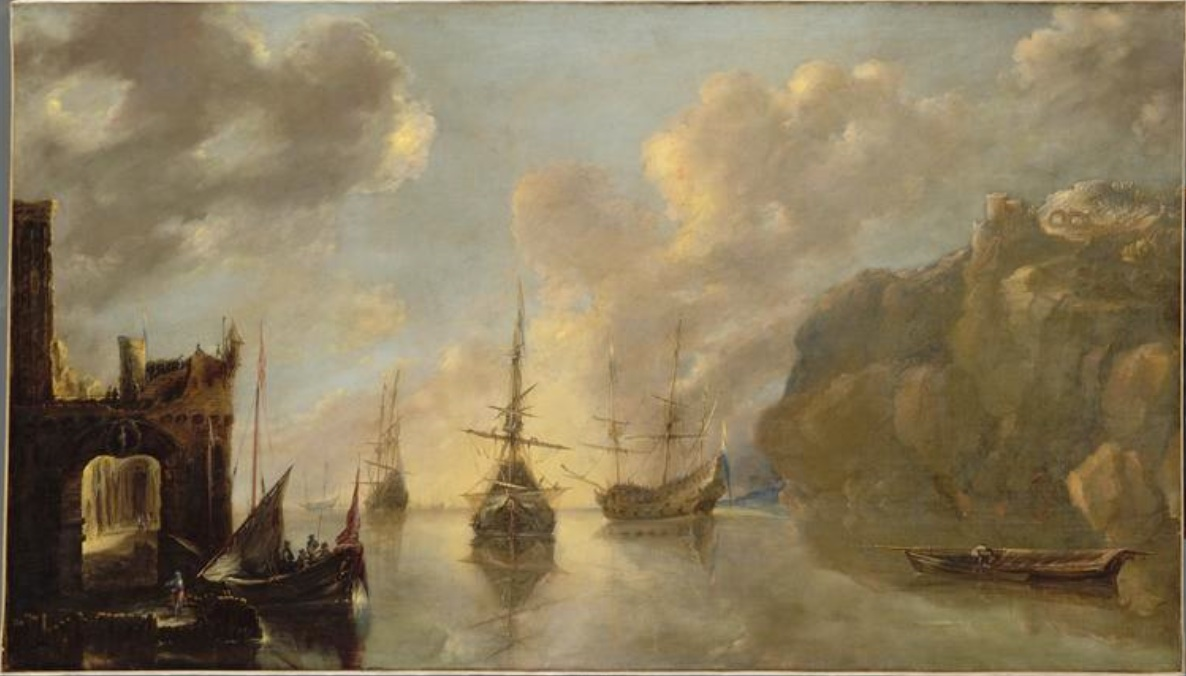
Marine, Effect of the Setting Sun, Louvre

In 1630 van Eertvelt returned to Antwerp. In the early 1630s he had a relationship with Susanna April, with whom he had two illegitimate daughters, Susanna and Annemarie (born in 1630 and 1632). On 3 October 1633 he married Elisabeth Boots in the St. James Church in Antwerp. Their son Jan Baptist was baptized in the same church on 11 February 1634.

Van Eertvelt had a very successful career as a marine artists and some of his works were exported to markets in Spain and Portugal. He also had an eager clientele in the Dutch Republic. He was remembered as a "son of the seas" by the Flemish 17th century biographer Cornelis de Bie. Anthony van Dyck painted his portrait and an engraving freely cut after this portrait by Schelte a Bolswert was included in van Dyck's "Iconography" (Icones Principum Virorum), a collection of portraits of leading personalities of van Dyck's time. Van Eertvelt also appears to have engaged in diplomatic activity. He took some letters relating to a possible peace treaty between Spain and the Dutch Republic from Balthazar Gerbier, an Anglo-Dutch diplomat residing in Antwerp, to Constantijn Huygens, the secretary to the Prince of Orange, in the Dutch Republic.

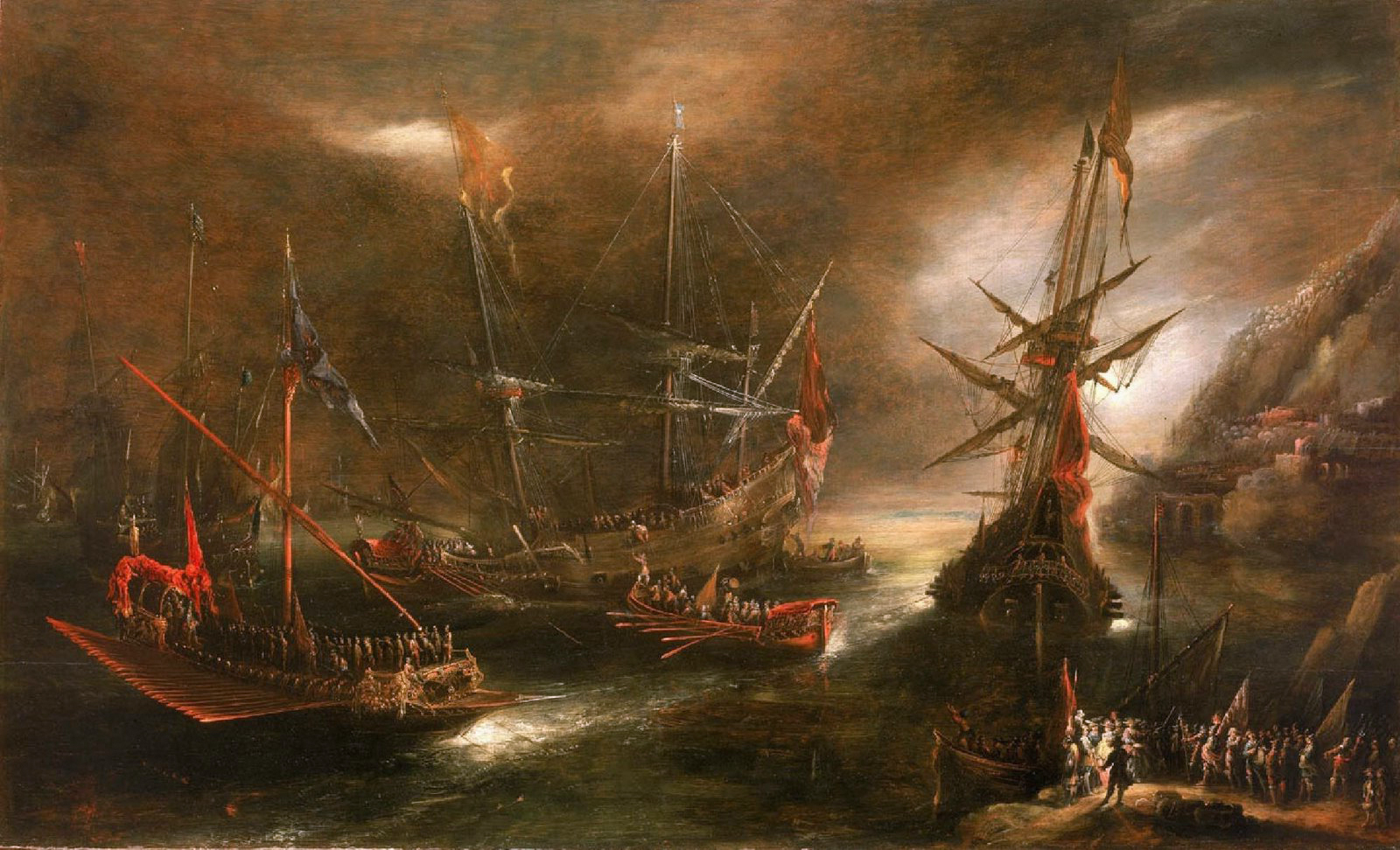
Embarkation of Spanish Troops

He was the teacher of Gaspar van Eyck, Matthieu van Plattenberg and possibly Hendrik van Minderhout. He was possibly also the teacher of the leading Flemish marine painter Bonaventura Peeters (I) and of Sebastian Castro.

== Work ==
Van Eertvelt is regarded as the first Flemish marine painter. His marine paintings covered the whole range of battle scenes, storms, views of ships in rivers and harbours, night scenes etc. His favourite themes were Dutch ships at sea and views of ships in southern, often imaginary harbours.

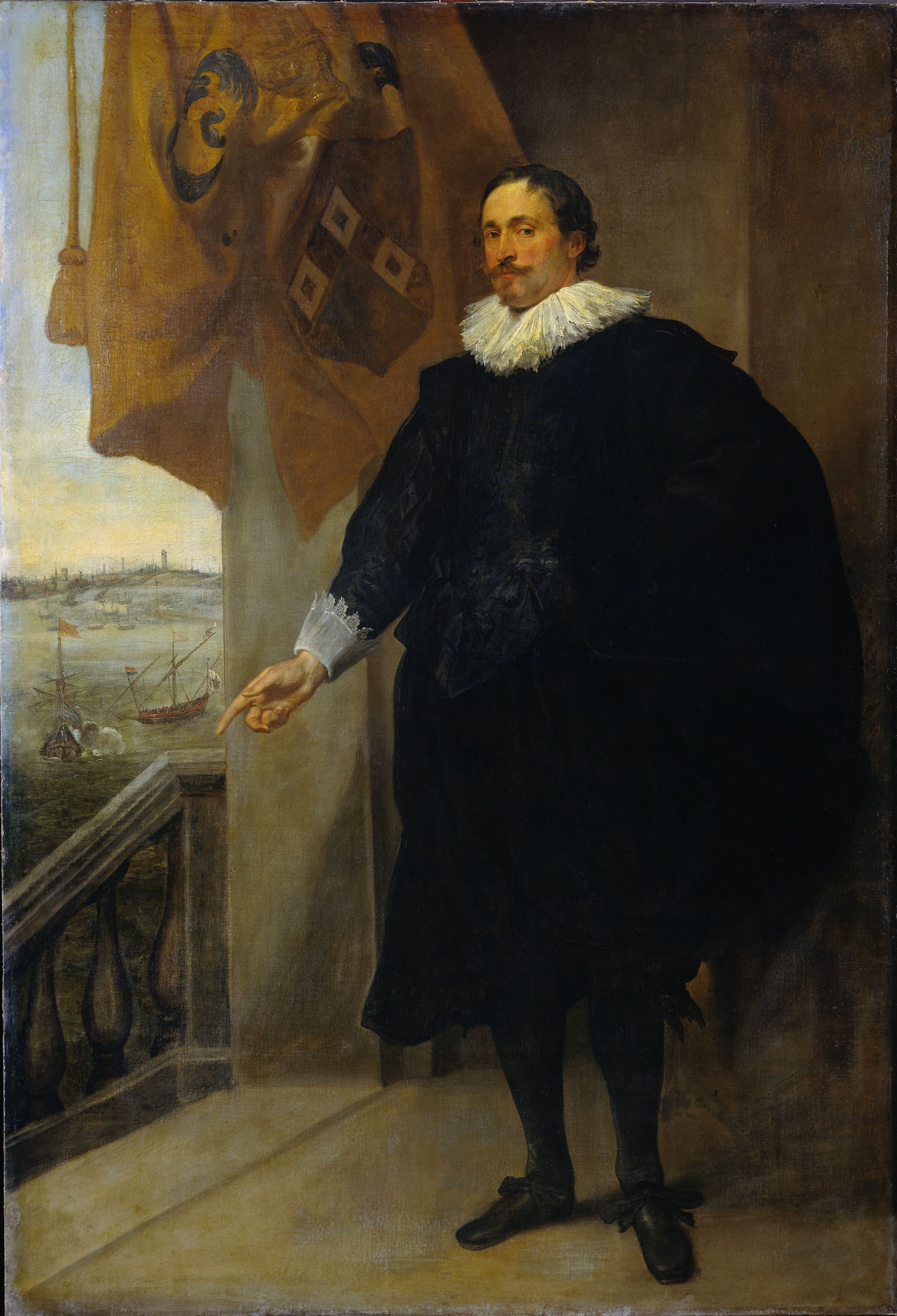
Portrait of Nicolaes van der Borght, Merchant in Antwerp, collaboration with van Dyck

Whereas there may have been an influence of Dutch marine painter Hendrick Cornelisz Vroom, some regard the impact on his style of the work of the 16th century Flemish painter Pieter Bruegel the Elder as more significant. It is assumed that van Eertvelt spent some time in the Dutch Republic in the early 1600s although there is no record of this other than his paintings of Dutch ships and ports. He may have resided in Haarlem, but there is no proof for the widespread suggestion that he studied under Vroom. He may very well have familiarized himself with Vroom's style in Antwerp where paintings of Vroom as well as copies and imitations after them were readily available in the art market. Van Eertvelt is known to have made copies of Vroom's work but was able to develop his own style.

In his early paintings, van Eertvelt adopted a bright, mannerist style and his palette was characterized by greenish-black and brown tones. He often relied on white to make the rigging of the ships stand out against the dark sea. This style is visible in The Return to Amsterdam of the Second Expedition to the East Indies on 19 July 1599 dated in the 161v0s.

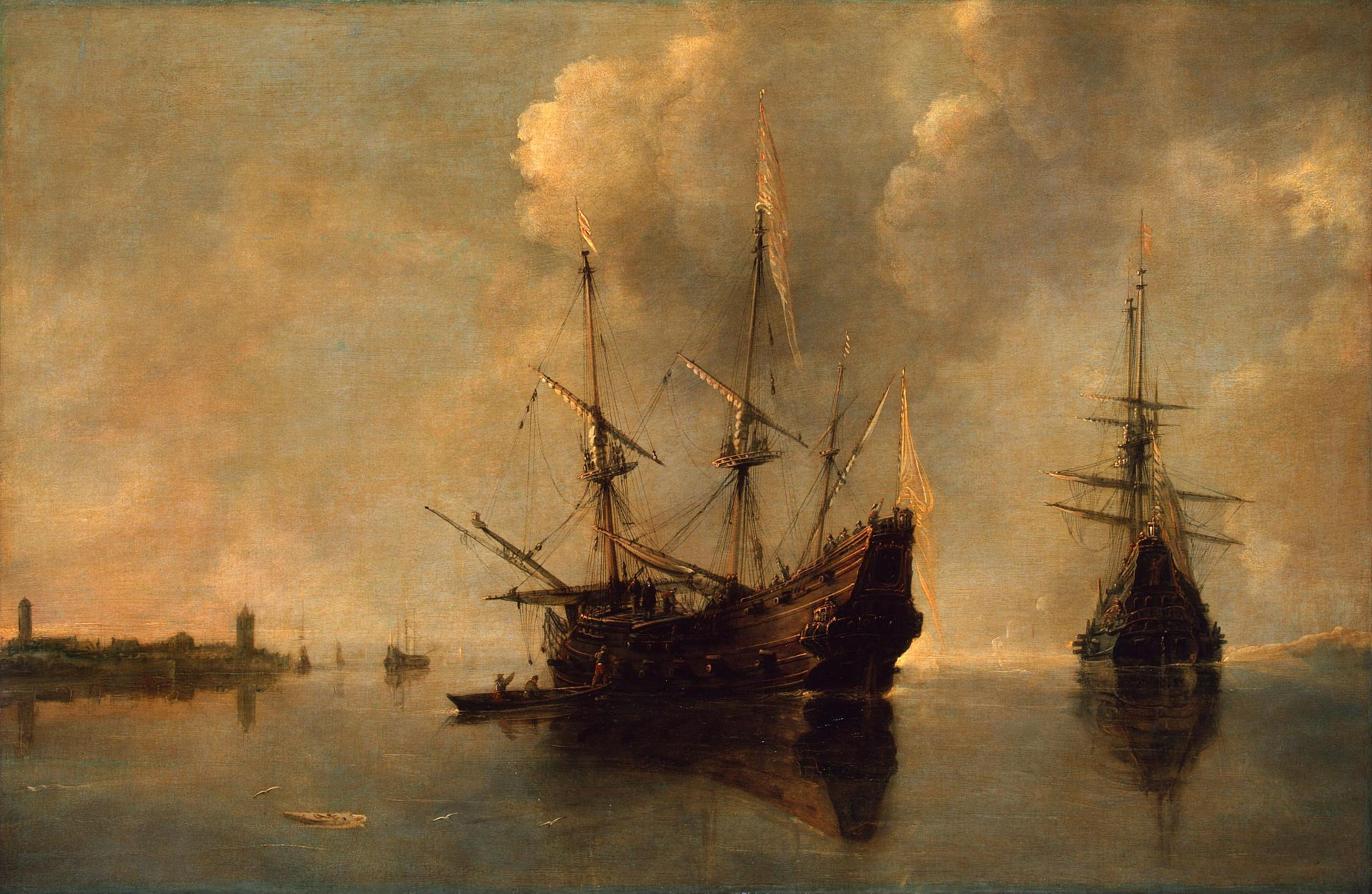
Two Ships at Anchor, Hermitage Museum

Later he changed to a softer and more subtle palette in particular after his return from Italy. He then favoured views of southern harbours, with calm seas painted in soft tones. This mature style is visible in the Two Ships at Anchor in the Hermitage Museum.

Van Eertvelt collaborated occasionally with other Antwerp painters. The seascape in van Dyck's Portrait of Nicolaes van der Borght, Merchant in Antwerp is attributed to van Eertvelt.

Van Eertvelt was also active as an engraver. The current whereabouts of an etching by his hand, depicting the frozen river Scheldt in 1621 and another of the fort 'Vlaams Hoofd' in Antwerp mentioned in reports are not known.
