= Gerard van Kuijl =

Dutch Golden Age painter

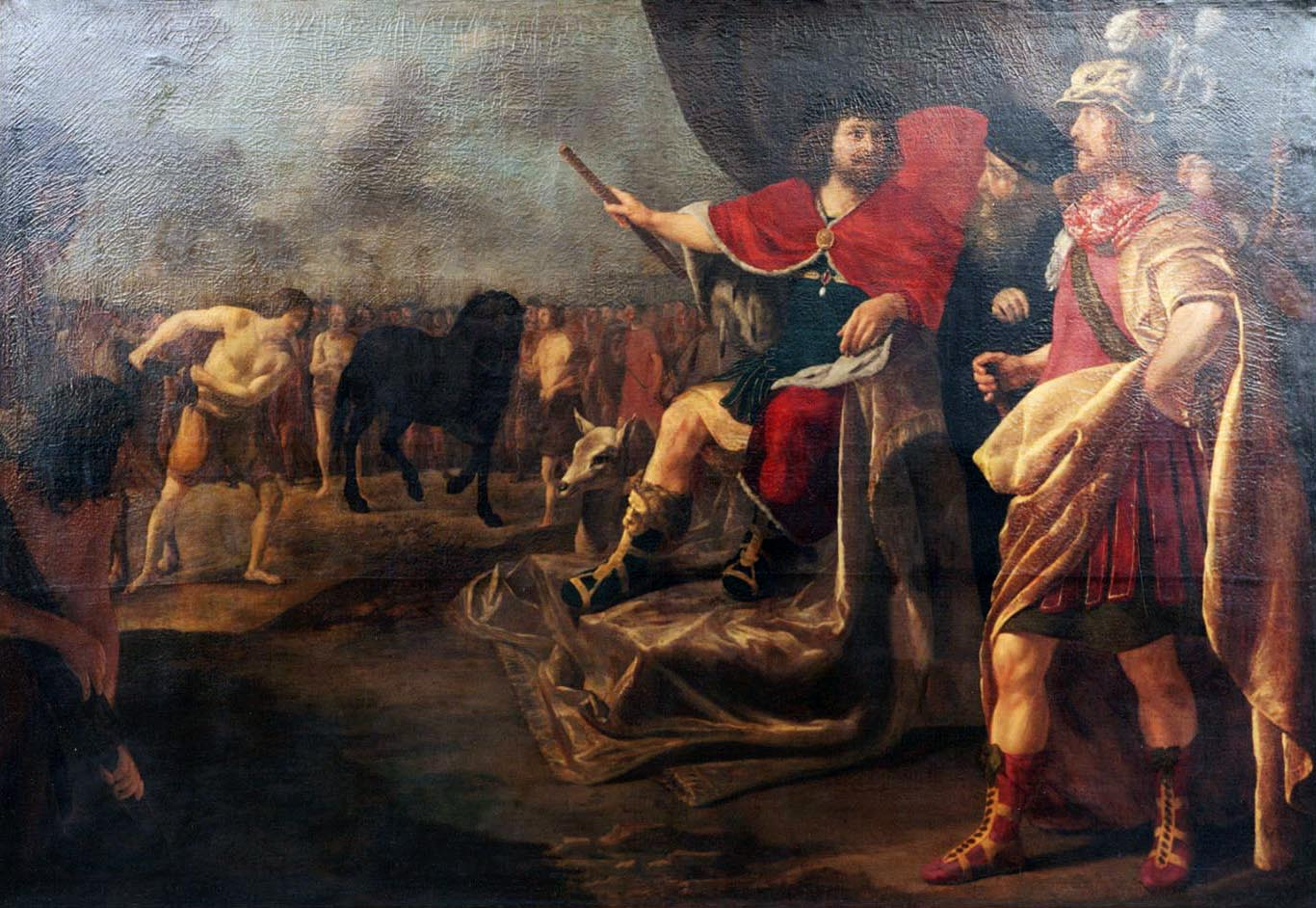
Quintus Sertorius and the horse tail, allegory of good government, Gorinchem City Hall, 1638

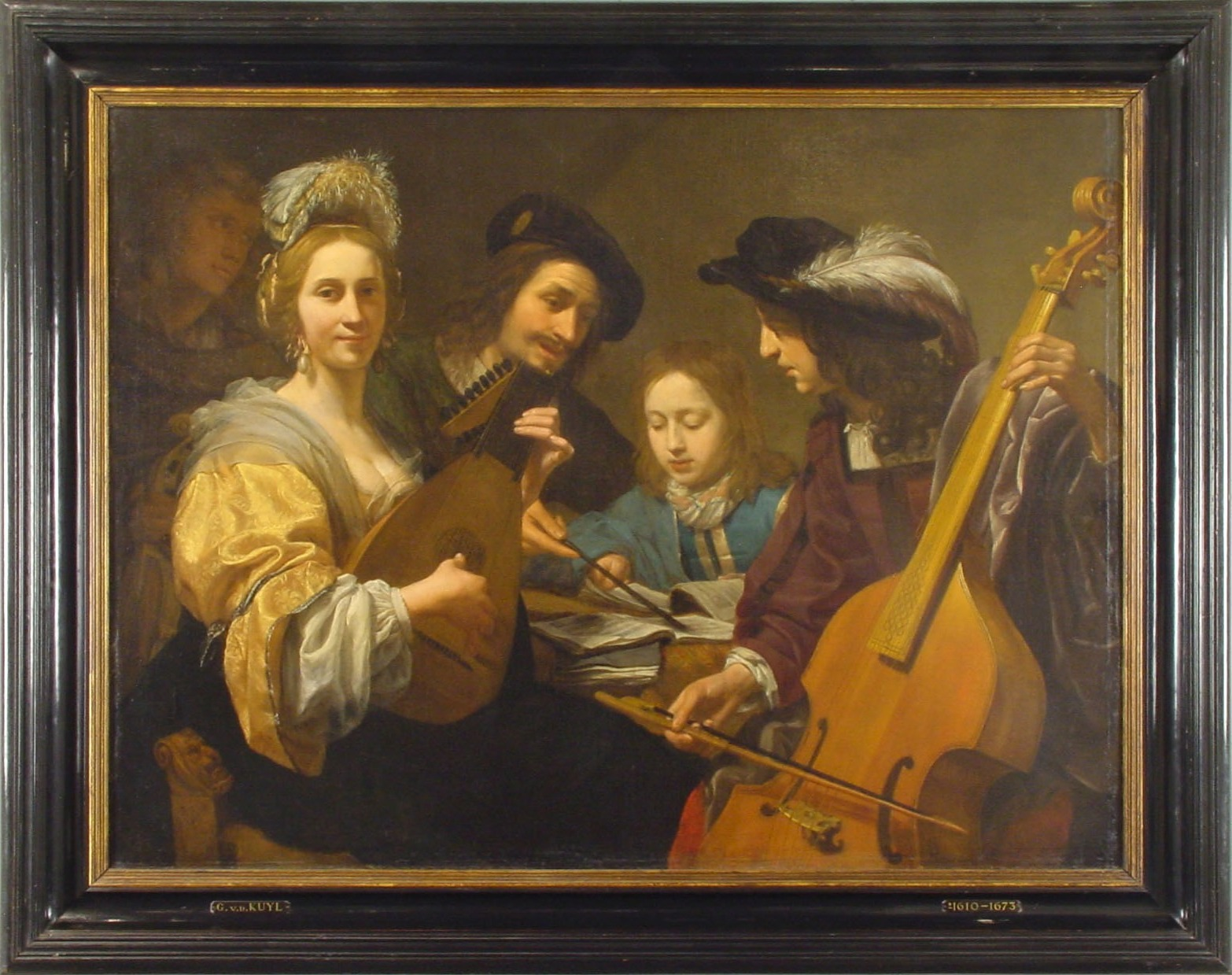
Musicerend gezelschap ("Musical company"), Rijksmuseum Twente, 1651

Gerard van Kuijl or Kuijll (1604, Gorinchem – 1673, Gorinchem), was a Dutch Golden Age painter. He is known for religious and genre works in the style of Caravaggio.

== Biography ==
Van Kuijl was born on 30 January 1604 to Frank van Kuijll and Johanna van Blockland. In his Teutsche Academie (1675), Von Sandrart erroneously called him "Gerard van Krick", and for centuries Van Kuijl was convoluted with a citizen from Gouda named Gijsbert van der Kuijl described by Houbraken. According to Houbraken, Gijsbert van der Kuijl was the travel companion of the Gouda painter Aert van Waes, who spent 11 years with him in Italy and then returned without him only to die in Gouda in 1649, while Gijsbert spent a total of 20 years in Italy and after returning north enjoyed a longer life, dying in Gouda in 1673.

In contrast, Gerard van Kuijl was a pupil of Gerard Honthorst in 1625 in Utrecht and never lived in Gouda. He probably left for Italy in 1627 or 1628, as in 1627 he wrote a will, perhaps in preparation for the trip. He joined the Bentvueghels with the nickname Stijgbeugel. In Italy he was a pupil of fellow Bentvueghel Jean Ducamps, with whom he lived from 1629 to 1631 in Rome on the Via Margutta. The last evidence of his presence there was in July 1631. The next year, Van Kuijl had settled again in Gorinchem, as in 1632 he became a member of the Broederschap der Romeinen binnen Gorinchem ("Brotherhood of Romans in Gorinchem'") and around that time he married Margaretha Dierout there. In 1641 he lived in Utrecht, but in or before 1648 he returned to his hometown, where he died at the age of 69 and his burial was prepared on 6 March 1673.
