= Jean Ducamps =

Flemish painter (1600–1648)

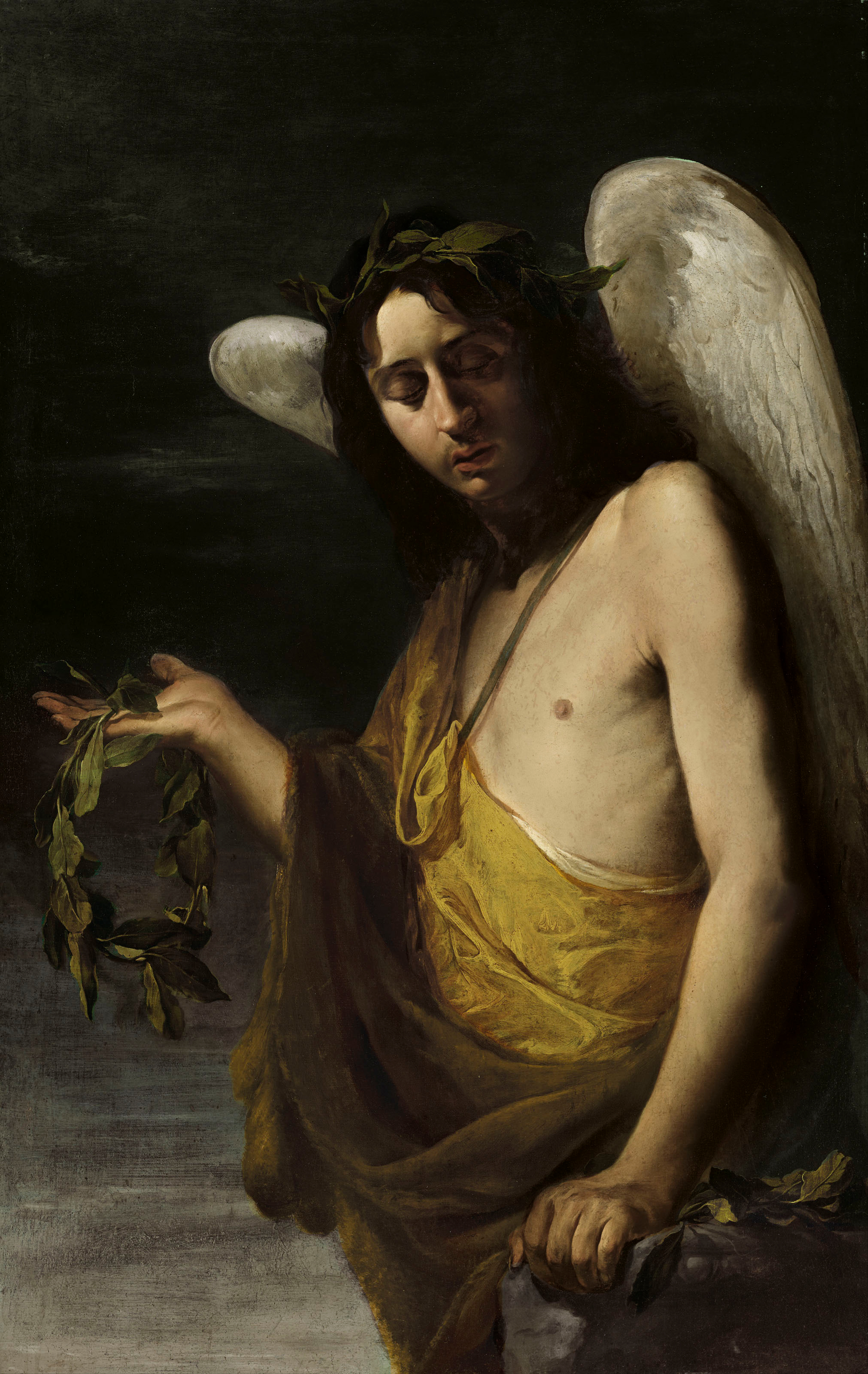
Allegory of virtuous love

Jean Ducamps, Giovanni di Filippo del Campo or Giovanni del Campo (1600, Cambrai or Cambrai – 1648, Madrid), was a Flemish Baroque painter who spent most of his career in Italy where he enjoyed renown for his religious compositions, genre scenes and allegories. He worked in a style that was influenced by Caravaggio and is counted amongst the Northern Caravaggisti.

== Life ==
His first biographer Joachim von Sandrart stated that Ducamps learned to paint from Abraham Janssens in Antwerp. He travelled to Rome where he became a follower of Caravaggio. There are different views about the length of his stay in Rome. The following dates have been proposed: from 1622 to 1641, from 1626 to 1638 and from 1622 to 1637 (also to the end of 1636).

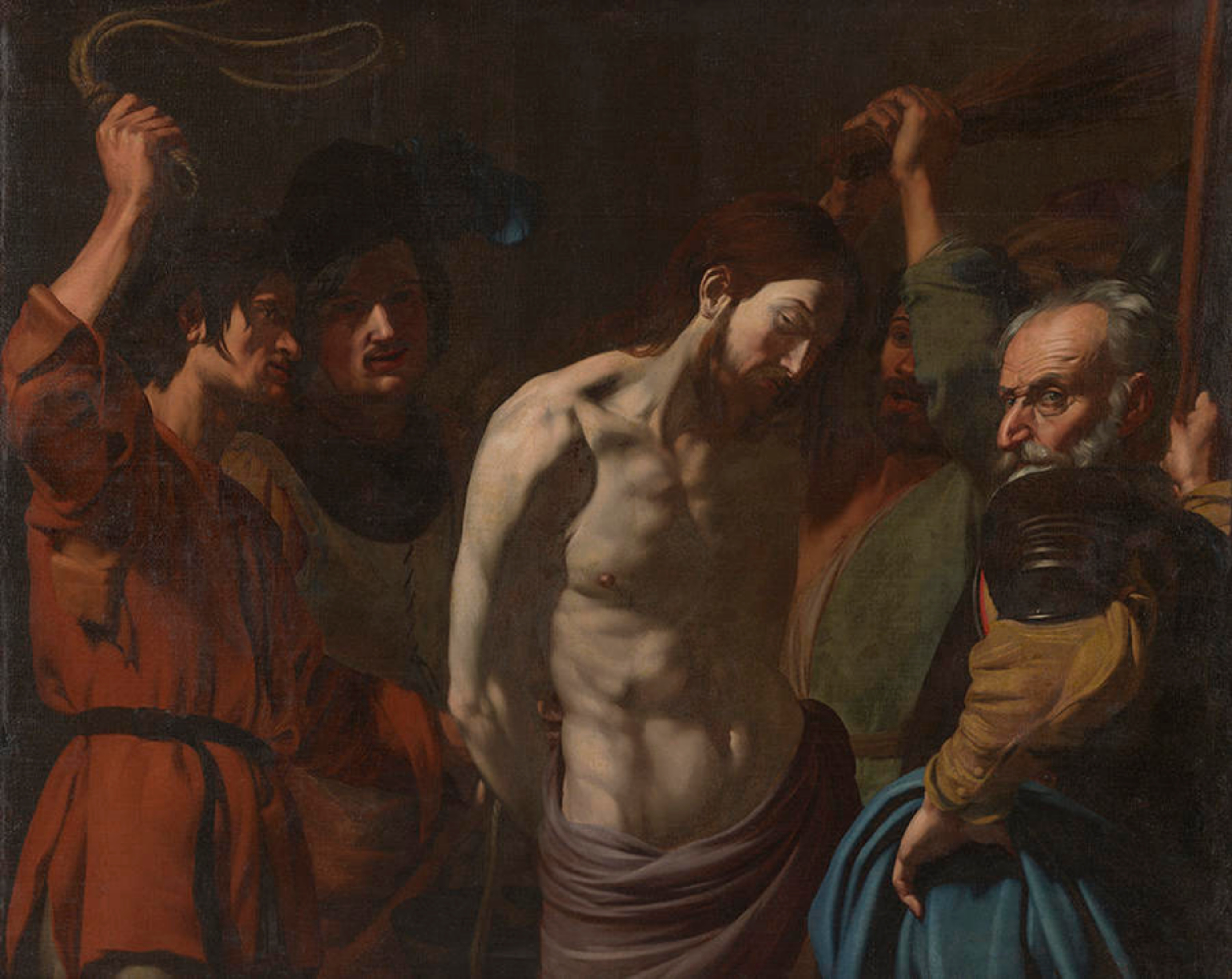
The flagellation of Christ

He was in Rome actively involved in the creation of the Bentvueghels, an association of mainly Dutch and Flemish artists working in Rome. He took in the Bentvueghels the nickname 'Braef ', 'Braeff' or 'Brave' (meaning the good or brave one). He was a spokesman and advocate of the Bentvueghels on various occasions and handled disagreements and disputes with local agencies. He acted in a dispute with the Academy of St Luke, the local association of artists in Rome, which had the right to determine who could call himself an artist in Rome.

He lived in 1622 in Rome with the painter Thomas Cortiels in a house of the family Altoviti from Florence. There are various reports on the people he live with in the Strada Margutta in Rome in the period from 1623 to 1628. The persons who have been mentioned include Tomaso Fiamengo (a painter), Tomaso Cotiemps, Ghiongrat, Belthasar, Antionio Fiamengo (a painter), Natale (a French servant), Gasparo Fiamengo (a painter), Novello Fabap (a servant?), Antonio Colina (a painter), Tomaso Cortielz and Gaspar Taunz. Some sources state that from 1626 to 1638 he shared a residence in the Via Margutta with Pieter van Laer. Pieter van Laer was an influential Dutch painter and printmaker. He was active in Rome for over a decade and was known mainly for his genre scenes depicting common people of Rome in their surroundings, which were so influential that they gave rise to a genre of painting referred to as Bambocciata. Ducamps may also have shared that residence with Gerard van der Kuijl and, possibly, Alexander van Wevelinckhoven.

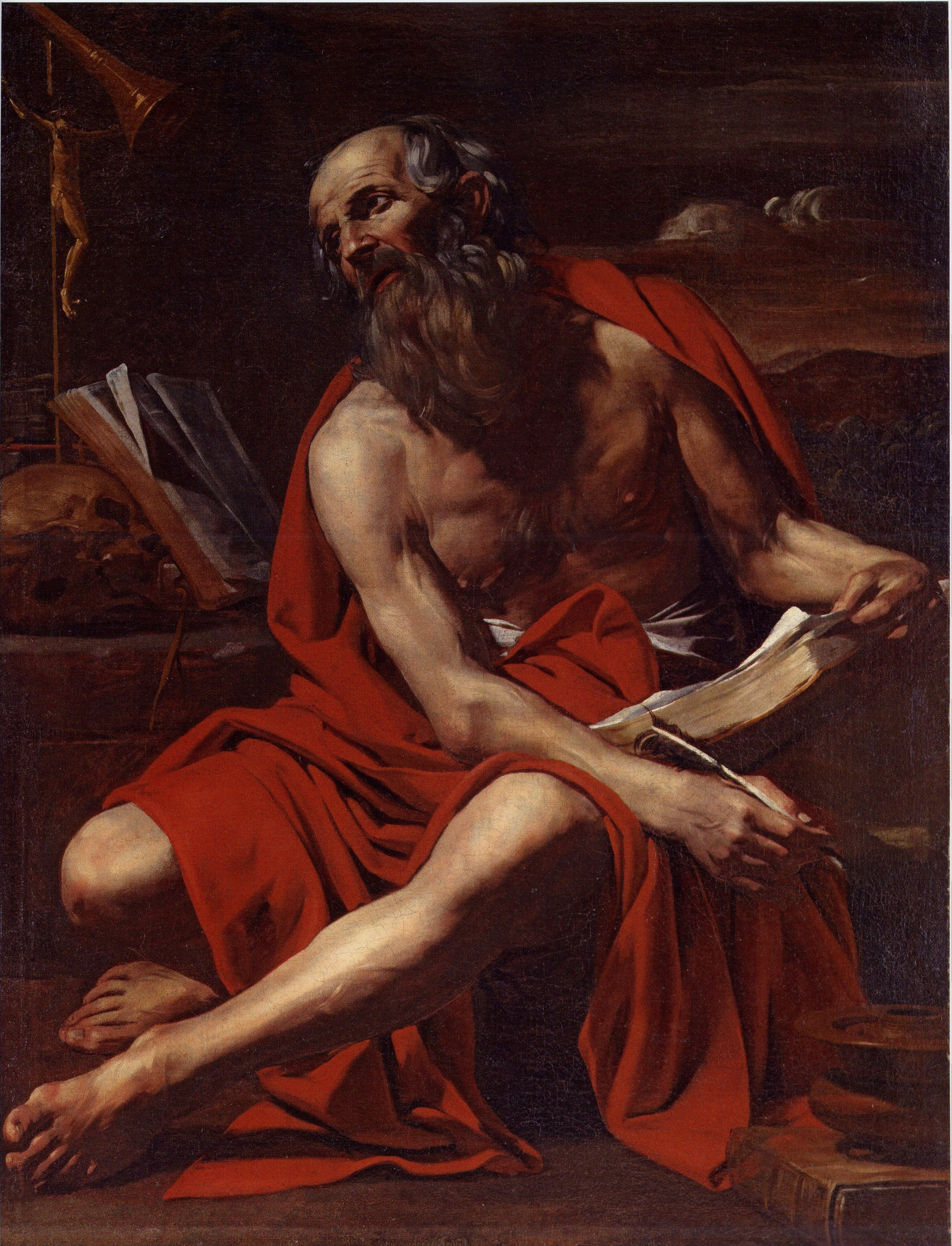
St Jerome

On 8 July 1631 Ducamps and his friend Jacomo Cabrijol (Capriola) were involved in a drunken brawl in which they attacked the painters Marcus Wouters and Hendrik van Houten. The legal complications arising from the brawl dragged on until 1 August. Joachim von Sandrart cites financial hardship as the reason why Ducamps finally left Rome. He travelled to Madrid around 1637 and 1638 in the company of the Manuel de Moura Corte Real, 2nd Marquis of Castelo Rodrigo, ambassador to Rome of Philip IV of Spain. In Madrid he is said to have obtained commissions from the Spanish king Philip IV as well as have worked for his compatriots from Flanders who had established themselves in Spain such as Philippe François, 1st Duke of Arenberg.

It is not clear when he died as all trace of him is lost in Spain.

== Work ==
Von Sandrart states that during his stay in Rome Ducamps painted in the style of Caravaggio and excelled in religious subjects, history paintings and landscapes. He mentions that Ducamps painted many paintings of evangelists and apostles a half length made after life and was particularly strong in history painting as demonstrated by a painting of the Liberation of Saint Peter. He also painted allegories and genre paintings.

As no signed works by him are known, it has been difficult to establish his oeuvre. A key work in his oeuvre is the Allegory of virtuous love (private collection, formerly on loan to the Yale University Art Gallery). This works was given to Ducamps based on a deposition made by the Dutch painter Leonaert Bramer in 1672. In the deposition Bramer states that 40 years earlier he had bought in Rome a painting by Giovanni di Filippo del Campo depicting a 'standing angel, seen to the hips, with two wings and a sheep's skin around his body and a small laurel crown in his hand'. This description fit perfectly the Allegory of virtuous love and was therefore conclusively attributed to Ducamps. The work has become a starting point for other attributions to the artist.

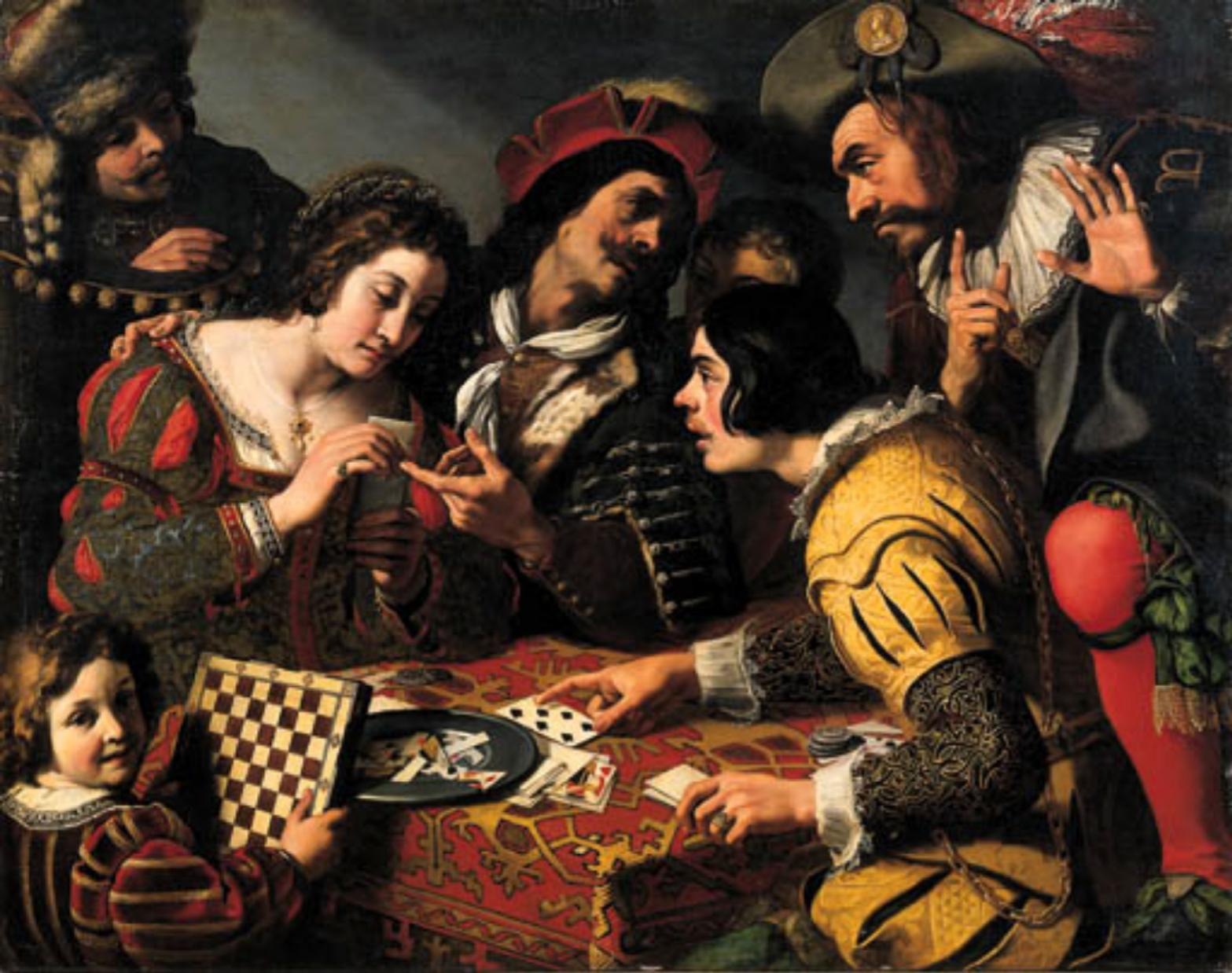
The card sharps

The Italian art historian Gianni Papi tentatively attributed to Ducamps a group of works which had been given to an anonymous master with the notname Master of the Incredulity of St. Thomas, a Caravaggist painter active in Rome in the period 1620-1640. To this painter had been attributed several works grouped around a painting with the subject of the Incredulity of St. Thomas that are kept in the Palazzo Valentini in Rome. A Liberation of Saint Peter was also part of this set of paintings. These works show a stylistic kinship with the Caravaggists Cecco del Caravaggio and Nicolas Tournier as well as Valentin de Boulogne. By retaining a certain classicism, these works combine the more elegant aspects of Caravaggism with a lyrical and monumental approach. They further incorporate the innovations brought about by Giovanni Antonio Galli, also known as Spadarino, who reinterpreted Caravaggism in the 1630s. This approach imbued Caravaggesque painting with the dignitas that fuelled the meditations of the Bamboccianti.

The art historian Francesca Curti identified in 2019 the Master of the Incredulity of St. Thomas with the painter Bartolomeo Mendozzi, who was active in Rome between the 1620 and the 1640s. He trained in the workshop of Bartolomeo Manfredi. The identification is based on documentary research and stylistic comparisons with the paintings depicting the Martyrdom of St. Lawrence and the Martyrdom of St. Stephen in the Cathedral of Rieti. In an 18th-century document, the canvases were recorded as the works of a "Mendozzi", a painter born around 1600 in Leonessa. It is not clear what this finding means for the identification of the works of the Master of the Incredulity of St. Thomas that were earlier attributed to Ducamps.

It is possible that he was the Juan del Campo who collaborated in Madrid with the Flemish marine artist Gaspar van Eyck and painted the staffage in van Eyck's harbour views.
