= Gaspar van Eyck =

Flemish painter

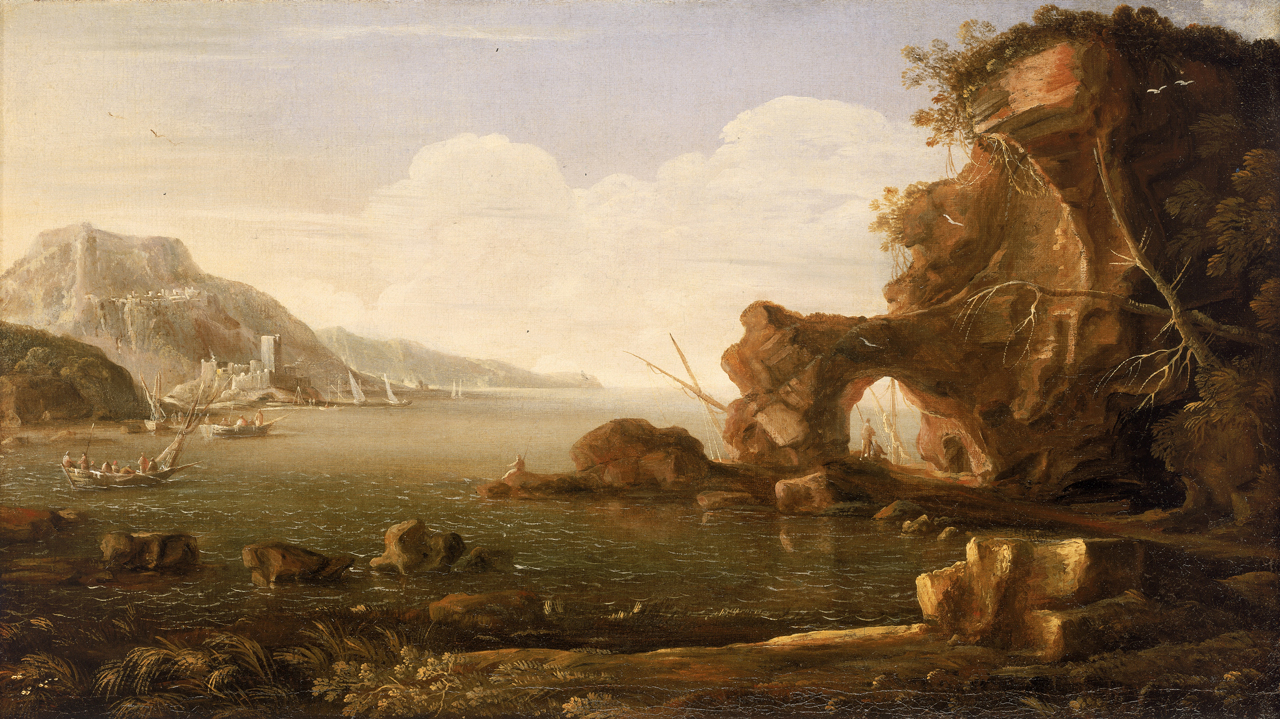
Mediterranean coast scene

Gaspar or Casper van Eyck (baptized 6 February 1613; died before December 1674) was a Flemish painter of marine subjects and sea-fights. He worked in Antwerp and spent some time working in Genoa and Madrid.

== Life ==
Van Eyck was born in Antwerp as the son of the tailor Nicolaas van Eyck, originally from the Prince-Bishopric of Liège, and Joanna Ros. He was baptized on 6 February 1613. He had a sister and three brothers, of whom Nicolaas became a painter of equestrian and battle scenes, landscapes and portraits. He was the uncle of the landscape painter Jan Carel van Eyck.

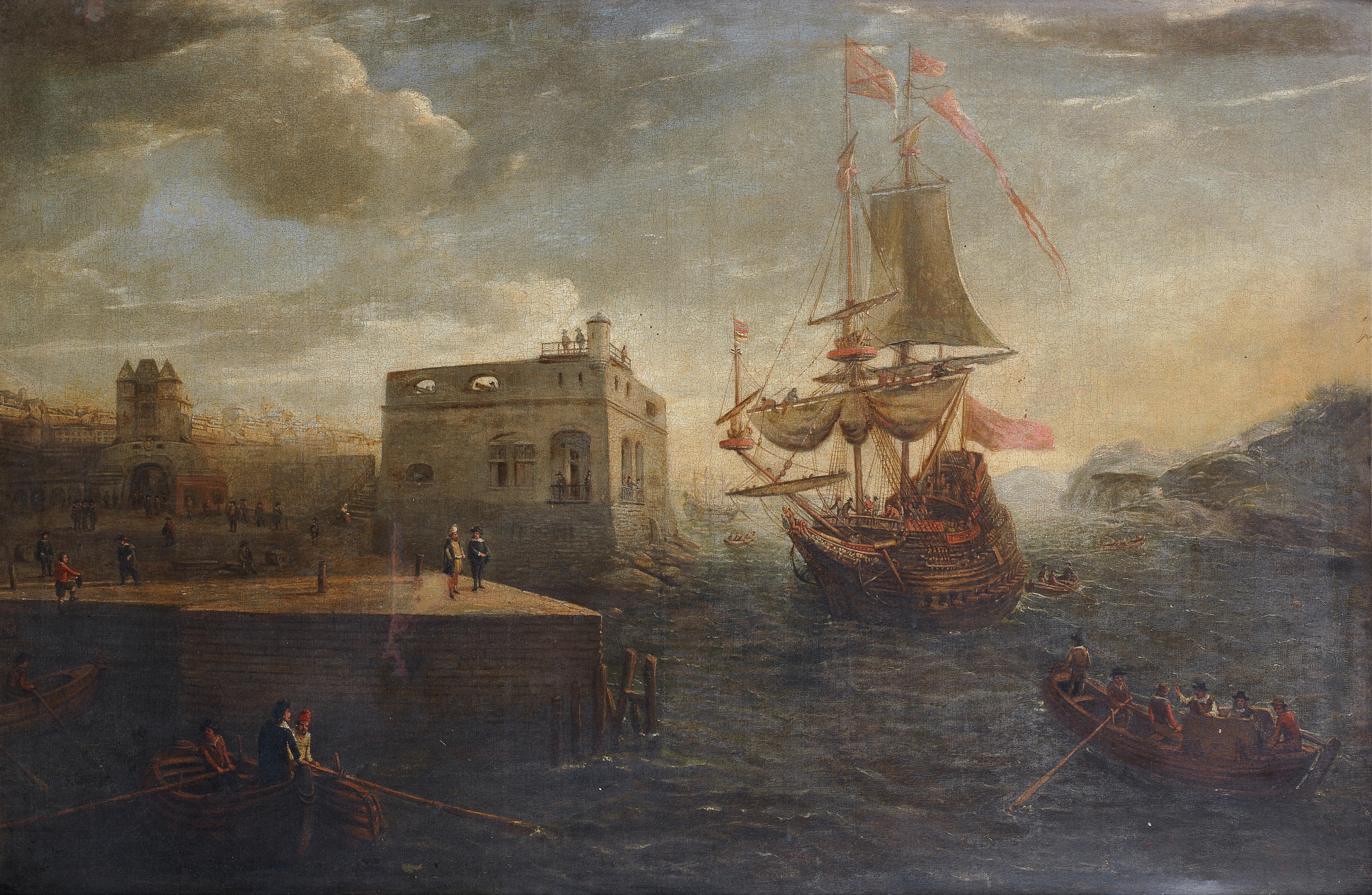
Port scene, with an artist, possibly van Eyck, painting seated in a small boat

He was registered at Antwerp's Guild of Saint Luke as a pupil of the prominent marine painter Andries van Eertvelt under whom he started to study in 1625. Van Eyck became a master in the Guild of St. Luke in the guild year 1632–1633.

He traveled in 1632 to Genoa, where he collaborated with the Flemish painter and art dealer Cornelis de Wael. De Wael and his brother Lucas had established a workshop in Genoa in 1628 which had become the centre of the colony of Flemish artists who resided in or passed through the city. These Flemish artists could take advantage of the work and artistic activity that the brothers' workshop attracted. Van Eyck's master Andries van Eertvelt had also worked in Genoa with the de Wael brothers in the period from 1628 to 1630.

He was in Madrid in 1649 and 1650 where he was briefly working for the court. He was there likely with the Flemish painter Giovanni di Filippo del Campo with whom he collaborated on paintings. He was back in Antwerp in 1656 and then moved to Brussels the same year. Here he remained until his death in 1673. He is believed to have suffered from mental illness and his brother Hendrick, who was a clergyman, was his guardian after the death of their parents.

== Work ==
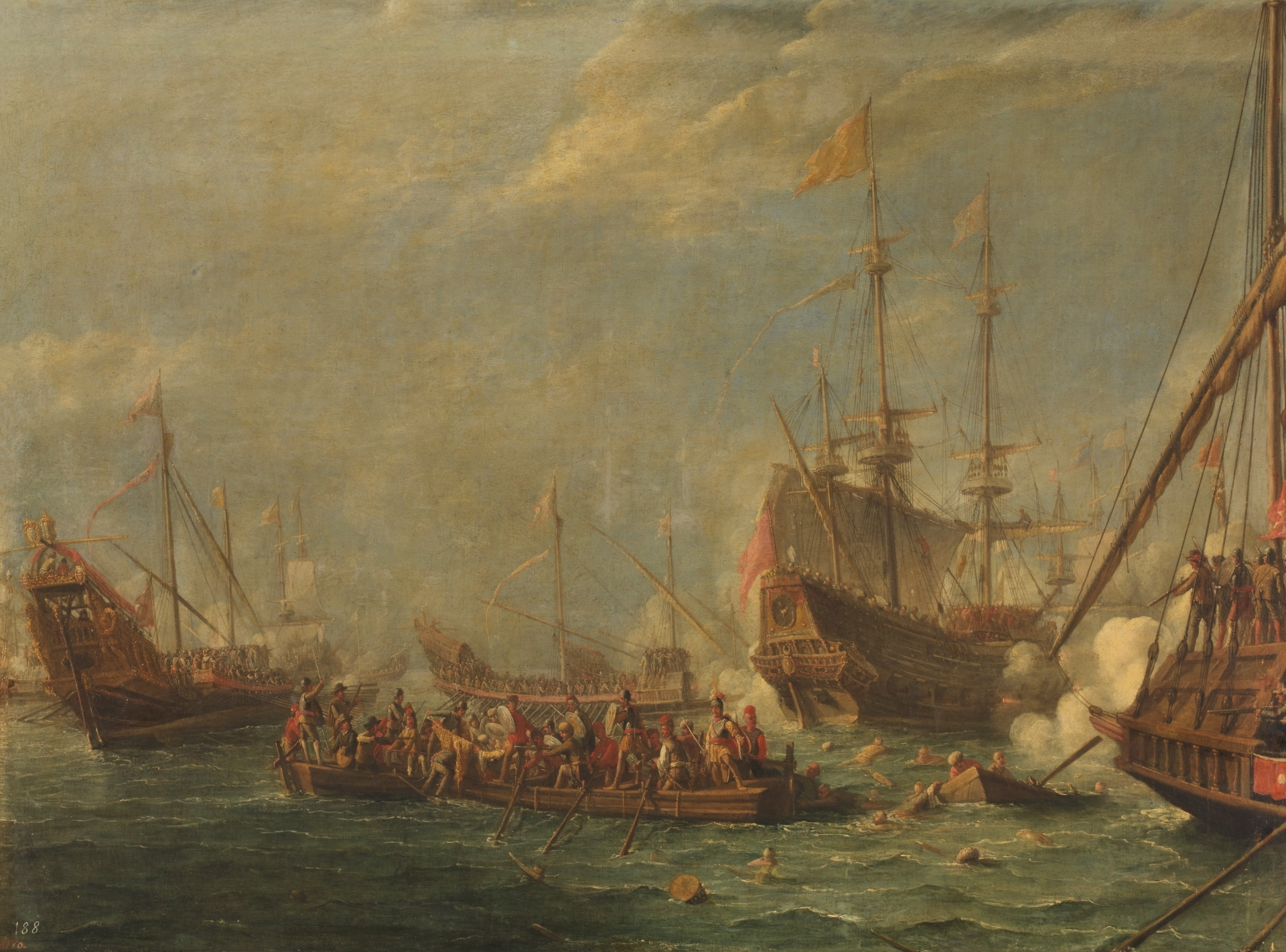
Naval Battle between Turks and Maltese

Van Eyck was a marine specialist. His paintings comprise the whole range of marine painting including marine battles, storms, shipwrecks, views of ships in rivers, coastal waters and ports, etc. He painted various types of ships, including Turkish galleys with Turkish figures on them.

He worked in the Flemish mannerist tradition of his master Andries van Eertvelt. His paintings are typically small-sized with tiny figures engaging in diverse actions and poses. Air and water acquire in his works a blurred and transparent quality, thus creating the impression that the works are unfinished. A closer view of his paintings shows the delicacy of the representation. Van Eyck worked closely with Giovanni di Filippo del Campo, who added the figures to his marines. While in Spain, van Eyck and del Campo worked for Flemish collectors based in Madrid, such as the Duke of Aarschot, who generously sponsored his work, and contributed to the distribution of his paintings in Spain.

Three pictures by him are in the Museo del Prado. They did not enter the royal collection until the 18th century, through the collection of Charles IV. At least two of them are dated 1649, suggesting a presence of his work in Spain since the 17th century. In these three canvases he shows his knowledge of southern European painting, both in the Italianization of some details and in certain loans from the work of Claude Lorrain and hints of the Battle of Ostia by Raphael. These traits are visible in the Naval Battle between Turks and Maltese.
