= Nicolaas van Eyck =

Flemish painter (1617–1679)

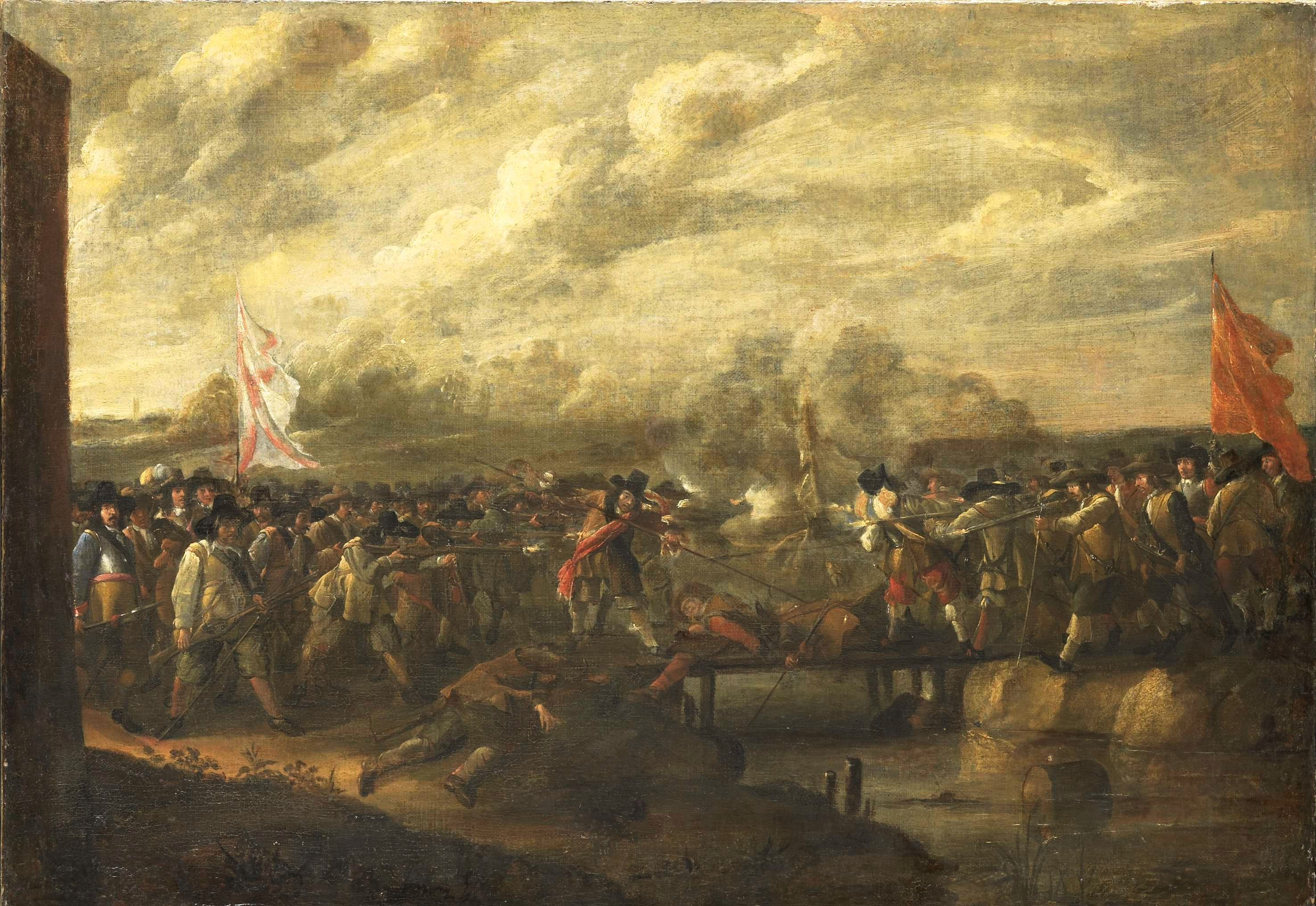
Infantry battle at a bridge

Nicolaas van Eyck or Nicolaes van Eyck (1617–1679) was a Flemish painter active in Antwerp in the middle of the 17th century. He is known for his equestrian and battle scenes, landscapes and portraits. He also painted a few civil processions, including parades of the Antwerp civil militia.

== Life ==
Nicolaas van Eyck was born in Antwerp as the son of the tailor Nicolaas van Eyck, originally from the Prince-Bishopric of Liège, and Joanna Ros. He was baptized on 9 February 1617. He had a sister and three brothers, of whom Gaspar became a marine painter. He was registered at Antwerp's Guild of Saint Luke as a pupil of the prominent genre and history painter Theodoor Rombouts under whom he started to study in the 1632. There is no record of the date on which he became a master of the Guild.

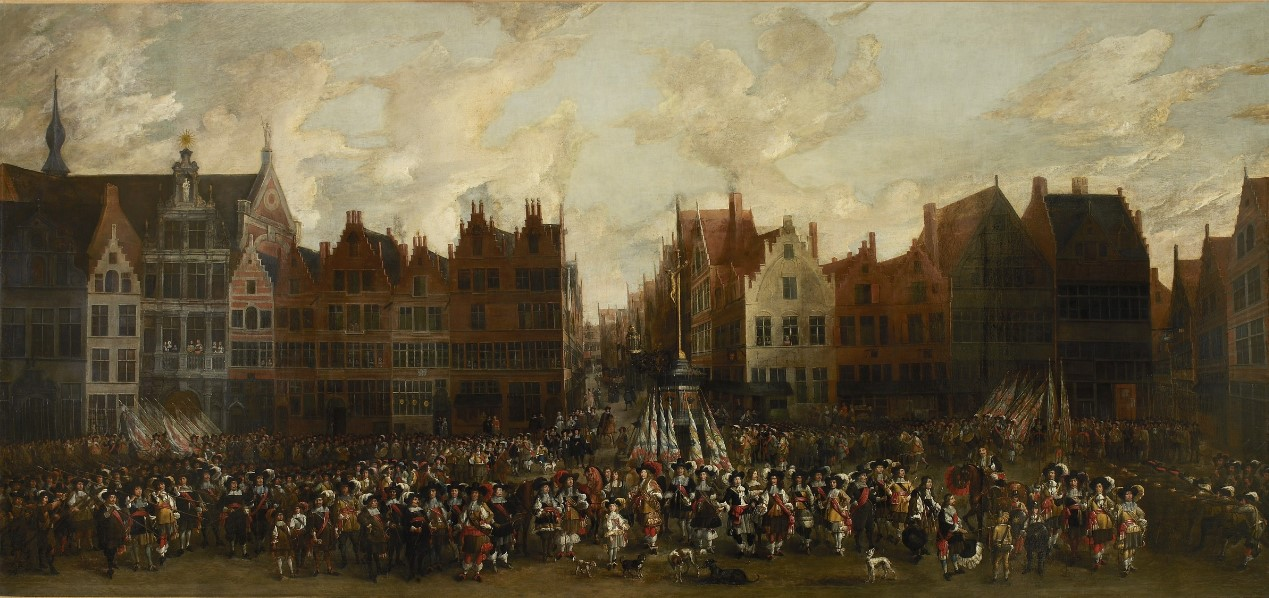
Grand parade of the civil guard of Antwerp on the Meir

He married Dymphna Heyman on 16 September 1643. The couple moved to a prestigious address on the Meir in Antwerp. He became a captain of a local schutterij in 1658. This may be a reason why he painted military scenes.

He was friends with the flower painter Jan Philip van Thielen, who had also been a pupil of Rombouts. Van Eyck was godfather to at least one of van Thielen's nine children.

He was the teacher of Pieter Hofman. His sons Nicolaas II and Jan Carel van Eyck became painters. Jan Carel was a pupil of Jan Erasmus Quellinus and travelled to Italy where after 1677 all trace of him was lost.

Van Eyck died in Antwerp in 1679.

== Work ==
Nicolaas van Eyck is principally known for his landscapes with soldiers and horsemen engaged in battle or resting. Records show that he also painted portraits, religious compositions and vanitas still lifes. He painted a number of compositions representing scenes of urban warfare and rebellion. Van Eyck further painted some genre scenes of village feasts and dancing farmers.

Van Eyck also painted civil processions, including a composition representing the Grand parade of the civil guard of Antwerp on the Meir (1672, Vleeshuis, Antwerp). A Scene from a parade of the civil guard (Hospitalfield Arts) appears to be a fragment of a painting depicting a parade of the civil guard in Antwerp. The scene shows a demonstration of fire arms. A row of arquebusiers are discharging their rifles in the direction of a row of men standing in front of them. Clearly they were not using real bullets but only powder. Such displays appear to have been common in civil parades of that time as can be seen in the Ommeganck in Brussels on 31 May 1615 by Denis van Alsloot, which includes a similar scene.

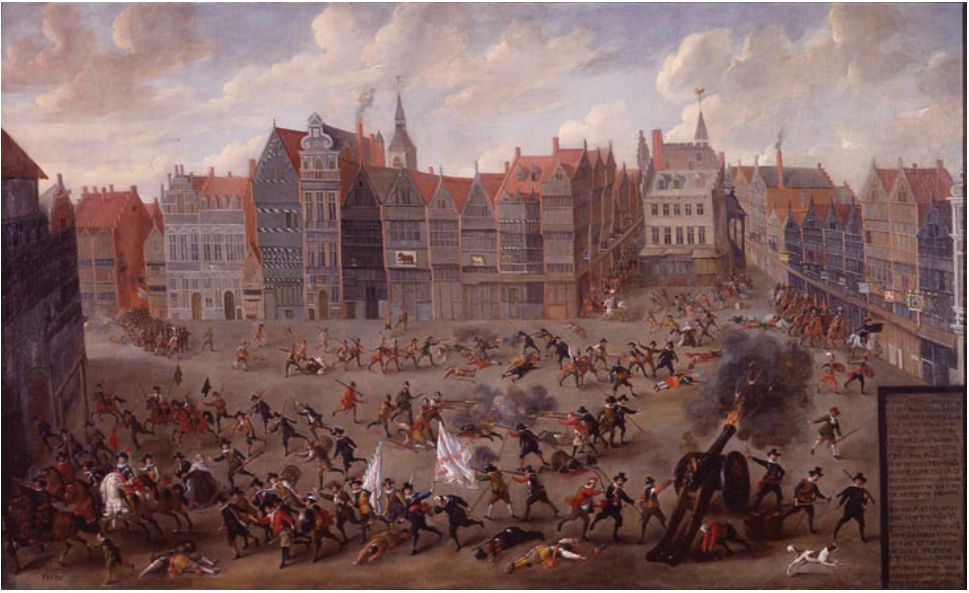
The taking of Mechelen by the Geuzen under the command of Olivier van Tympele and John Norreys on 9 April 1580

A few of Van Eyck's compositions depict scenes of the civil unrest and war that took place in Flanders during the 16th century. An example is the set of two paintings on the Taking of Mechelen by the Geuzen under the command of Olivier van Tympele and John Norreys on 9 April 1580 (Stedelijke Musea Mechelen). The paintings depict the taking of Mechelen by English troops in the name of the Protestant Northern Netherlands, a military action which developed into atrocities on the civil population known as the English Fury of 1580. The hostilities are shown in the paintings from respectively the north and south of the city square. The city square is filled with militiamen and enemy soldiers and artillery pieces and guns firing. The artist emphasized the exploits of individual local inhabitants against the foreign, English enemy. For example, various individuals are shown trying to save relics of the patron Saint Rumbold from the hands of the English heretics. The Carmelite friar Petrus de Wolf who had joined the armed resistance on the city square is shown in the first canvas participating in the action. In the second Petrus de Wolf can be seen after he has fallen in the hands of the enemy and is about to be killed by the English colonel Norreys.

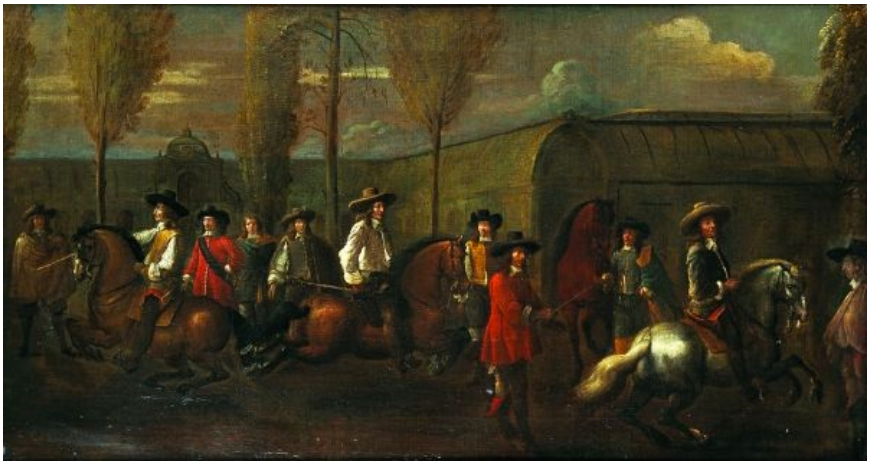
Riding School

Van Eyck was one of the many Antwerp painters who collaborated on a Cabinet of Pictures (Royal Collection, England) by Jacob de Formentrou. This painting dated between 1654 and 1659 represents an art gallery with works of important Antwerp masters and can be regarded as a carefully crafted advertisement of the current talent and past legacy of the Antwerp school of painting. The inclusion in the art gallery's collection of a work by van Eyck depicting an equestrian battle (the second-highest canvas on the right side of the right-hand wall) shows that he was at the time considered to be a leading painter in Antwerp.
