= De Waal (surname) =

De Waal is a Dutch surname with the literal translation "the Walloon". Originally it may have also referred to other southern, non-Germanic and French-speaking persons. A variant, archaic spelling is De Wael. Notable persons with that surname include:

De Waal

- Alex de Waal (born 1963), British social anthropologist and researcher on African issues
- Anastasia de Waal, British educationist
- André de Waal (born 1960), Dutch author, assistant professor, business owner and consultant
- Anna de Waal (1906–1981), Dutch politician
- Anton de Waal (1837–1917), German Christian archeologist and Roman Catholic church historian
- Edmund de Waal (born 1964), British ceramic artist
- Frans de Waal (1948–2024), Dutch ethologist
- Hugo de Waal (1935–2007) Bishop of Thetford, cousin of Victor
- Jan Hendrik de Waal Malefijt (1852–1931), Dutch Minister of Colonial Affairs
- Johan de Waal (born 1949), Namibian politician
- Kayla de Waal (born 11 June 2000), South African field hockey player
- Kit de Waal (born 1960) pseudonym of Irish/British writer Mandy O'Loughlin
- Pieter de Waal (1899–1977), South African military commander
- Nicolaas Frederic de Waal (1853–1932), Dutch Administrator of the Cape Province in South Africa
- Rein de Waal (1904–1985), Dutch field hockey player
- Simon de Waal (born 1961), Dutch script writer
- Thomas de Waal (born 1966), British journalist
- Victor de Waal (born 1929), British Anglican priest, father of Alex, Edmund and Thomas
- Willem de Waal (born 1978), South African rugby union footballer

De Wael / Dewael

- Cornelis de Wael (1592–1667), Flemish painter, engraver and merchant
- Jan de Wael I (1558–1633), Flemish painter and engraver, father of Cornelis and Lucas
- Jan Baptist de Wael (1632–1670s), Flemish painter and printmaker in Italy
- Johan de Wael (1594–1663), Dutch mayor of Haarlem portrayed by Frans Hals
- Leopold De Wael (1823–1892), Belgian merchant and mayor of Antwerp
- Lucas de Wael (1591–1661), Flemish painter, engraver and merchant
- Michiel de Wael (1596–1659), Dutch brewer portrayed by Frans Hals
- Monique De Wael (born 1937), Belgian-born American author of a fictitious Holocaust memoir
- Patrick Dewael (born 1955), Belgian politician, Minister-President of Flanders

== See also ==
- Henri van de Waal (1910–1972), Dutch writer and art historian
- Henk van der Waal (born 1960), Dutch poet
- Leen van der Waal (born 1928), Dutch engineer and politician
- Johannes Diderik van der Waals (1837–1923), Dutch theoretical physicist
