= Hamers =

Hamers is a surname. Notable people with the surname include:

- Franciscus Hamers (c. 1657/59 – after 1679), Flemish painter and draughtsman
- Loek Hamers (born 2000), Dutch footballer
- Melchior Hamers (1638–1709/10), Flemish painter, draughtsman, printmaker, and publisher
- Ralph Hamers (born 1966), Dutch businessman
- Raymond Hamers (1932–2021), Flemish scientist
