= Stefano Camogli =

Italian painter

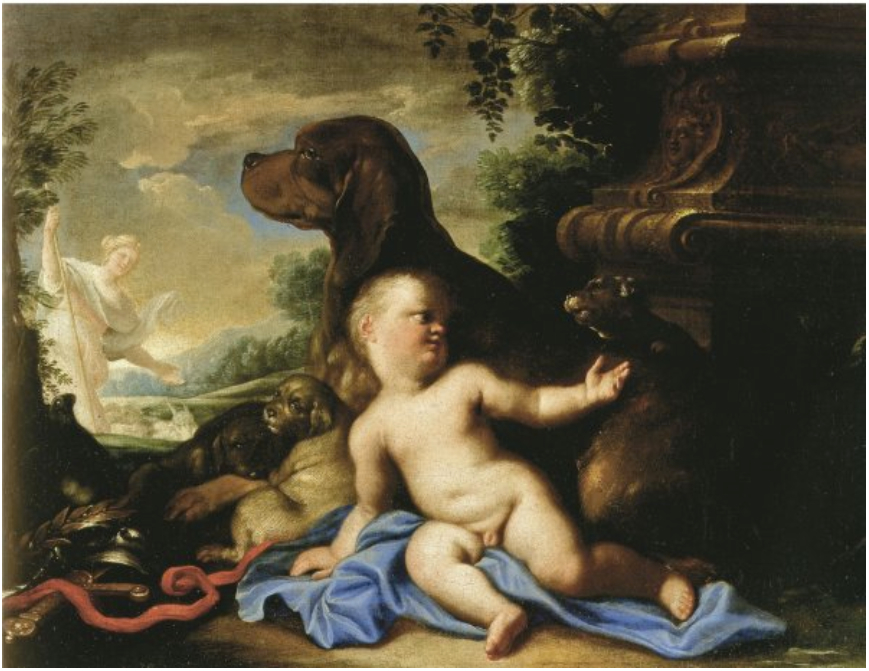
The discovery of Cyrus with the dog

Stefano Camogli, called 'Il Camoglino' (c. 1610 – 1690/1709) was a Baroque painter of still lifes, animals and market and pantry scenes. He also painted small history paintings. He was a regular collaborator of Domenico Piola who was his brother-in-law.

== Life ==
Little is known about Camogli’s early life. He was born in Genoa. His exact date of birth is not recorded. Camogli was an apprentice of Jan Roos, a Flemish painter who resided in Genoa where he had made a name for himself in and married a local woman. Jan Roos had been a pupil of Frans Snyders and specialized in still lifes and market scenes. Roos operated a large workshop where he had many assistants including Giacomo Legi, another Flemish still-life painter.

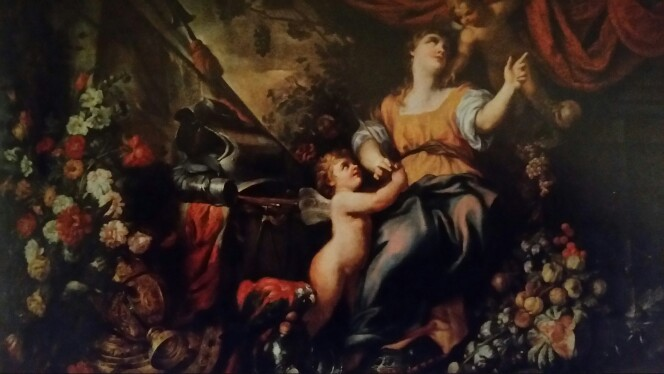
Allegory of peace and abundance

Genoa was at the time a thriving port city where a large number of potential patrons and collectors lived. There was a large colony of Flemish artists who resided in or passed through the city and relied on the network of established Flemish artists and traders to find patrons and commissions. These Flemish artists who included Anthony van Dyck had an important influence on the development of genre art in the city.

Camogli married Angiola Piola. He later became the first teacher of Domenico Piola who was 17 years his junior. Camogli and Domenico Piola became frequent collaborators on compositions.

He worked for aristocratic patrons as well as Englishmen on their Grand Tour. Camogli died in Genoa between 1690 and 1709.

== Work ==
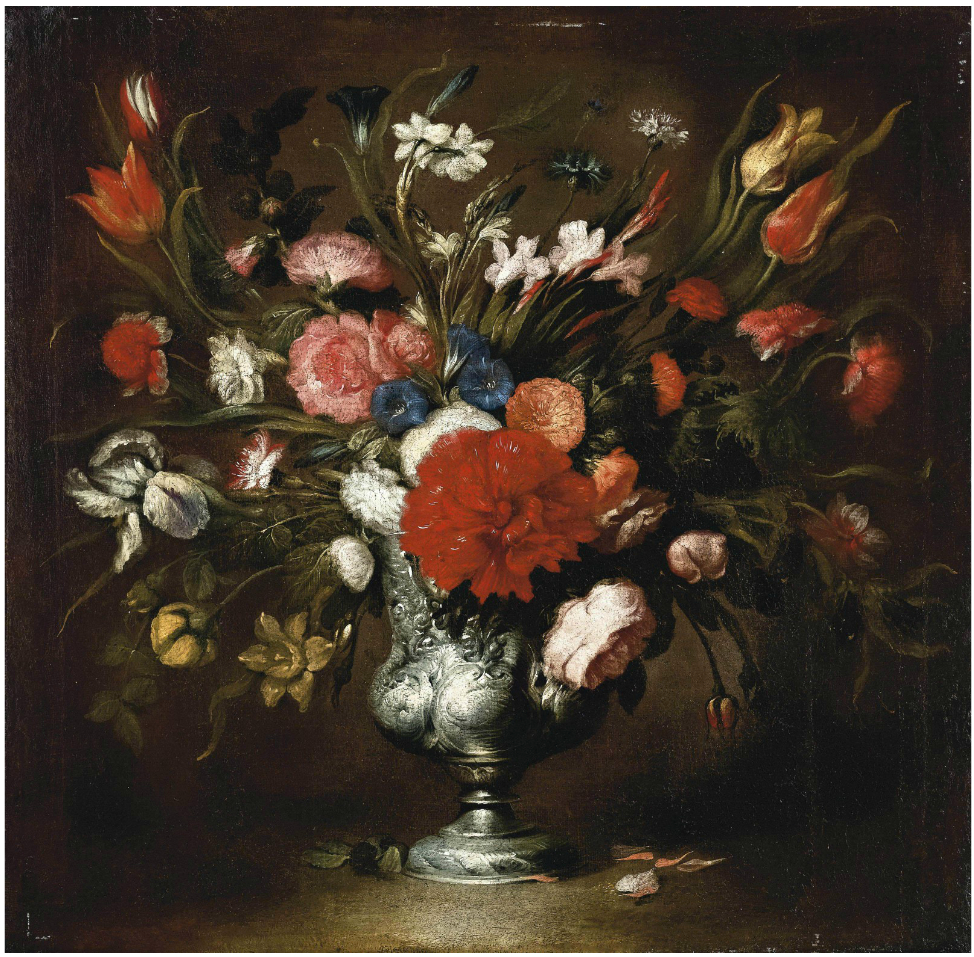
Flowerpot with peonies and irises

Stefano Camogli was a master of flower painting, still lifes of fruit and animals, which he depicted very truthfully. He also painted genre paintings of pantries and markets in a style inspired by his teacher Jan Roos. Like his master Roos, Camogli was also capable of painting the human figure as is shown in a set of history paintings attributed to him.

His works are characterized by their careful observation, brilliant color schemes, softness of touch and the minute attention to detail. He was particularly skilled in depicting animals in an expressive and realistic manner. He likely had access to the series of drawings of animals by the Italian animal painter Sinibaldo Scorza which was present in his brother in law Domenico Piola's workshop.

Camogli's work was also influenced by Giacomo Legi, another Flemish artist who also trained and worked in the Roos workshop in Genoa. Legi's work A market scene was cited directly in a composition referred to as The Market (Genoa private collection) executed by the young Domenico Piola with the collaboration of Stefano Camogli. Camogli and Piola were regular collaborators on compositions in which Camogli was responsible for the still life elements and Piola for the figures. Examples are the Allegory of Summer (Collection Torriglia Chiavari, Palazzo Rocca) and the Allegory of Peace and Abundance (Private collection). Camogli also collaborated as a flower and still life painter on compositions with his master Jan Roos, particularly in the 1630s.
