= Giacomo Legi =

Flemish painter (c. 1600–c. 1643)

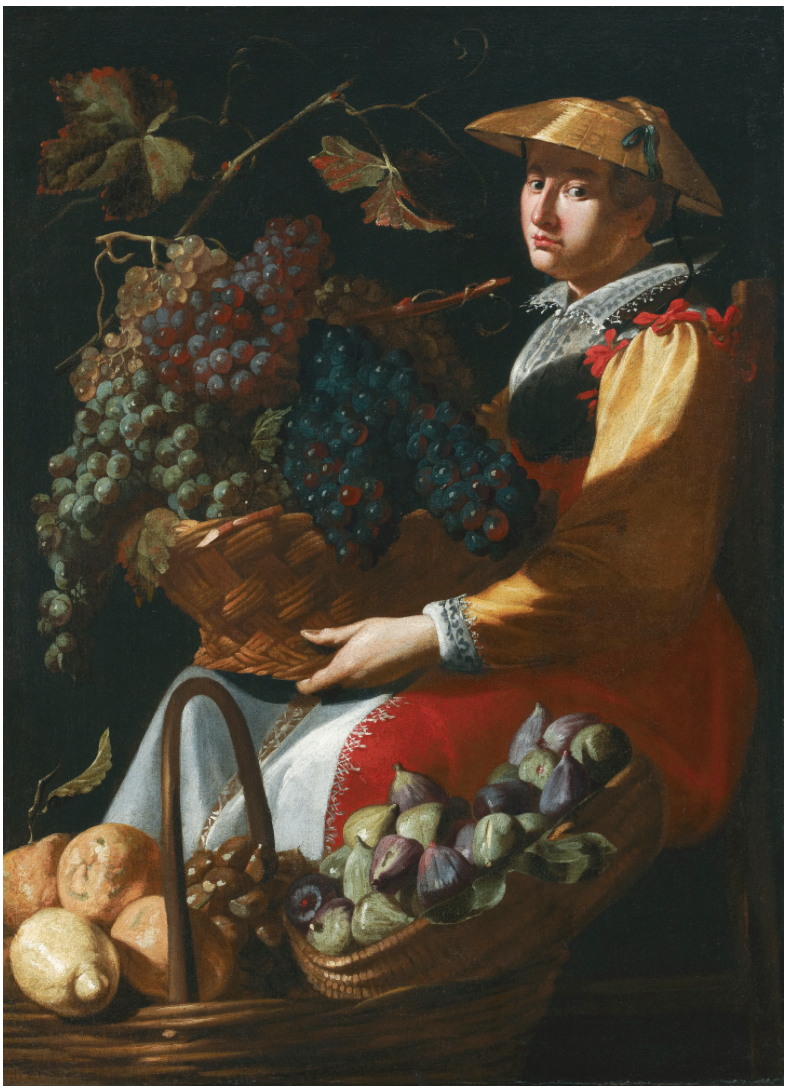
Lady selling fruit

Giacomo Legi (±1600, Liège, Prince-Bishopric of Liège or Antwerp - between 1640 and 1645, Milan) was a Baroque painter of Flemish descent who was active principally in northern Italy during the first half of the 17th century. Here he was one of the leading painters of still lifes and market and pantry scenes.

== Life ==
Little is known about Legi's early life. His original name is not known with certainty. It is possible that his Italian name is derived from the French word Liège which may refer to the city Liège or the Prince-Bishopric of Liège (Liegi in Italian), in present-day Belgium, where he may have been born. Antwerp has also been proposed as his possible place of birth.

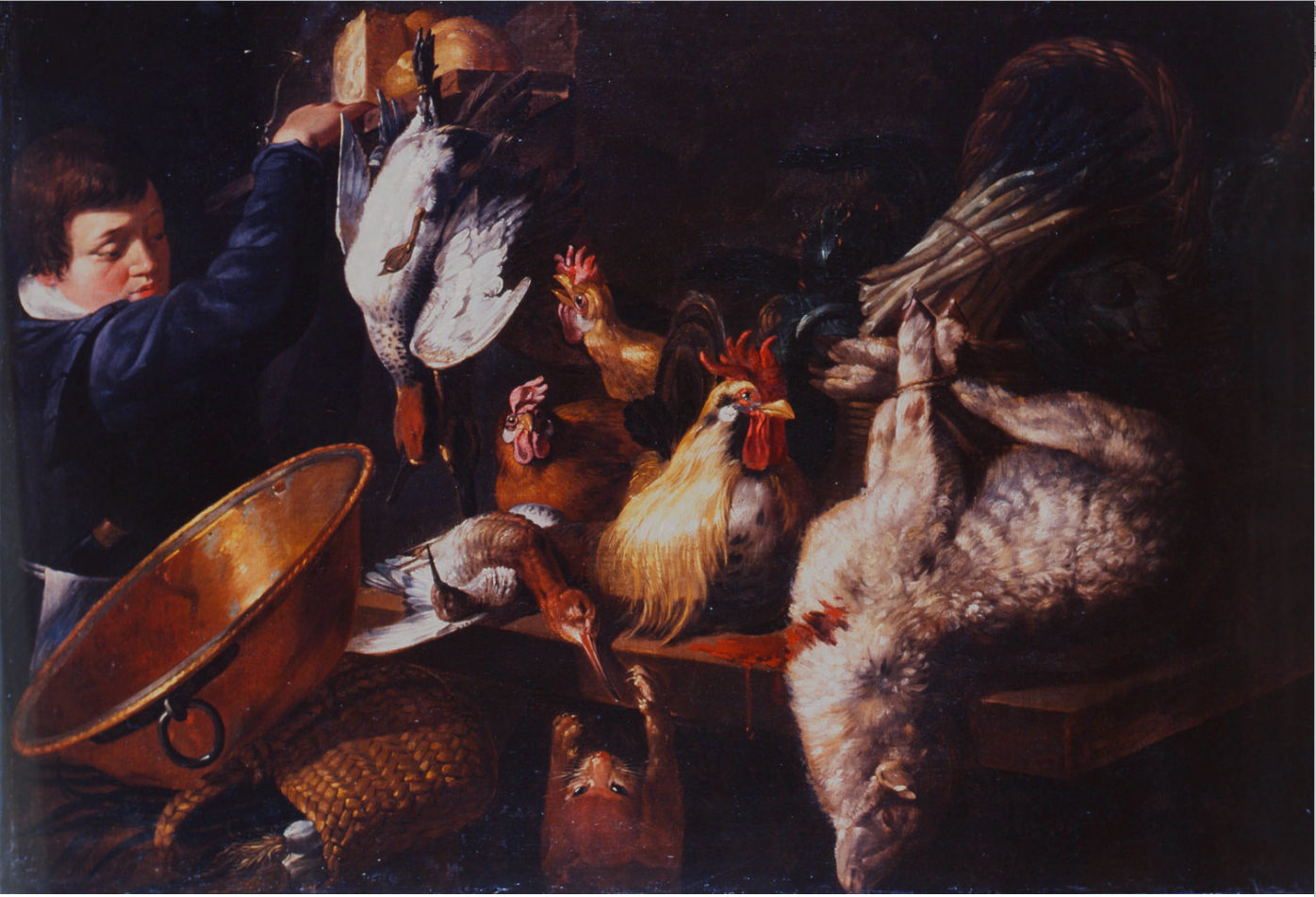
Pantry with a young man

Legi moved to Genoa to work as an apprentice in the large workshop of Jan Roos, a Flemish painter who had made a name for himself in Genoa and had married a local woman. Jan Roos specialized in still lifes and market scenes and may have been Legi's brother-in-law. Genoa was at the time an attractive destination for artists since the competition between artists there was less intense than in the leading cultural centres Rome, Florence and Venice, while Genoa was a thriving port city where a large number of potential customers and collectors lived. There was a large colony of Flemish artists who resided in or passed through the city and relied on the network of established Flemish artists and traders to find patrons and commissions.

In 1638 he moved to Milan to seek treatment of a head injury he suffered in his youth. Here he died some time between 1640 and 1645.

== Work ==
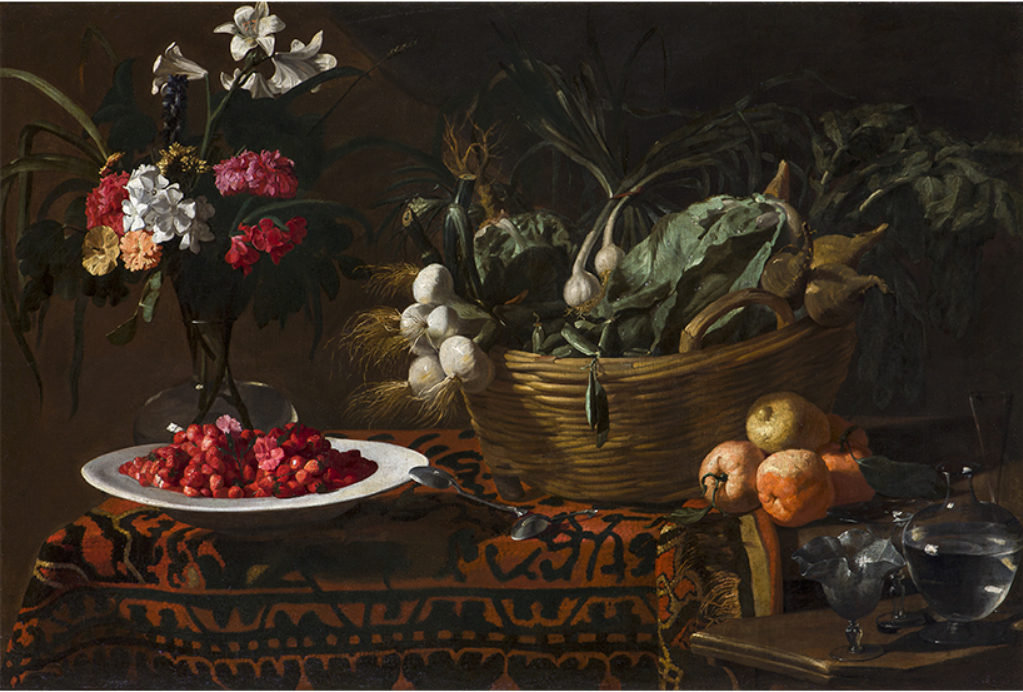
Basket with vegetables, plate of strawberries, vase of flowers and citrus fruits on table

Giacomo Legi was a master of the still life and of genre paintings and worked in a style inspired by his teacher Jan Roos. Roos and Legi played an important role in the development of the still life in Italy towards more complex compositions in line with Baroque taste. Legi made a career out of the depiction of single fruit, vegetable, game or fish salesmen and women.

It is difficult to determine the chronology of Legi's oeuvre as none of his works are dated. In his mature period his compositions became more elaborate and were characterized by an abundance of figures and details. Characteristic of his work are the rich brushstrokes, the vivid colors and the use of light, with clear chiaroscuro contrasts.

During his stay in Genoa, he collaborated with the local painter Domenico Fiasella. Legi's work was much admired and imitated by local painters in Genoa. Legi's A market scene was cited directly in a composition referred to as The Market (120 x 170 cm, Genoa private collection) executed by the young Domenico Piola with the collaboration of Stefano Camogli, who had also trained in the Roos workshop.

== Selected works ==
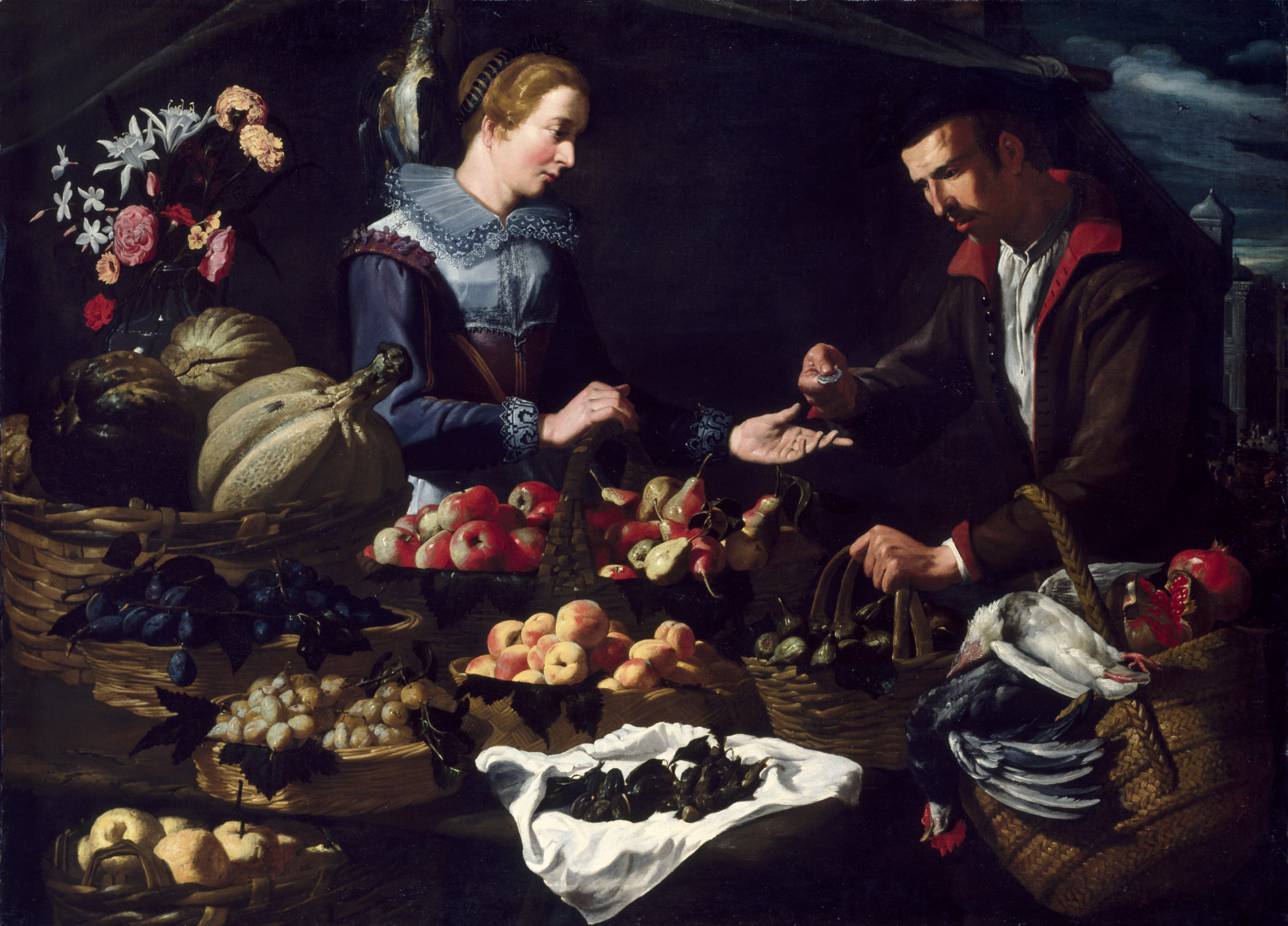
Fruit Market

- Market, Oil on canvas, 150x186 cm, Galleria di Palazzo Bianco, Genoa
- Kitchen, Oil on canvas, 150x186 cm, Palazzo Tursi, Genoa
- Pantry with live and dead animals with a young man, Oil on canvas, 99x147 cm, Musée des Beaux-Arts de Bordeaux, Bordeaux
- Pantry with animals, hanging ham, pans and cook, Oil on canvas, 112x142 cm, Musée des Beaux-Arts de Bordeaux, Bordeaux
- Pantry with animals, fruit, vegetables and a male character, Oil on canvas, Private Collection, Genoa
- The Fortune Teller, Oil on canvas, in collaboration with Domenico Fiasella, Albergo dei Poveri, Genoa
- Kitchen interior, oil on canvas, private collection
