= Jan Baptist de Wael =

Jan Baptist de Wael or Jan Baptist de Wael the Younger (1632-after 1669) was a Flemish painter and printmaker, who was principally active in Italy.

== Life ==
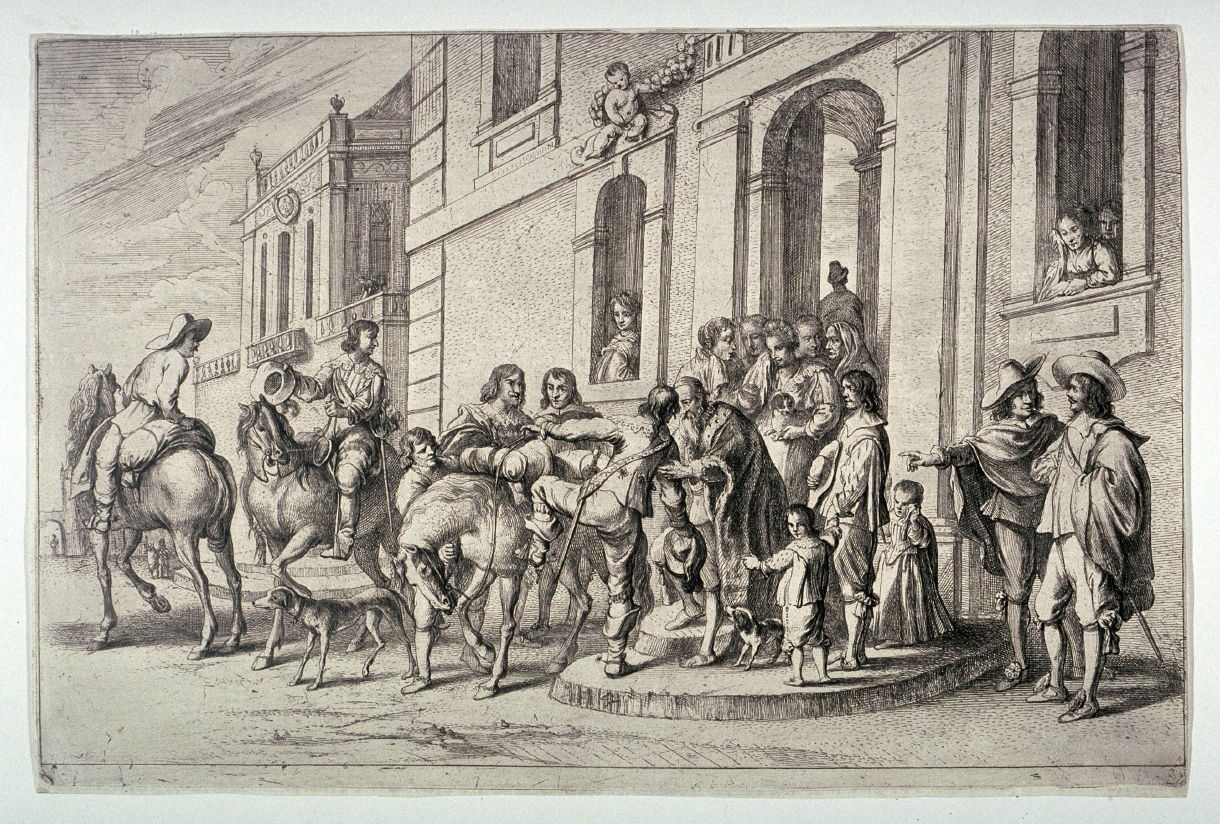
The Prodigal Son

Jan Baptist de Wael was born in a painting family in Antwerp. His grandfather was the painter Jan or Jan Baptist de Wael who had been included by Anthony van Dyck in his "Iconography" (Icones Principum Virorum), a collection of portraits of leading personalities in van Dyck's time. Jan Baptist the Younger's father was Lucas de Wael. Lucas de Wael was not only a painter and engraver but also a dealer in art and luxury goods and had spent years in Italy, in particular Genoa, with his brother Cornelis de Wael. After Lucas had returned to Antwerp, Lucas and Cornelis, who had remained in Genoa, established a lucrative business trading in art and luxury items between Italy and Flanders. In Genoa, Cornelis' workshop was the centre of the colony of Flemish artists who resided in or passed through the city. Cornelis assisted them with their local integration, passed on recommendations to clients and formulated competition rules. When Anthony van Dyck visited Genoa, he had stayed with the brothers and Cornelis was one of his closest collaborators in the city.

Jan Baptist de Wael travelled to Genoa in 1642 where he became a pupil of his uncle Cornelis. When his uncle moved to Rome around the year 1656 to avoid an outbreak of the plague in Genoa, Jan Baptist likely followed him as he was later recorded as a resident of Rome. Here he reportedly moved in the circle of the Bentvueghels, an association of mainly Dutch and Flemish artists working in Rome.

The exact time and place of his death are not known.

== Work ==
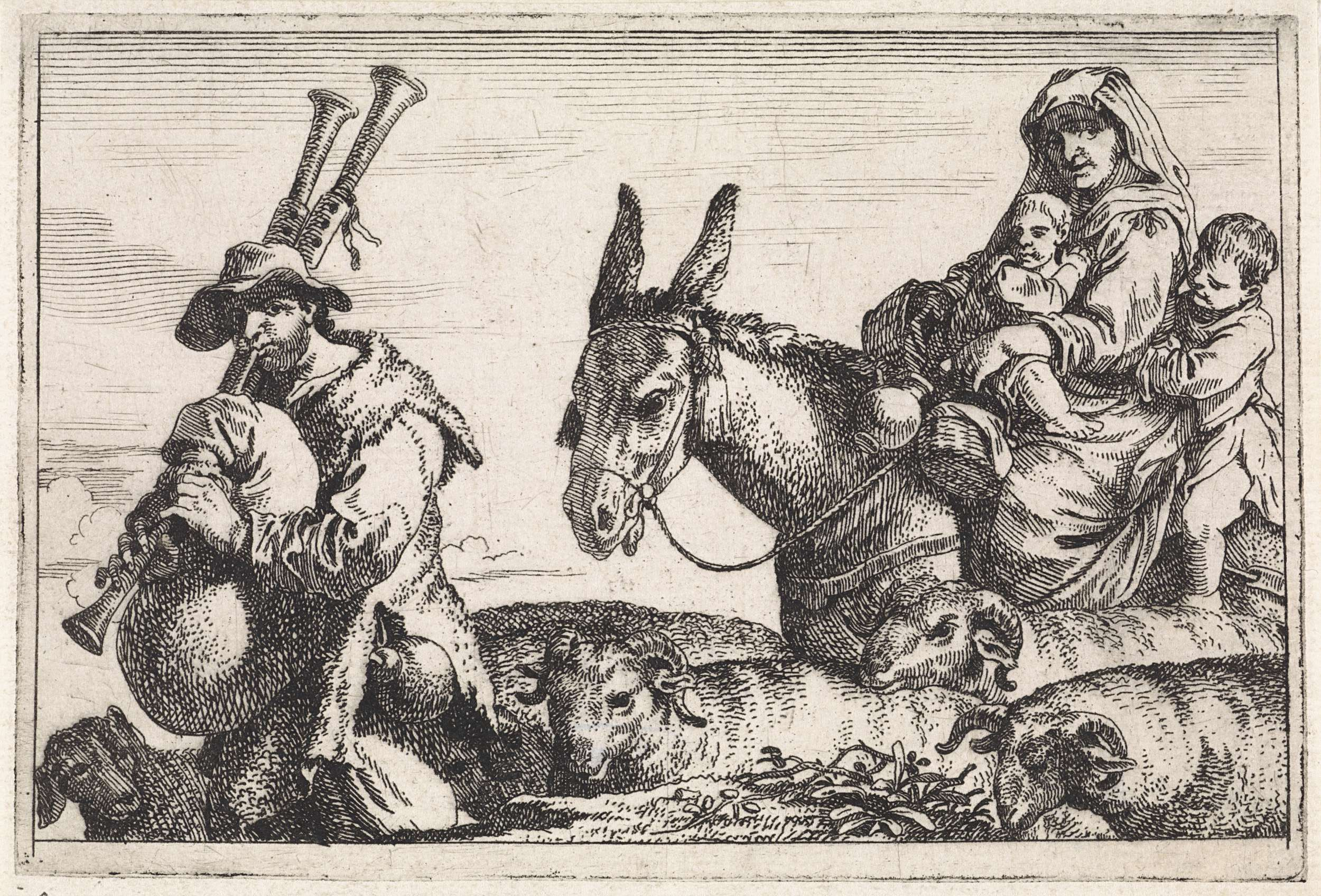
The Piper

Jan Baptist de Wael is known mostly for devotional and genre prints. Many of the religiously themed works were made after designs by his uncle Cornelis.

The only known painting that is attributed to him is a painting of The Virgin and Saint Rosalia of Palermo held in a private collection in Spain. This work shows the influence of Rubens as well as of Italian models.

The Rijksmuseum and the British Museum hold a number of his prints.
