= Jan Roos (painter) =

Flemish painter active in Genoa (1591–1638)

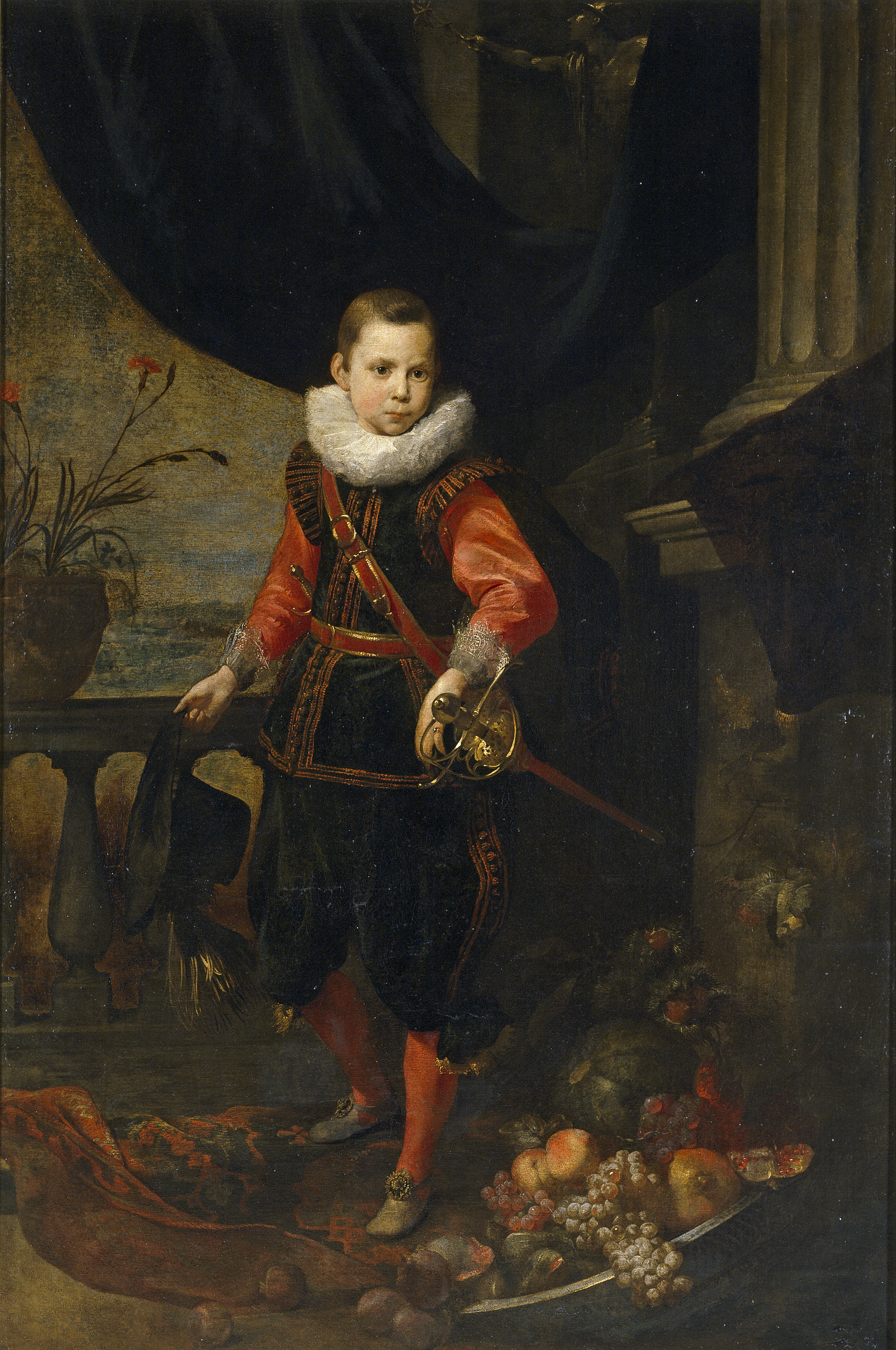
Portrait of a boy

Jan Roos (1591–1638) was a Flemish artist who, after training in his native Antwerp, mainly worked in Italy where he was called Giovanni Rosa. He was known for his still life paintings of flowers and vegetables, mythological and religious scenes and portraits. His style of still life painting had an important influence on the art of the local painters of the Genoese school.

== Life ==
Jan Roos was the son of a merchant. He studied painting with Jan de Wael from 1605. In 1610 he joined the workshop of Frans Snyders, the important still life and animal painter who had recently returned from Italy. There he acquired a mastery in painting still lifes and animals.

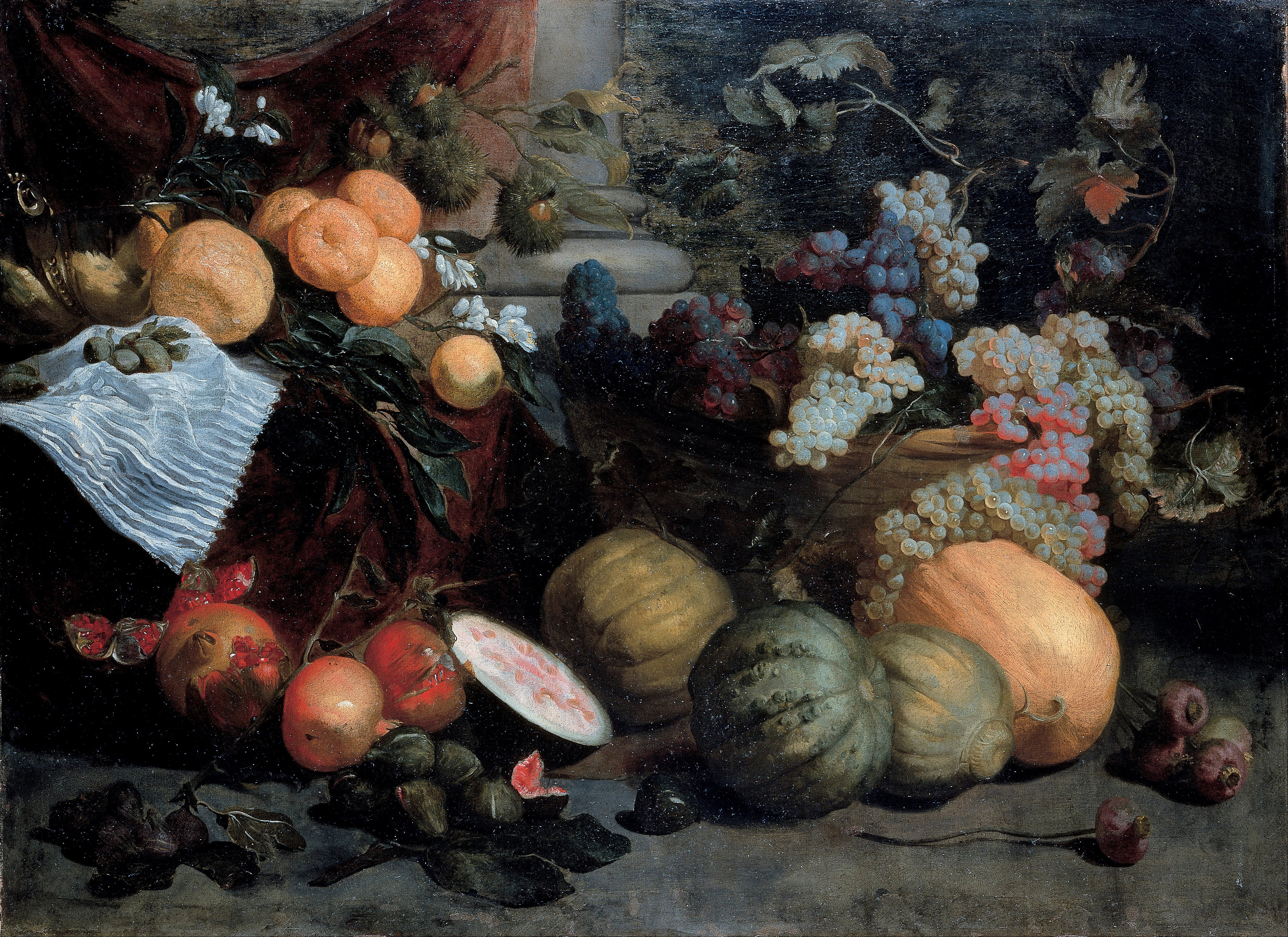
Still life with fruit and vegetables

In 1614, Roos travelled to Genoa and then on to Rome, where he stayed for almost two years. With the intention of returning to Antwerp, he traveled back in 1616 via Genoa. Given the high demand for his work in Genoa he decided not to continue his return journey and so he stayed in Genoa for the remainder of his life.

He married in Genoa with Benedetta Castagneto. He opened a workshop that became the busiest of the Flemish Genoese colony. His brother in law who is known only by his Italian name Giacomo Legi, but who was originally from Flanders, was a student in his workshop. It is possible that Roos was encouraged to seek his luck in Italy following in the steps of his first master Jan de Wael's two sons, Lucas (1591–1661) and Cornelis (1592–1667). Genoa was an attractive destination for artists since the competition between artists was less intense there than in Rome, Florence and Venice, while at the same time Genua was a wealthy city with a large number of potential customers and collectors.

Roos achieved considerable success as demonstrated by the presence of his name in a number of contemporary inventories. The artist remained in Genoa until his death in 1638.

== Works ==
Roos is best known for his still lifes but he also excelled in painting the human figure and portraits. He is also known for religious and mythological scenes. One of his favorite themes where large scale market scenes and still lives which revealed his debt to Frans Snyders. He adapted these compositions to appeal to the local taste.

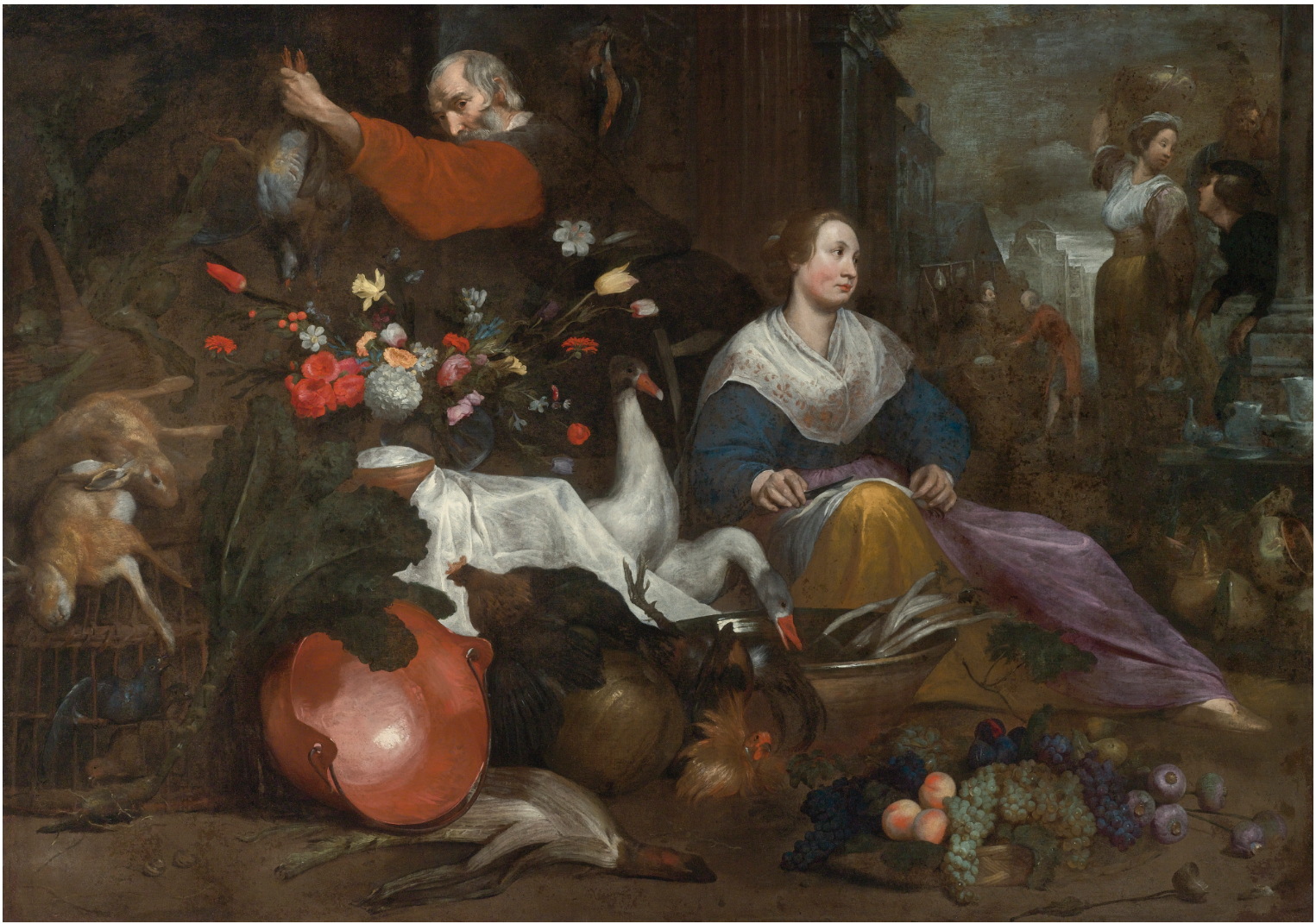
City market scene

The composition City market scene is an example of Roos' large scale market scenes. Roos reveals in this composition the techniques he acquired during his time in the studio of Frans Snyders for the naturalistic representation of animals, flowers, birds, insects and fruits. In the composition he also displays his remarkable ability to render a range of textures; the downy, white plumage of the geese; the shimmering surface of the beaten copper vessel; the frosted, translucent skin of the grapes; and the gnarled, waxy surface of the pumpkin; each rendered with lifelike precision. The muted palette of the background is interrupted by flashes of colour. Roos utilized in this composition certain devices to create a dialogue with the viewer. The bearded man looking out from the canvas over his shoulder leans over the stall, forming a diagonal echoed by the neck of the drinking goose and the extended leg of the young woman, which guides the beholder through the composition.

In addition to the work he produced as an independent artist, he collaborated with other artists. He is known to have collaborated regularly with Anthony van Dyck during the two periods that van Dyck stayed in Genoa (1621 and 1625–1627). Some see the brush of Roos in the still lifes that appear in van Dyck's Vertumnus and Pomona and in Diana and Endymion. The style of van Dyck influenced Roos' work as can be seen in the Portrait of a boy, now in the Museo del Prado. Some of Roos' works such as The holy family (Parochial church of Moltedo, Imperia) have in the past been attributed to van Dyck.

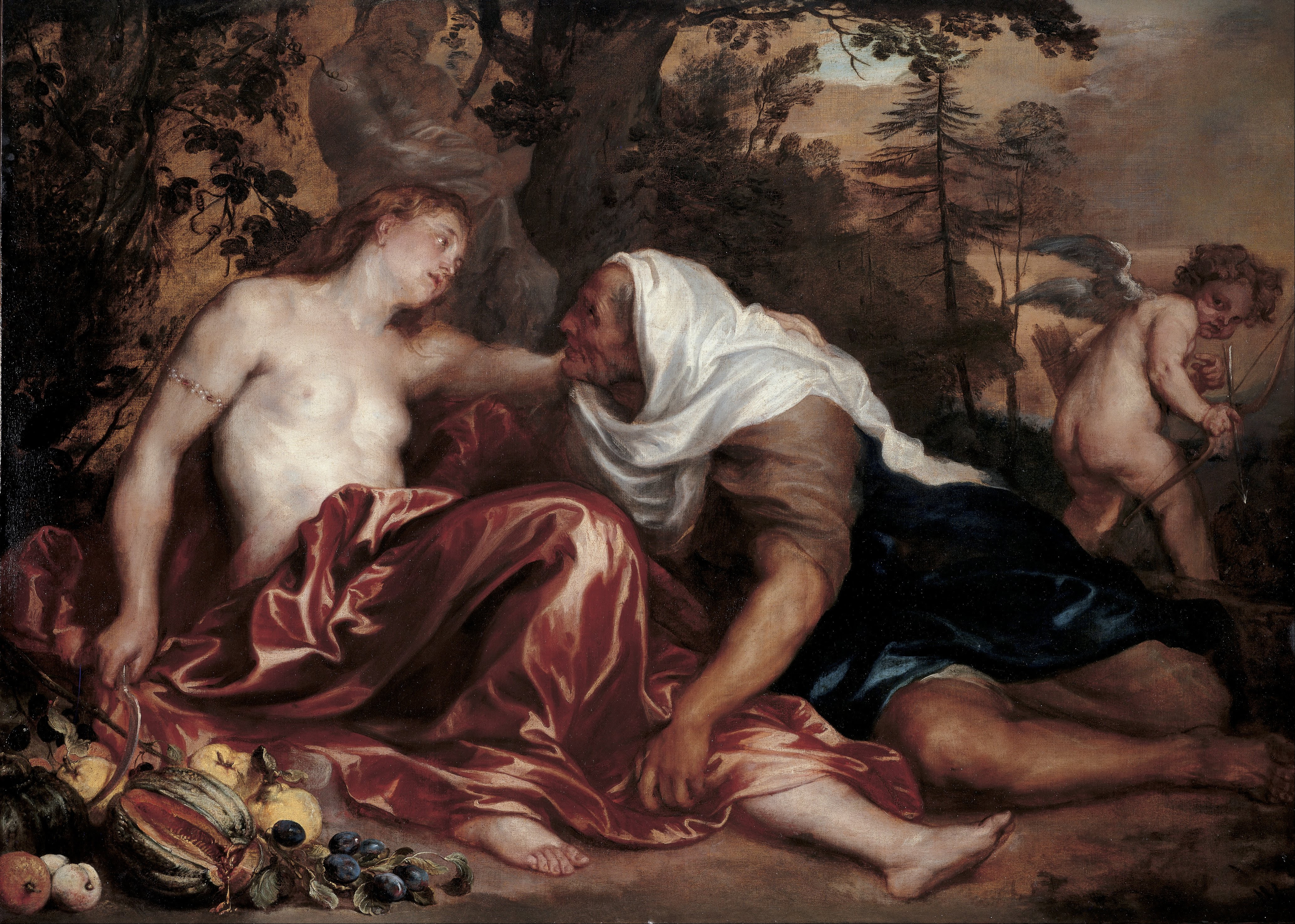
Vertumnus and Pomona, with Anthony van Dyck

His work had a major influence on the art of the local painters of the Genoese school. He was able to convince Giovanni Benedetto Castiglione to enliven his religious and mythological compositions with animal and still life elements. He also influenced the work of Sinibaldo Scorza, Stefano Camogli and Antonio Maria Vassallo.
