= Pellegrino Piola =

Italian painter (1617–1640)

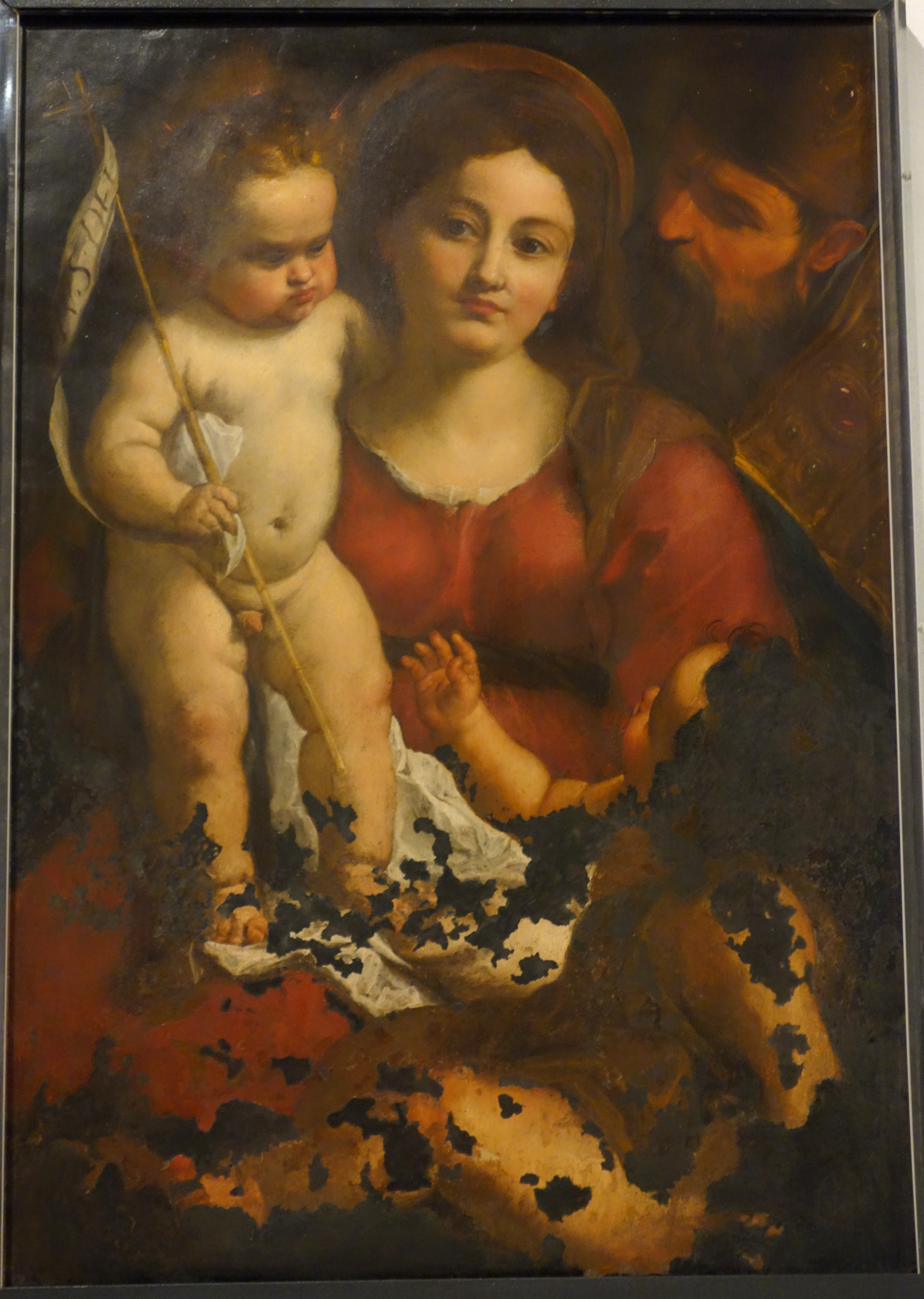
Madonna with Child, Saint John, and Saint Eligio Vescovo, by Pellegro Piola, 1640, oil on slate

Pellegrino Piola (1617 – 25 November 1640), also called Pellegro Piola or il Pellegro, was an Italian Baroque painter, active in Genoa.

He was born in Genoa, and at the age of twelve, apprenticed with Domenico and Giovanni Battista Capellino. He was the elder brother of the painter Domenico Piola. He was murdered during an altercation in Genoa; some claim by either his master or an elder painter envious of his skill.

== Sources ==
- Soprani, Raffaello (1769). Carlo Giuseppe Ratti (ed.). Delle vite de' pittori, scultori, ed architetti genovesi; Tomo secundo scritto da Carlo Giuseppe Ratti. Genoa: Stamperia Casamara. pp. 316–323.
- Baldinucci, Filippo (1728). Notizie de' Professori del Disegno, Da Cimabue in qua, Secolo V. dal 1610. al 1670. Distinto in Decennali (or Notice of the Professors of Design, from Cimabue to now, from 1610-1670). Stamperia S.A.R. per li Tartini, e Franchi (Googlebooks entry). pp. 85–86.
- Handbook for Travellers in Northern Italy: Comprising Piedmont, Liguria, Lombardy, Venetia John Murray (1860); p. 120.
