= Melchior Hamers =

Flemish painter

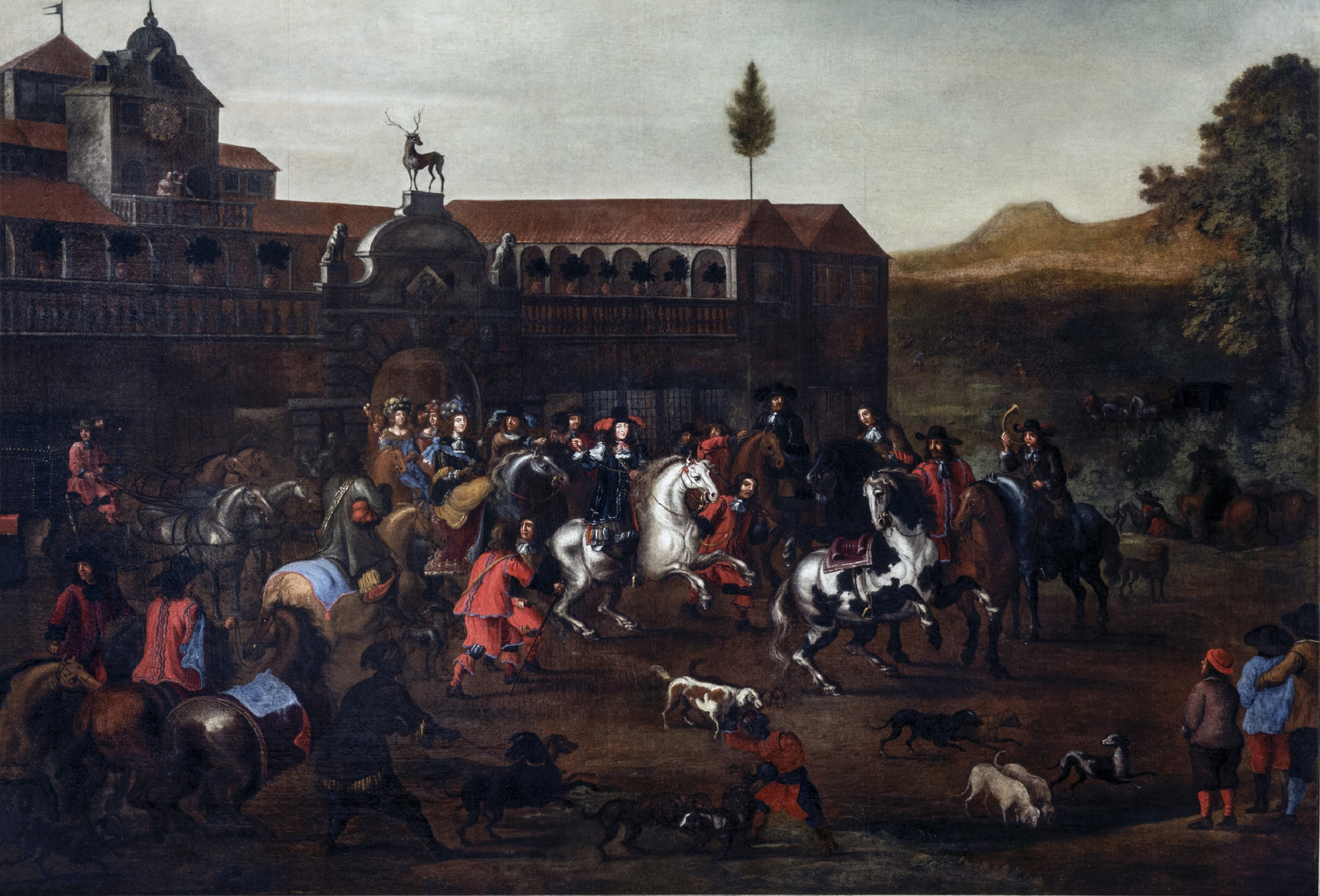
The Court's departure for the hunt from the Venaria Reale

Melchior Hamers (Antwerp, 26 January 1638 – Antwerp, 1709/10) was a Flemish painter, draughtsman, printmaker and publisher. He is known for his Italianate landscapes, scenes with hunters and battle scenes. He made a number of prints after designs by other artists, some of which he also published.

== Life ==
Hamers was born in Antwerp on 26 January 1638. He was registered as an apprentice of Willem van Herp in the Antwerp Guild of St. Luke in the guild year 1653–1654. He became a master in the Guild in the guild year 1657–1658. He may have travelled to Italy around 1668, as a fully signed painting, probably dated 1668, depicts the courtyard of the Palace of Venaria, a former royal residence and gardens located in Venaria Reale, near Turin in the Piedmont region in northern Italy. It is possible that this painting was made on site, which would imply that he was then likely in the employ of the Royal House of Savoy who owned the Venaria.

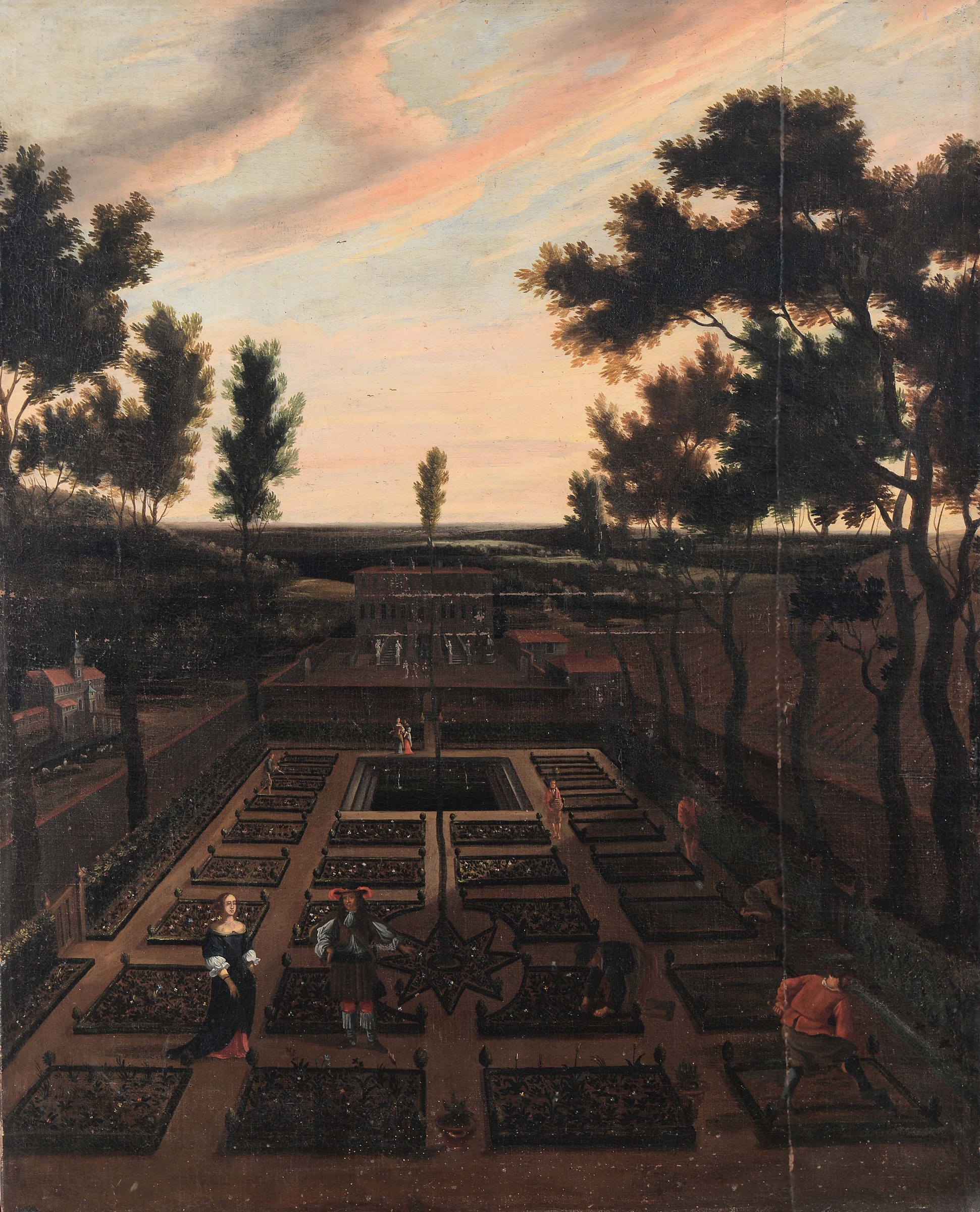
Landscape with figures tending a garden

He was a Capiteyn (captain) of the Antwerp civil militia, a so-called schutterij. He married Isabella Johanna van den Perre. He and his wife made their will on 20 April 1675. On 11 June 1677 he and Franchois Bodeloo are recorded as acting as the guardians of Jan van Meurs. On 3 January 1678 he entered into a contract to take on as apprenticeship Jan Baptist de Bie, the son of the painter Erasmus de Bie.

The Guild records state that the death dues of the wife of Capiteyn Hamers were paid in the guild year 1678–1679. This indicates that she died in or before 1679. It is not clear from the records whether Capiteyn Hamers was a reference to Melchior Hamers or to another painter called Franciscus Hamers who may also have been a captain in the local militia. His wife died definitely before 1682, the year in which her estate was settled. Hamers married Catharina Basseliers, the widow of the marine painter Jan Peeters the Elder on 19 May 1682. She died in 1690.

He must have died in 1709 or 1710 as his death duties were paid to the Guild between 18 September 1709 and 18 September 1710.

== Work ==
Hamers' subject matter is mainly Italianate landscapes, scenes with hunters and battle scenes. Notable are his scenes of the hunts of the Dukes of Savoy departing from and returning to the Palace of Venaria.

He is believed to have engraved some plates of two series of prints after designs by Cornelis de Wael, one on the five senses and one on the four seasons. Hamers and Willem Peeters were the principal engravers for these sets, which were published in Antwerp by Alexander Voet the Elder.
