= Lucas de Wael =

Flemish painter

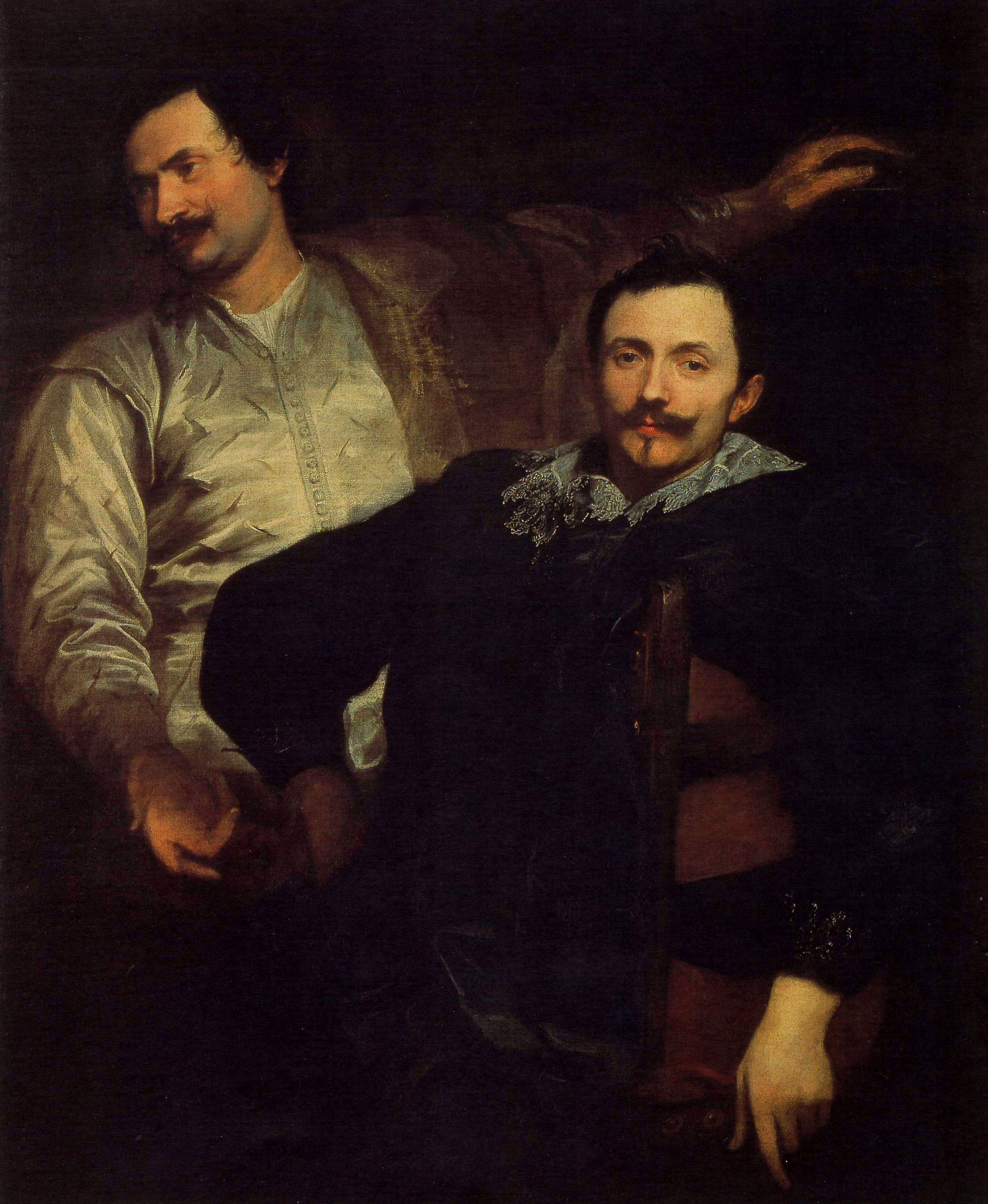
- Lucas and Cornelis de Wael by van Dyck
- Born: Lucas de Wael; 3 March 1591, Antwerp
- Died: 25 October 1661 (aged 70), Antwerp
- Known for: Painting, Engraving

Lucas de Wael (3 March 1591 – 25 October 1661) was a Flemish painter, art dealer and merchant. He was born in Antwerp and worked for some time in Genoa in Italy before returning to Antwerp. Here he continued his artistic and commercial activities. He is known for his landscapes and genre scenes.

== Life ==
Lucas de Wael was born into an artistic family in Antwerp as the son of the painter Jan de Wael I (1558–1633). His mother Gertrude de Jode came from a family of artists: her father was the cartographer Gerard de Jode and her brother was the engraver Peter de Jode I. Although his date of birth has traditionally been given as 3 March 1591 he was baptized 7 September 1591, which may indicate he was born closer to the latter date. He first studied with his father and was then likely a pupil of Jan Brueghel the Elder.

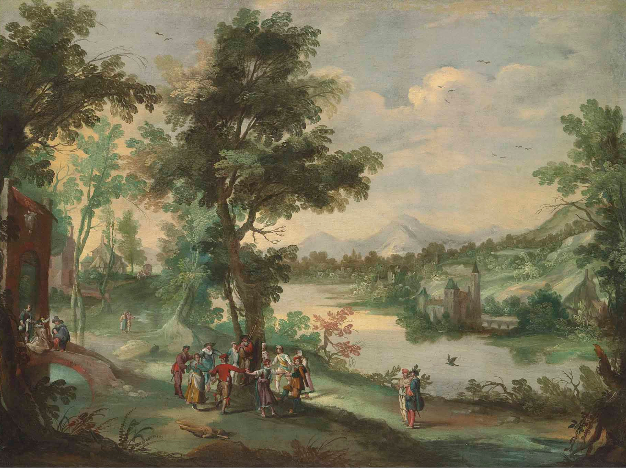
Extensive wooded landscape with villagers dancing and making music by a river

Lucas possibly travelled to France and Italy at a young age. During this trip he may have stayed in Paris and in Venice with his uncle Ferdinand van den Eynden, an art collector, art dealer and merchant residing in Venice at the time. His younger brother, Cornelis de Wael (1592–1672), accompanied him when he travelled to Italy likely around 1619. They spent time first in Genoa and then in Rome where they came into contact with the members of the Bentvueghels, an association of mainly Dutch and Flemish artists working in Rome. The brothers likely did not become members of the Bentvueghels. In 1627 Cornelis became a member of the Accademia di San Luca, the prestigious association of artists in Rome which had very strict admission criteria.

Genoa was at the time an attractive destination for artists since the competition between artists there was less intense than in the leading cultural centres Rome, Florence and Venice, while Genoa was a thriving port city where a large number of potential customers and collectors lived.

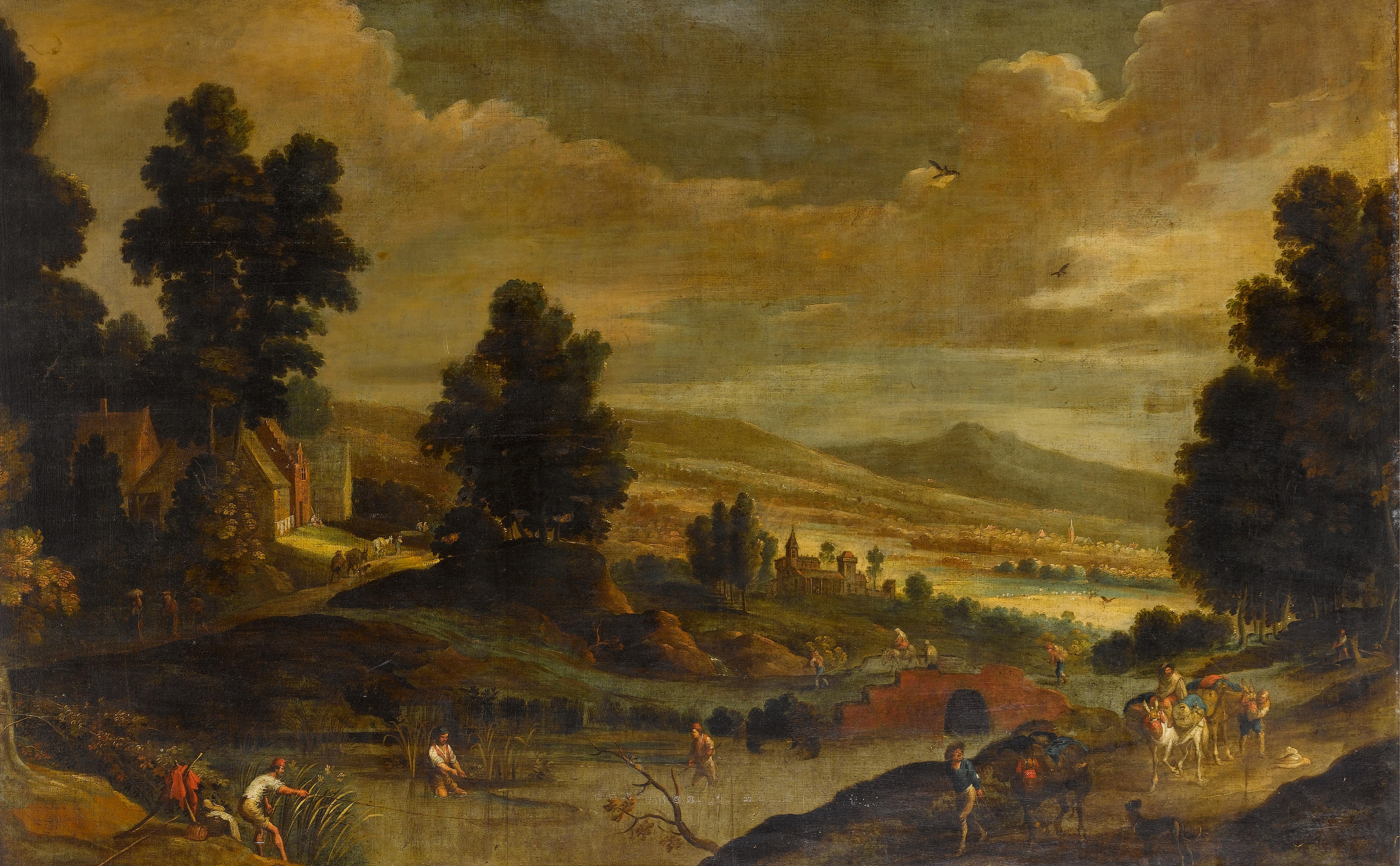
River landscape with fishermen and travellers, collaboration between Lucas and Cornelis de Wael

The workshop of the brothers de Wael in Genoa became the centre of the colony of Flemish artists who resided in or passed through the city. These Flemish artists could take advantage of the work and artistic activity that their workshop attracted. The brothers provided a home, materials and tools, they assisted their compatriots with their local integration, passed on recommendations to clients and formulated competition rules. Some Flemish artists visiting Genoa became their collaborators. This is the case of the marine painter Andries van Eertvelt who is documented in Genoa from 1628 to 1630, where he lived with de Wael and became his collaborator. When Anthony van Dyck visited Genoa, he stayed with the brothers. While it was formerly believed that Cornelis was one of van Dyck's closest collaborators in the city, recent scholarship has suggested that it is more likely that this role was played by the Flemish painter Jan Roos whom van Dyck got to know through the de Wael workshop. Van Dyck painted a Portrait of the brothers de Wael (Pinacoteca Capitolina, Rome) that was later engraved by Wenceslas Hollar. The Flemish painter Jan Brueghel the Younger stayed with the brothers de Wael in Genoa from October until December 1622.

The brothers were also involved in trading activities with their hometown dealing in a wide variety of goods. Lucas returned to Antwerp in 1628. He was registered in the records of the Antwerp Guild of Saint Luke as a landscape painter in the guild year 1627–1628. He continued to play a major role in the business activities of his brother Cornelis who resided for the remainder of his life in Italy. In Antwerp he also painted and dealt in art. He lived first with his father at the Lombaerdenvest and later in the St. Antoniusstraat and Steenhouwersvest. In 1648 he made a trip to Genoa where his brother was then still residing.

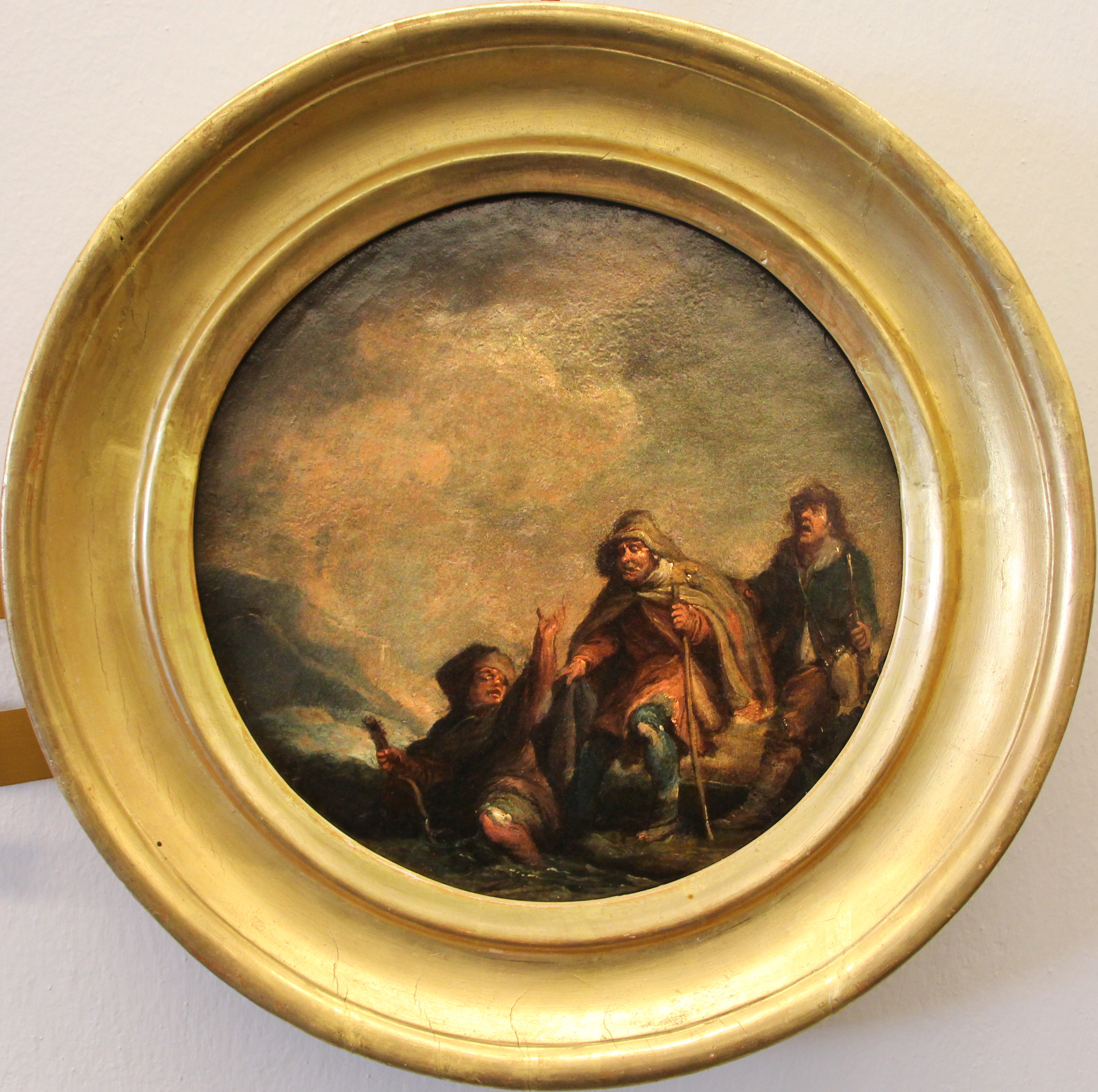
Beggars, Palazzo Bianco, Genoa

Lucas was the father of Anton and Jan Baptist de Wael. Lucas' son Jan Baptist later traveled to Genoa to study with his uncle Cornelis.

== Work ==
Lucas was mainly a painter of landscapes, vedute and genre scenes. Most of his work consists of landscapes and port scenes with ships. Only one signed work of his has been found, which makes attribution difficult.

In many of Lucas' paintings his brother Cornelis added the figures while, in turn, Lucas painted the landscapes in Cornelis' battle scenes and harbour views. The View of a Roman square (At Minerva Auctions sale in Rome on 26 May 2016, lot 97) and the River landscape with fishermen and travellers (At Bonhams on 9 July 2008 in London, lot 38) have been attributed to the brothers. Lucas also collaborated with Jan Brueghel the Younger on paintings of landscapes with figures for which Lucas created the landscape part and Brueghel the figures.
