= Domenico Piola =

Italian painter

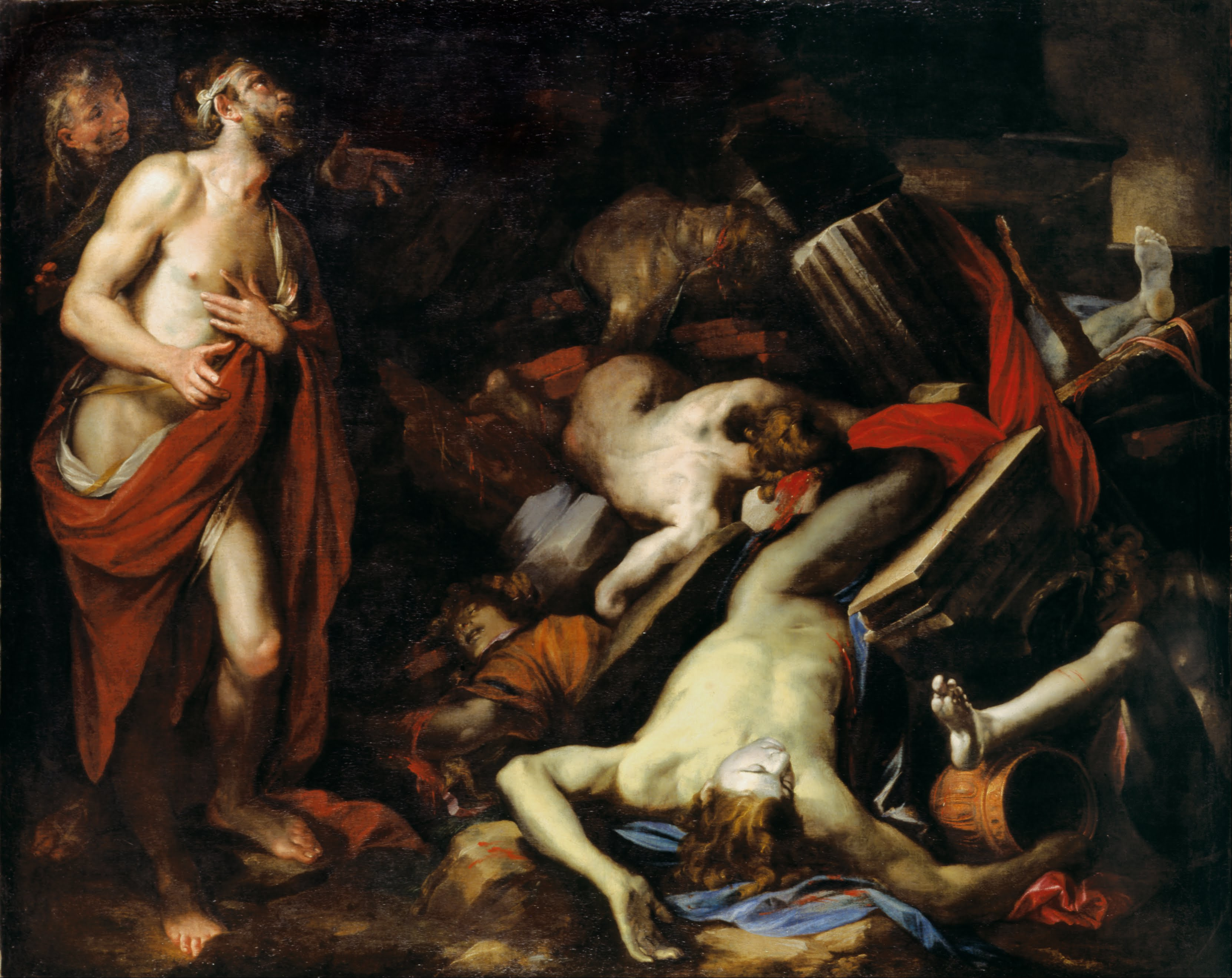
Job and his children

Domenico Piola (1627 – 8 April 1703) was a Genoese painter of the Baroque period. He was the leading artist in Genoa in the second half of the 17th century, working on ceiling frescoes for many Genoese churches and palaces and canvas paintings for private collectors. His family studio was highly prolific and frequently collaborated with other artists.

== Biography ==
Piola was an Italian painter, draughtsman, printmaker and designer. He was the leading artist in Genoa in the second half of the 17th century, working for both public and private collectors. His first teacher was his 17-year older brother-in-law Stefano Camogli. Piola was further trained by his older brother Pellegro and then studied under Pellegro's teacher, Giovanni Domenico Cappellino (1580–1651).

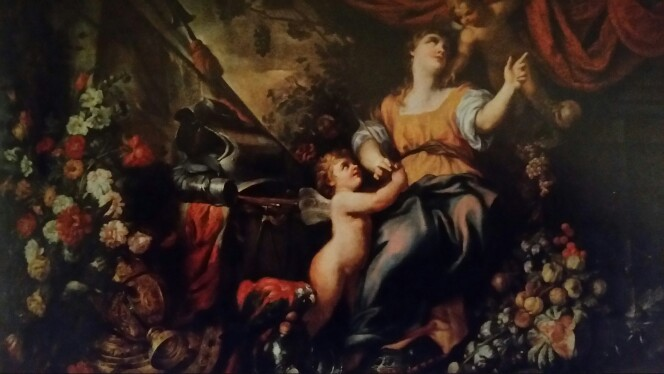
Allegory of peace and abundance, with Stefano Camogli

From 1650 onwards, the Piola family played a dominant role in the decoration of Genoese ceilings for nearly a century. While Domenico was the key figure in the family studio, known as Casa Piola, in the second half of the 17th century, other members were Piola's younger brother, his brother-in-law Stefano Camogli, his three sons, and his two sons-in-law. The studio streamlined the design and production of decorated ceilings. The studio also produced designs for sculptors and for craftsmen in wood, ceramics and metalwork.

In 1684–5 Domenico visited Milan, Piacenza, Bologna and Asti. At Piacenza, he painted decorations in the Casa Baldini. In Genoa in 1688, he and Gregorio de’ Ferrari began to decorate rooms in the Palazzo Rosso on the theme of the four seasons, Piola executing Autumn and Winter and Ferrari the more lyrical Spring and Summer. Preparatory drawings for Winter survive in (Genoa, Palazzo Rosso; London, British Museum).

== Works ==
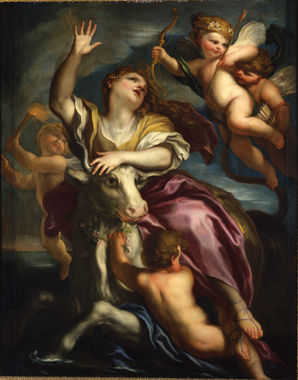
The Rape of Europa

Piola's early copies after Giovanni Benedetto Castiglione and his working relationship with Valerio Castello in the late 1640s and early 1650s encouraged the development of a more Baroque style. Piola absorbed Castiglione's work, as is visible in The Communion of Clare of Montefalco (London, British Museum) and his paintings in the Oratory of St John the Baptist at Spotorno. Piola's style was fully matured by 1670. The influence of Parmese art was strengthened after the return of Gregorio de’ Ferrari from Parma circa 1672. Correggio’s style encouraged Piola's own predilection for diagonal movement, bright colours and strongly foreshortened figures. In 1674 Ferrari married Piola's daughter. The work of the Casa Piola was considerably augmented. In the 1670s and 1680s, the two artists collaborated on many fresco projects. In 1684 Piola began to fresco the choir of San Leonardo and two rooms in the Villa Gropallo at Zerbino; all work was interrupted in this year after a French bombardment destroyed much of Genoa, including Domenico's house and studio.

Piola also often collaborated with his brother-in-law Stefano Camogli, a specialist still life and animal painter. Examples of compositions in which Camogli was responsible for the still life elements and Piola for the figures are the Allegory of Summer (Collection Torriglia Chiavari, Palazzo Rocca) and the Allegory of Peace and Abundance (Private collection).

== Casa Piola through the ages ==
Other members of the Piola family who were artists included Domenico's brother, Giovanni Andrea and his three sons Paolo Gerolamo, Anton Maria, and Giovanni Battista; his two sons-in-law, Gregorio de’ Ferrari (his most distinguished pupil and married to his daughter Margherita Piola) and Domenico Parodi; and his brother-in-law Stefano Camogli. The large family studio, called Casa Piola, excelled in both quadratura fresco decoration and canvases. Generations of artists, down to the 20th century, descended from the line of Piola-De Ferrari, including Giovanni Maria De Simoni, who died in 1913 in the original residence of Domenico's family.

== Public collections ==
Piola is represented in the following collections: Museo dell'Accademia Ligustica di Belle Arti, Genoa; Palazzo Bianco, Genoa; Palazzo Rosso Gallery, Genoa; Drawings from the Biblioteca Ambrosiana, Milan; The Royal Collection, London; Courtauld Institute of Art, London; J. Paul Getty Museum, Los Angeles; Fine Arts Museums of San Francisco; Hermitage Museum, Saint Petersburg, amongst others.
