= Franciscus Hamers =

Flemish painter

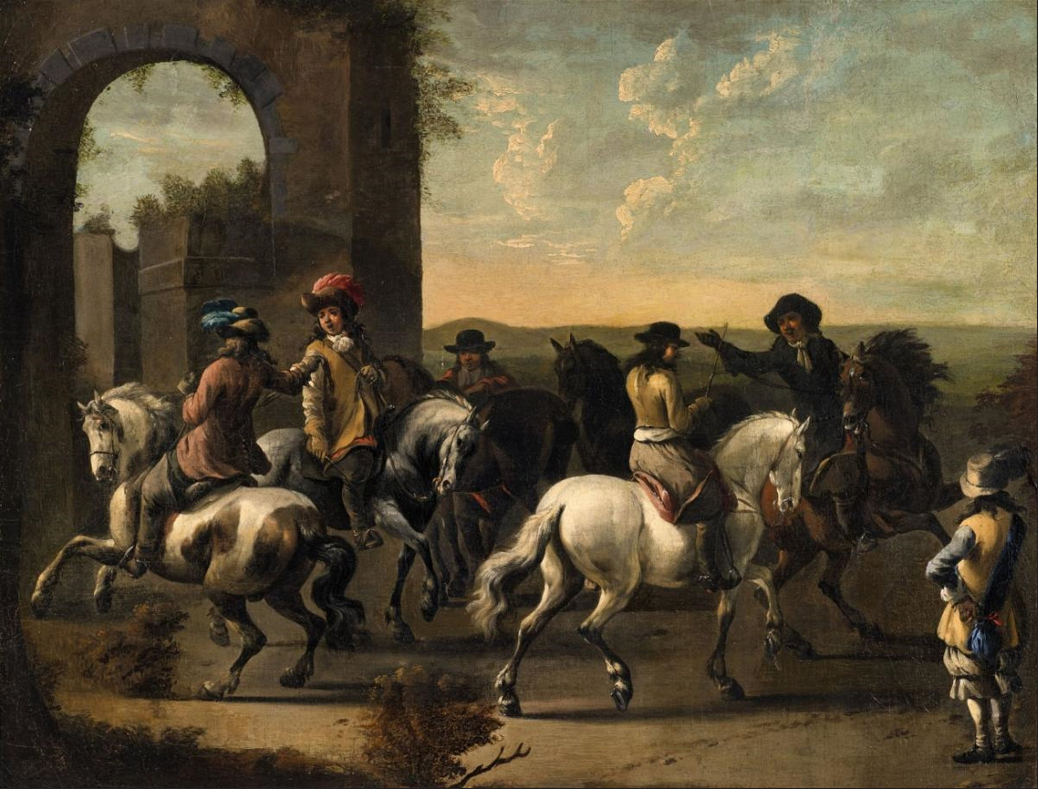
Southern landscape with riders

Franciscus Hamers or Frans Hamers (Antwerp, c. 1657/59 – Antwerp, after 1679) was a Flemish painter and draughtsman. He is known for his Italianate landscapes with hunters. Due to their closeness to the work of the Flemish painter Simon Johannes van Douw, his work was initially attributed to an anonymous artist who was given the notname Pseudo-Van Douw.

== Life ==
Very little is known about Hamers. He was likely born in Antwerp around 1657/1659. He was admitted as a master in the Antwerp Guild of St. Luke in the guild year 1673–1674. He may possibly be identified with the person referred to in the Guild register as Capiteyn Hamers. The fact that he was referred to as Capiteyn (captain) likely means that he was a member of the Antwerp civil militia, a so-called schutterij. His identification with Capiteyn Hamers is not conclusive as there was another Antwerp painter by the name of Melchior Hamers who was also a captain of the militia and the reference in the guild records may have been to this artist.

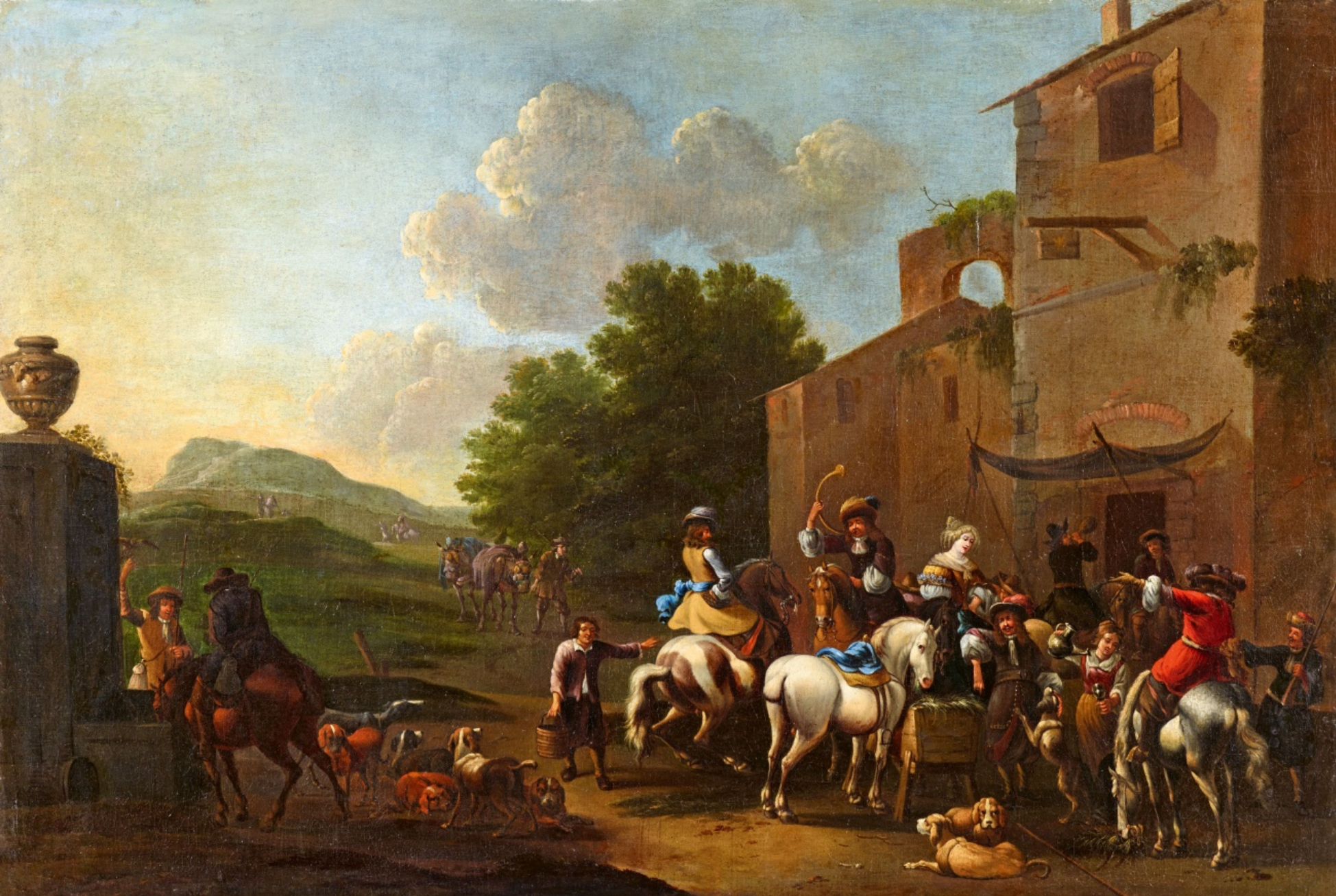
Departure for the hunt

The wife of Capiteyn Hamers died in or before 1679 as her death dues were paid to the Guild in the guild year 1678–1679. As there are no further records about the artist in the guild records and if he can be identified with Capiteyn Hamers, then he must have died after the entry regarding the death of his wife.

== Work ==
Franciscus Hamers' work has only recently been rediscovered. In 1987 a painting with an illegible signature was shown by an art dealer at the Netherlands Institute for Art History. A small number of works with a similar style and subject matter were later grouped together by art historian Marijke de Kinkelder under the provisional notname 'Pseudo-Van Douw'. This name was chosen as these works were close to the output of the Flemish painter Simon Johannes van Douw who painted Italianizing landscapes, cattle markets and hunting scenes in a style, which showed the influence of the Dutch painter Philips Wouwermans. In spring 2002 a painting with a signature similar to that of the painting shown in 1987 was with an art dealer in Paris. This time the signature could be deciphered and it was possible to identify the artist as Franciscus Hamers, who had only been known until that time as a master registered at the guild in the guild year I674/75. Subsequently, more paintings were attributed to him either on stylistic grounds or by identifying his characteristic signature.

Hamers' artistic activity can best be characterised at that of a 'dozijnschilder' (literally 'dozen painter'), the name given to Antwerp painters in the 1670s who due to the economic downturn caused by the French invasions, created works for the market which imitated, borrowed from and copied other artists. In particular works of notably Dutch painters such as Philips Wouwerman, Pieter van Laer and Nicolaes Pietersz. Berchem were often the inspiration for these artists due to the market demand for battle and hunting scenes at the time. These works were produced in large quantities and distributed internationally to France, Austria, Spain and Portugal through art-dealers such as Guillam Forchondt and Bartholomeus Floquet.

Hamers' subject matter is mainly Italianate landscapes with hunters.
