= Cornelis de Wael =

Flemish painter (1592–1667)

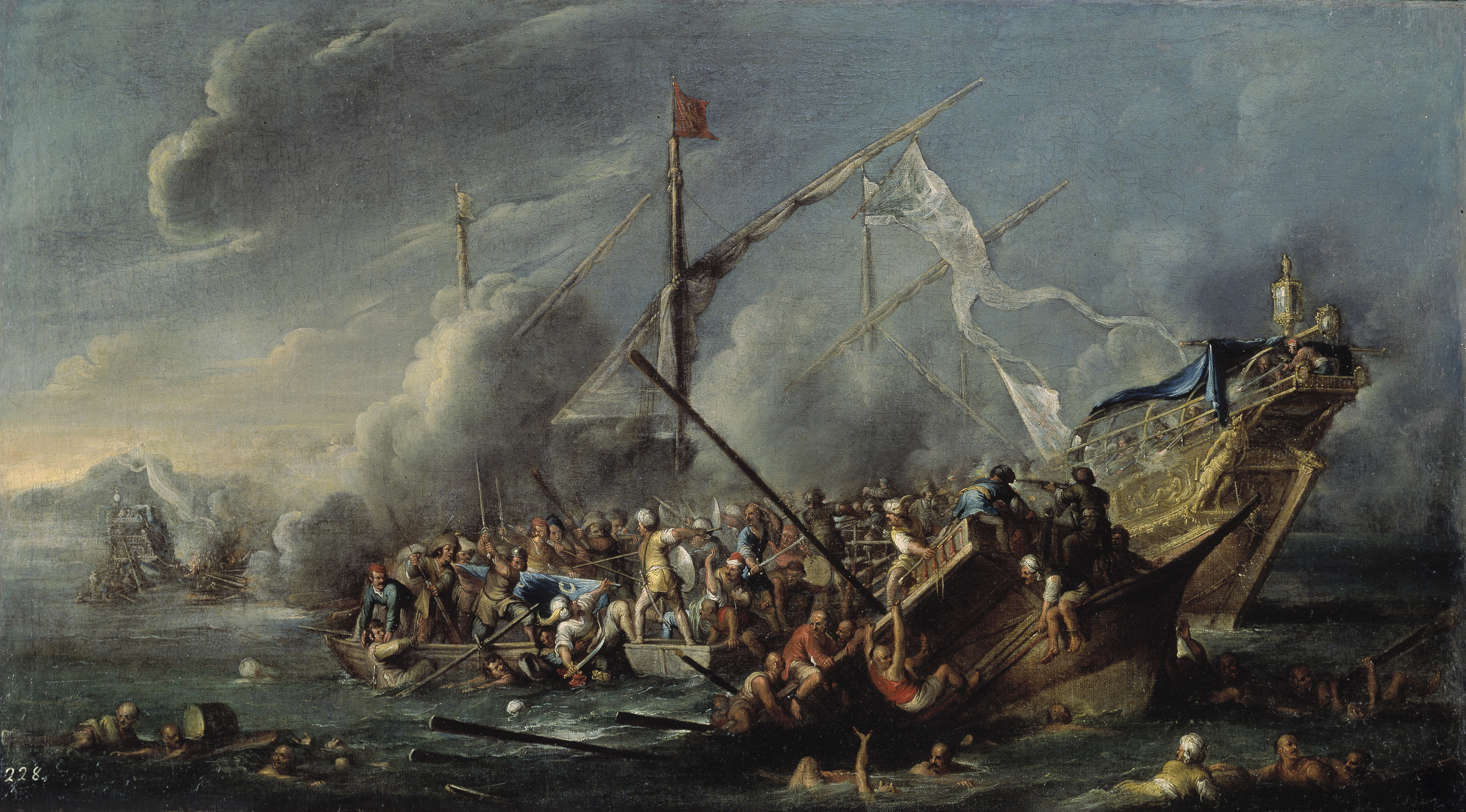
Naval battle between the Spanish and Turks

Cornelis de Wael (Antwerp, 1592 – Rome, 1667) was a Flemish painter, engraver and merchant who was primarily active in Genoa in Italy. He is known for his genre paintings, battle scenes, history paintings and still lifes. Through his art work, support for Flemish painters working in Italy and role as an art dealer, he played an important role in the artistic exchange between Italy and Flanders in the first half of the 17th century. His work also had an influence on local painters such as Alessandro Magnasco, particularly through his scenes of despair and irony.

== Life ==
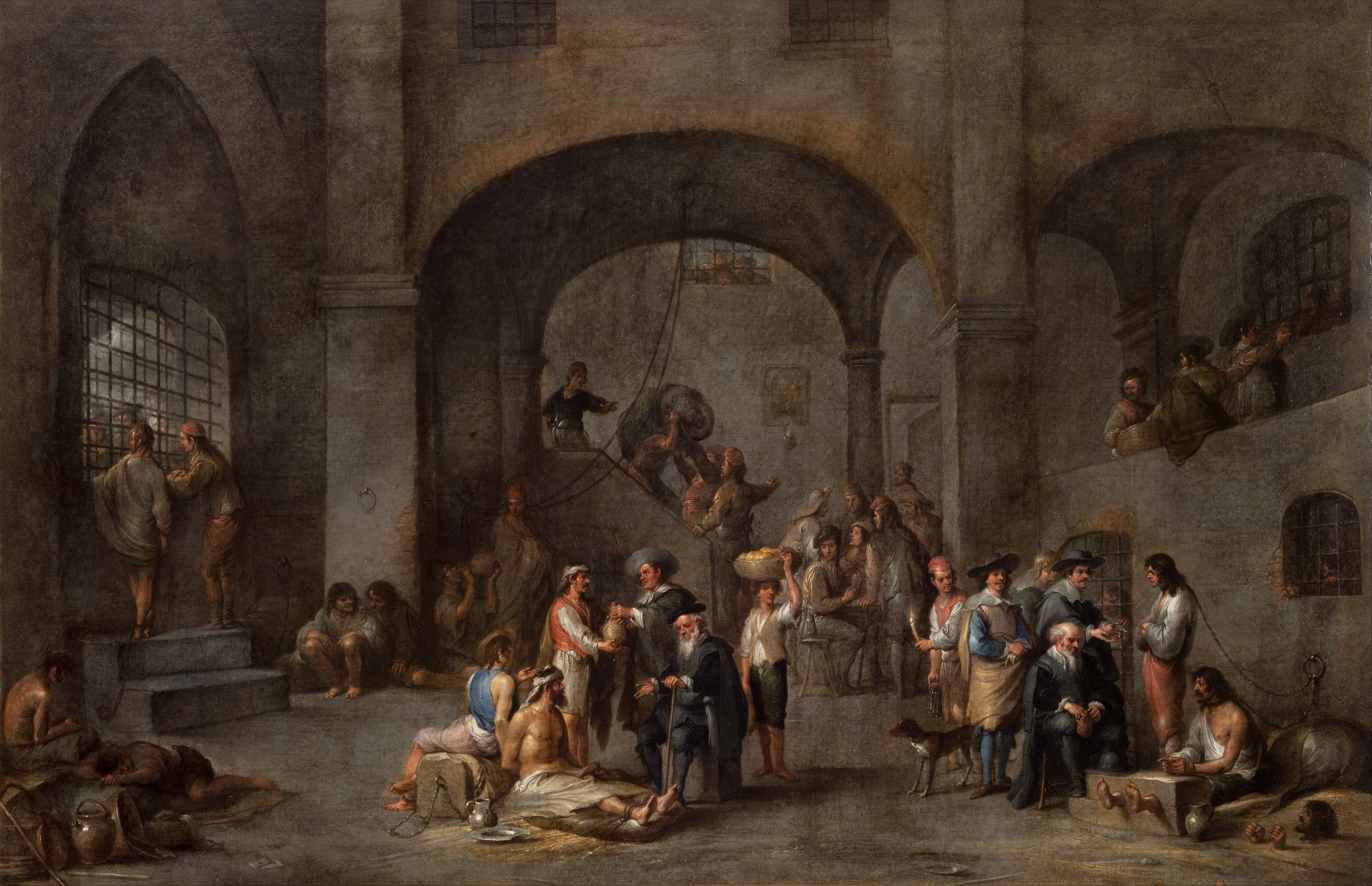
Visiting the prisoners

Cornelis de Wael was born into an artistic family in Antwerp as the son of the painter Jan de Wael I (1558–1633). His mother Gertrude de Jode came from a family of artists: her father was the cartographer Gerard de Jode and her brother was the engraver Pieter de Jode I.

In 1619 he emigrated to Italy with his brother Lucas de Wael (1591–1661), also a painter. They spent time first in Genoa and then in Rome where they came into contact with the members of the Bentvueghels, an association of mainly Dutch and Flemish artists working in Rome. In 1627 Cornelis became a member of the Accademia di San Luca, the prestigious association of artists in Rome which had very strict admission criteria. The brothers returned in 1628 to Genoa, where Cornelis resides for most of his life, whereas his brother Lucas returned to Antwerp in 1628. Genoa was at the time an attractive destination for artists since the competition between artists there was less intense than in the leading cultural centres Rome, Florence and Venice, while Genoa was a thriving port city where a large number of potential customers and collectors lived.

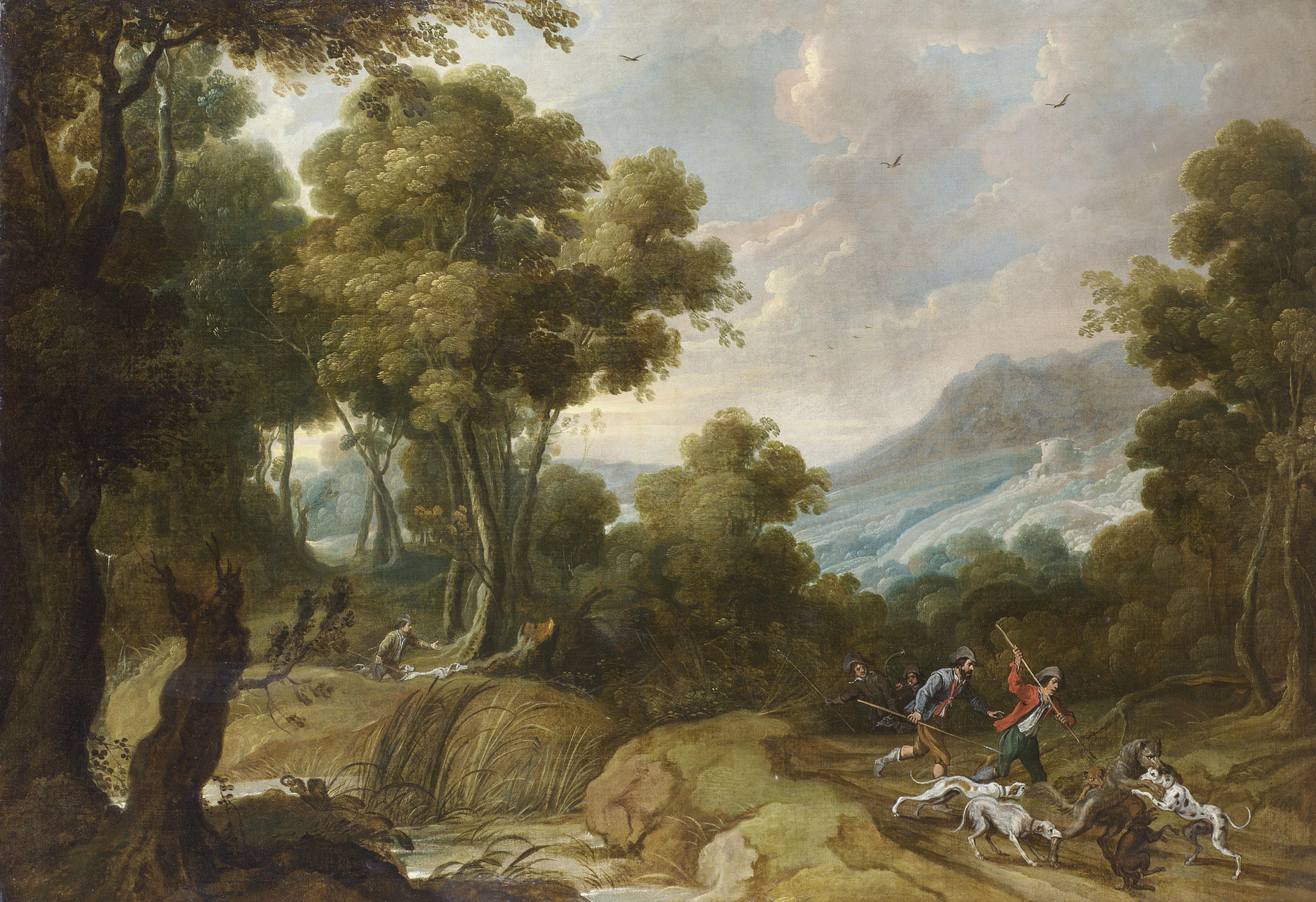
Forest landscape with hunters and their dogs attacking a wolf collaboration with Jan Wildens

The workshop of the brothers de Wael in Genoa became the centre of the colony of Flemish artists who resided in or passed through the city. These Flemish artists could take advantage of the work and artistic activity that their workshop attracted. The brothers provided a home, materials and tools, they assisted their compatriots with their local integration, passed on recommendations to clients and formulated competition rules. Some Flemish artists visiting Genoa became their collaborators. This is the case of the marine painter Andries van Eertvelt who is documented in Genoa from 1628 to 1630, where he lived with de Wael and became his collaborator. Van Eertvelt's pupil Gaspar van Eyck also who worked in Genoa from 1632 to 1640 and was de Wael's collaborator. When Anthony van Dyck visited Genoa, he stayed with the brothers. While it was formerly believed that Cornelis was one of van Dyck's closest collaborators in the city, recent scholarship has suggested that it is more likely that this role was played by the Flemish painter Jan Roos with whom signed collaborations have been preserved. Van Dyck painted a Portrait of the brothers de Wael (Pinacoteca Capitolina, Rome) that was later engraved by Wenceslas Hollar. The Flemish painter Jan Brueghel the Younger stayed with the brothers de Wael in Genoa from October until December 1622. Cornelis was also involved in trading activities with his hometown Antwerp dealing in a wide variety of goods. As an art dealer, he played an important role in introducing Rembrandt's prints in Genoa and Rome. His brother Lucas later returned to Antwerp and played a major role in these business activities.

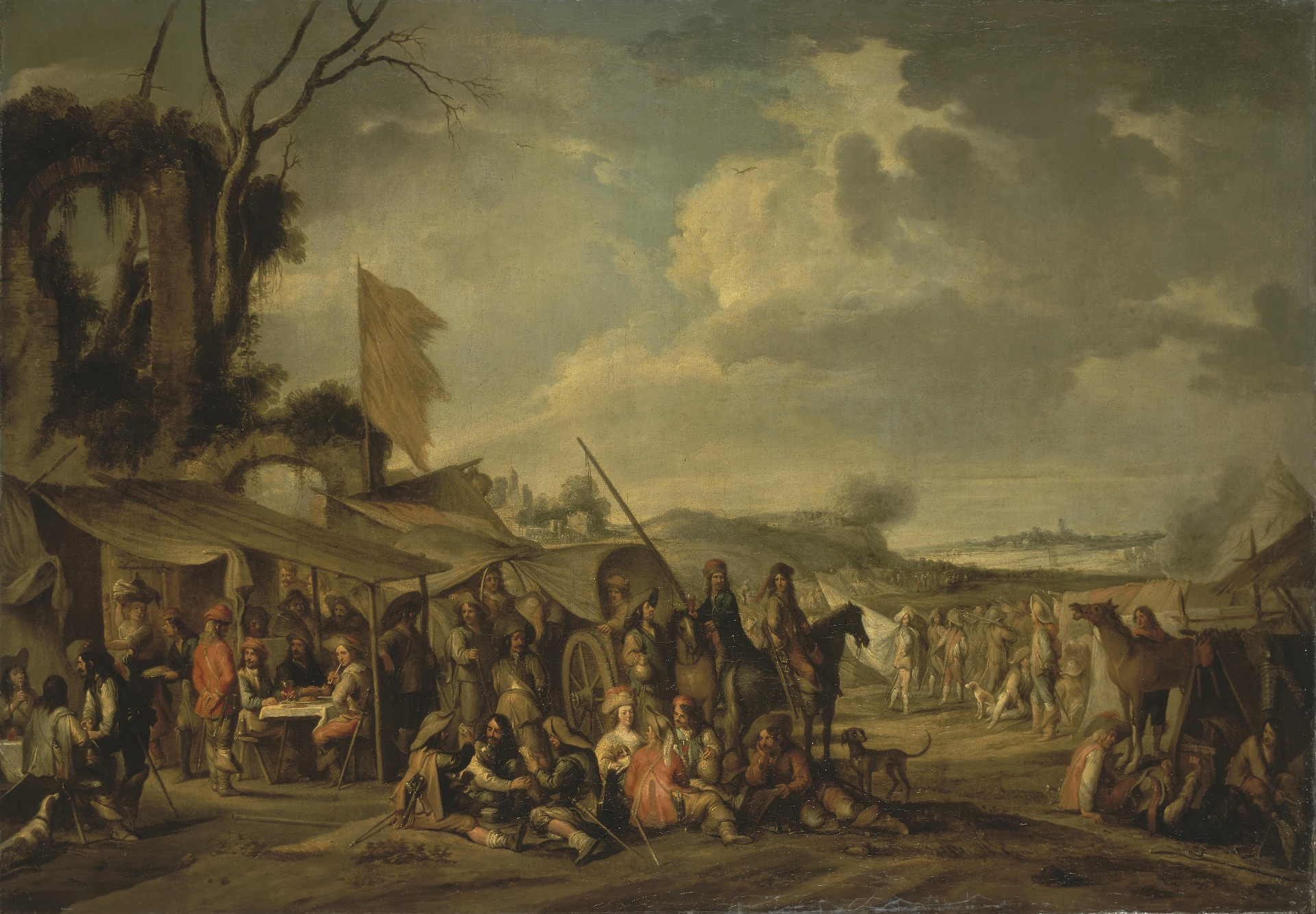
A camp by the ruins

Cornelis settled permanently in Rome around the year 1656 to avoid an outbreak of the plague in Genoa. Here he continued to paint and trade. From 1664 to 1666 he was prior of the congregation of San Giuliano dei Fiamminghi, which assisted Flemish residents of Rome.

There was a great demand for the work of Cornelis de Wael. His patrons included the rich patricians of the Government of the Republic of Genoa as well as Philip III of Spain and Philippe-Charles, 3rd Count of Arenberg.

De Wael's pupils included his nephew Jan Baptist de Wael (the son of Lucas), the Flemish painter Jan Hovaert (also known as Giovanni Hovart, Giovanni di Lamberto, Giovannino del su Lamberto, Jan Lambertsz Houwaert) and Antonio Rinaldi.

He died in Rome in 1667. Contemporary reports describe an impressive funeral attended by about 400 Flemish artists that formed part the Roman painters' colony.

== Work ==
De Wael was a versatile artist who produced etchings, paintings and drawings and may even have designed tapestries. De Wael worked in the most diverse genres. It is difficult to trace the evolution in his painting style since only one signed work of his has survived. On the other hand, a number of signed or inscribed drawings have been preserved. His work can be divided along two main lines: the works in the so-called "grand manner", which were not shown to the general public and the works in the "small manner". The latter were of medium, small and very small size and were populated by a large number of figures and show the influence of the Flemish painting tradition and the genre paintings of the 'Bamboccianti'. The Bamboccianti were a loose group of principally Dutch and Flemish genre painters residing in Rome who took the everyday life of the lower classes in Rome and its countryside as the preferred subject of their paintings. He also painted religious works, such as the series of paintings on the theme of the Seven works of mercy'.

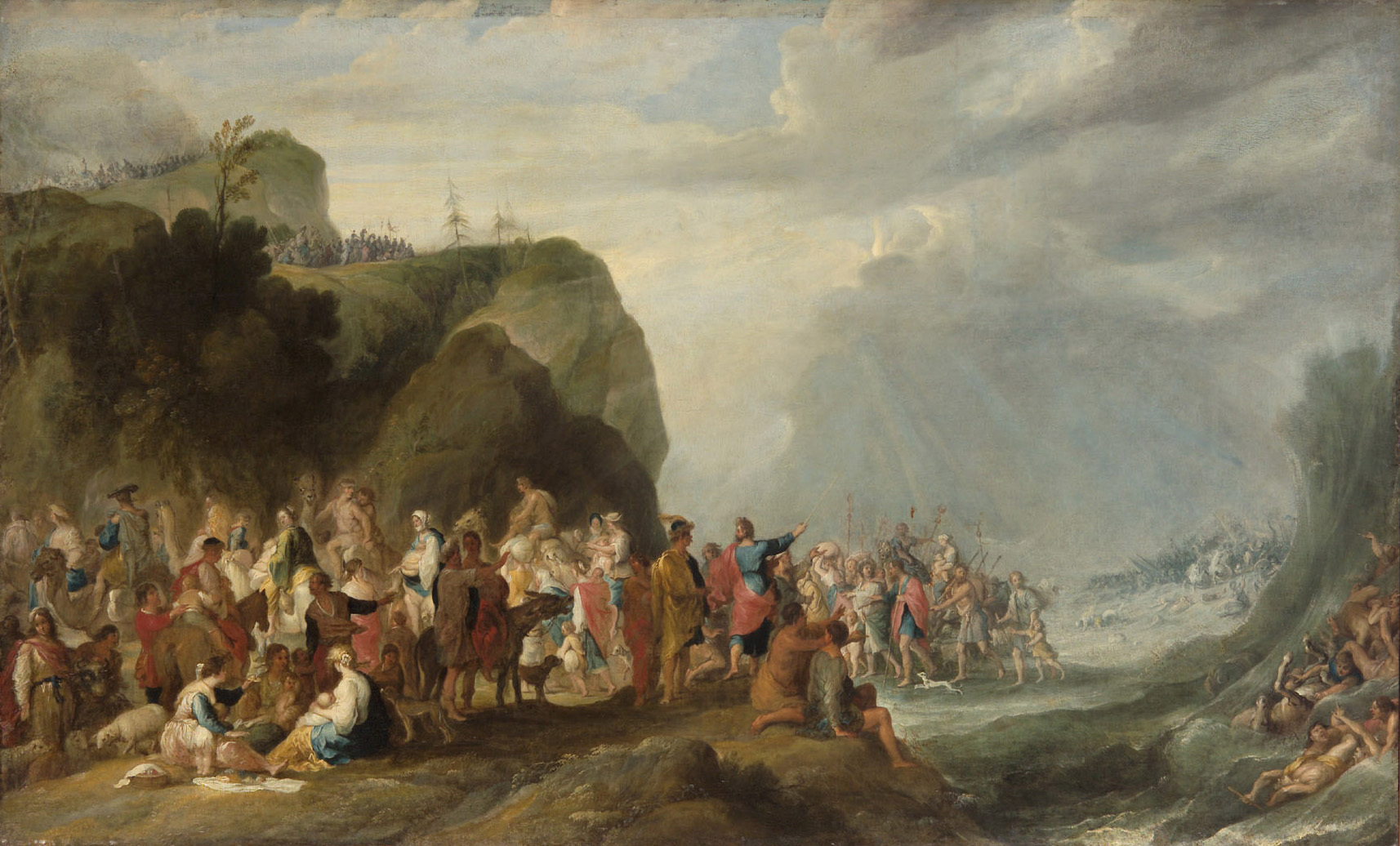
Crossing of the Red Sea

Cornelis de Wael was a specialist painter of battle scenes. A number of these paintings depicting battles on land (such as the Siege of Ostend, in the Museo del Prado) and sea (such as the Battle between Christians and Turks, in the Museo Poldi Pezzoli) have survived. The broad composition of some of his military works is close to that of the leading Flemish war artists Pieter Meulener and Adam Frans van der Meulen while their static quality recalls the work of Sebastiaen Vrancx.

Cornelis de Wael may also have been active as a portrait painter. Two lost portrait paintings of a 32-year-old man and a 20-year-old woman, which appeared in an 1873 sale in Paris, were reportedly signed and dated 1637. Two portraits of men on horseback were mentioned in a 17th-century inventory but their current location is not known. There is a portrait study of a woman by de Wael in the British Museum. The Portrait of Luca Giustiniani, Doge of the Republic of Genoa (Musée de Bastia) that was formerly attributed to him has been re-attributed to his pupil Jan Hovaert.

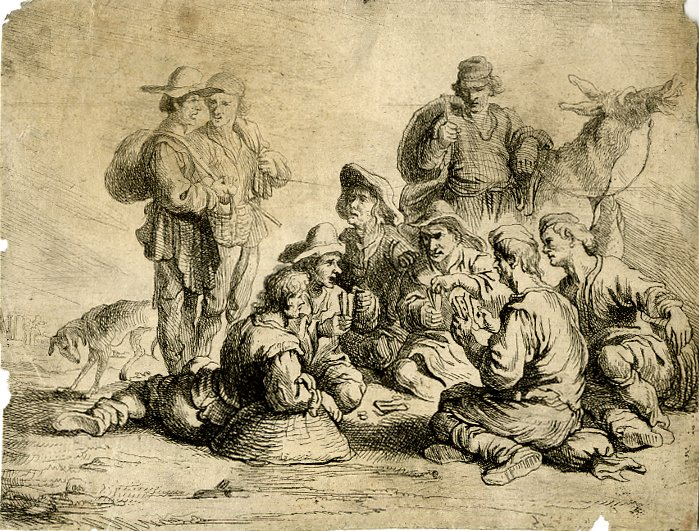
Men playing cards in a landscape

He collaborated with van Dyck as well as with other Flemish artists such as the landscape painter Jan Wildens. Collaborations with local artists were also frequent. De Wael or someone from his circle painted the staffage in the landscapes of the Italian landscape painter Giovanni Battista Vicino. In many of his battle scenes and harbour views his brother Lucas painted the landscapes while Cornelis in turn added the figures to Lucas' paintings.

He also left many drawings some of which are in the collections of the Louvre and the British Museum. The British Museum holds an album of 53 drawings dating from 1640 to 1650 which covers mainly military subjects. These drawings are generally direct and are often signed or inscribed. Many of his religiously themed drawings were turned into prints by his nephew Jan Baptist de Wael. The Antwerp engraver Melchior Hamers frequently engraved after the designs of de Wael. The Antwerp engraver and publisher Alexander Voet the Elder published engravings made after designs by de Wael such as the series of the Four Seasons and the Five Senses. De Wael also engraved his own prints. The British Museum holds a series of 19 prints depicting genre scenes published by Martinus van den Enden the Elder in Antwerp.
