= Johan de Waal =

Namibian politician (born 1949)

Chairperson of the Democratic Turnhalle Alliance
- In office 2000 – March 2010

Personal details
- Born: 17 September 1949 (age 76) Pretoria, South Africa
- Party: DTA
- Education: University of Pretoria
- Occupation: Politician
- Profession: Farmer

Johan Claasen de Waal (born 17 September 1949 in Pretoria, South Africa) is a Namibian politician. A member of the Democratic Turnhalle Alliance (DTA), de Waal was a member of the National Assembly of Namibia from 1994 to 2010. De Waal was placed third on DTA's electoral list ahead of the 2009 general election but lost his seat in the National Assembly after DTA received enough votes for 2 legislators. He resigned as chairperson of DTA in March 2010, citing a need to "move on" and make way for a younger generation. Since then he has focused on business operations.

== Career ==
De Waal was born in September 1949 in South Africa, but moved with his family to Namibia in the same year of his birth. He received a B.Comm. from the University of Pretoria in 1971. In 1976, he was a founding member of the Democratic Turnhalle Alliance and Secretary of Information. He was a leading member of the Republican Party of Namibia, a member of the alliance, until it broke with the DTA in 2003. In that year, de Waal, Barbara Rattay and Pieter Boltman formed the Alliance for Democratic Change, which maintained links with DTA. In March 2005, the DTA re-elected de Waal as party chairperson. While in the National Assembly, de Waal was the party's main spokesperson for trade and financial affairs.
