= André de Waal =

Dutch business consultant & author (born 1960)

André A. de Waal (born June 11, 1960 in Rotterdam) is a Dutch business theorist, consultant, Director at the Center for Organizational Performance, in Hilversum and senior lecturer at Wittenborg University of Applied Science (Wittenborg University of Applied Sciences), known for his contributions on performance management and high performance organizations.

== Education and career ==
He received a Master of Science degree in 1983 at the University of Leiden (The Netherlands) and an MBA in 1985 at Northeastern University in Boston. He received his doctorate in 2002 at the Vrije Universiteit Amsterdam, with a thesis on "The Role of Behavioral Factors in the successful Implementation and Use of Performance Management".

He worked for seventeen years as an organizational advisor and partner at Arthur Andersen and the Holland Consulting Group. As a consultant and researcher he primarily focuses on strategic performance management and organizations that excel.

In December 2007 he founded his own advisory and research company, Center for Organizational Performance, in Hilversum, The Netherlands.

In 2009 De Waal received the Highly Commended Award from the International Journal of Productivity and Performance Management for one of his articles, "Stimulating performance-driven behaviour to obtain better results" In 2012 De Waal received the Highly Commended Award at the Literati Network Awards for Excellence 2012 for his publication "The Evolutionary Adoption Framework: explaining the budgeting paradox" published in Journal of Accounting & Organizational Change.

He was selected by managementboek.nl as one of ten "Dutch Masters in Management."

The article entitled "Longitudinal research into factors of high performance: the follow-up case of Nabil Bank" published in Measuring Business Excellence has been chosen as an Outstanding Paper Award Winner at the Literati Network Awards for Excellence 2012.

== Publications ==
De Waal is the author of a number of books on the subject in English and Dutch, of which two have been translated into Chinese. A selection:

- Power of Performance Management: How Leading Companies Create Sustained Value. New York: Wiley, 2001. ISBN 978-0-471-43800-7. Held in 833 libraries according to WorldCat
- Strategic Performance Management: A Managerial and Behavioural Approach. Basingstoke [England]: Palgrave Macmillan, 2007. ISBN 978-1-4039-9884-2
- Quest for Balance: The Human Element in Performance Management Systems. New York: Wiley, 2002. ISBN 978-0-471-20571-5
- What Makes A High Performance Organization: Five Factors of Competitive Advantage that Apply Worldwide. London [England]: Global Professional Publishing, 2012. ISBN 1906403783. ISBN 978-1-9064-0378-2.
