= Sinibaldo Scorza =

Italian painter (1589–1631)

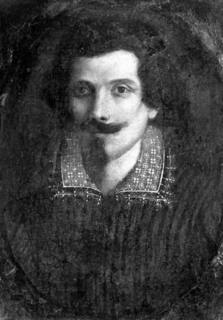
Self-Portrait, in the Vasari Corridor of the Uffizi Gallery.

Sinibaldo Scorza (16 July 1589 – 5 April 1631) was an Italian painter, draughtsman and etcher.

He was born into a wealthy aristocratic family from Voltaggio (now part of Piedmont), his father being the Conte Scorza di Voltaggio, and he received a literary and humanist education. He first trained with a poorly known painter, Giovanni Battista Carosio, and his son Bernardo until he moved in 1604 to Genoa and apprenticed with Giovanni Battista Paggi. He painted a "Christ comforted by Angels" in the painting gallery of the Cappuccini.

In 1619 the Duke Carlo Emanuele I of Savoy named Scorza his court painter, and he was granted a monthly pension of 50 ducats per month. However, when war erupted between Genoa and Savoy in 1625, he returned to Genoa, and there he was charged with treason. He was exiled to Massa, then to Rome, where he worked for several years before he was granted permission to return to Genoese territory and Voltaggio in 1627. During his last years, Scorza influenced Giovanni Benedetto Castiglione. He is one of the painters mentioned in Raffaello Soprani’s biographies.

Scorza is best known for paintings in which animals are part of the narrative, such as the story of Noah and others. Part of this attention to nature was derived from his exposure to the person and works of diverse northern European artists who worked in Genoa: Frans Snyders and his pupil Jan Roos and Pieter Boel and Goffredo Wals.
