= Jan de Wael I =

Flemish painter (1558–1633)

Jan de Wael
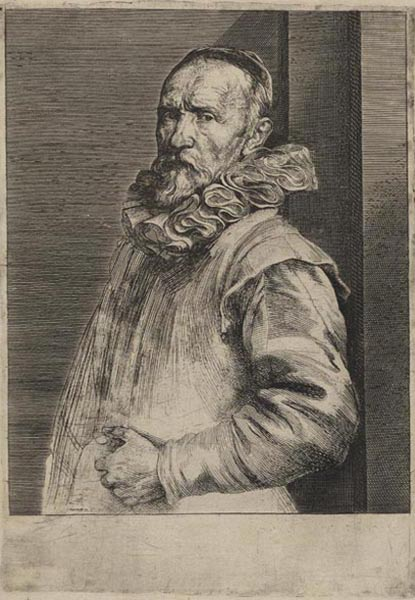
- Portrait of Jan de Wael after painting by Anthony van Dyck.
- Born: Jan de Wael; 1558; Antwerp
- Died: 1633 (aged 74–75); Antwerp
- Known for: Painting, engraving
- Movement: Baroque

Jan de Wael or Hans de Wael or Jan Baptist de Wael (1558–1633) was a Flemish painter and engraver who mainly painted religious works and landscapes.

== Biography ==
Jan de Wael was born in an artist family in Antwerp and was a pupil of Frans Francken I. He became a master in the Guild of St. Luke in 1584 and then travelled to Paris with the painter Jan de Mayer. He did quite well, and when he came back, he married Gertrude (or Gertruyt, Geertruijdt) de Jode in 1588. She came from a family of engravers: the famous map engraver Gerard de Jode was her father, Pieter de Jode I was her brother and Pieter de Jode II was her nephew. He became dean of the guild in 1595.

The principal importance of Jan de Wael lies in his role as a teacher. He trained his sons Cornelis de Wael and Lucas de Wael as painters and engravers. They resided for a long period in Italy where they settled in Genoa.

One of Jan de Wael's most important pupils was Jan Roos who would later also establish himself permanently in Genoa, where he had a major influence on the art of the local painters of the Genoese school. Other pupils were Jacques Firens and Carel Simons.
