= Jacques Fouquier =

Flemish painter

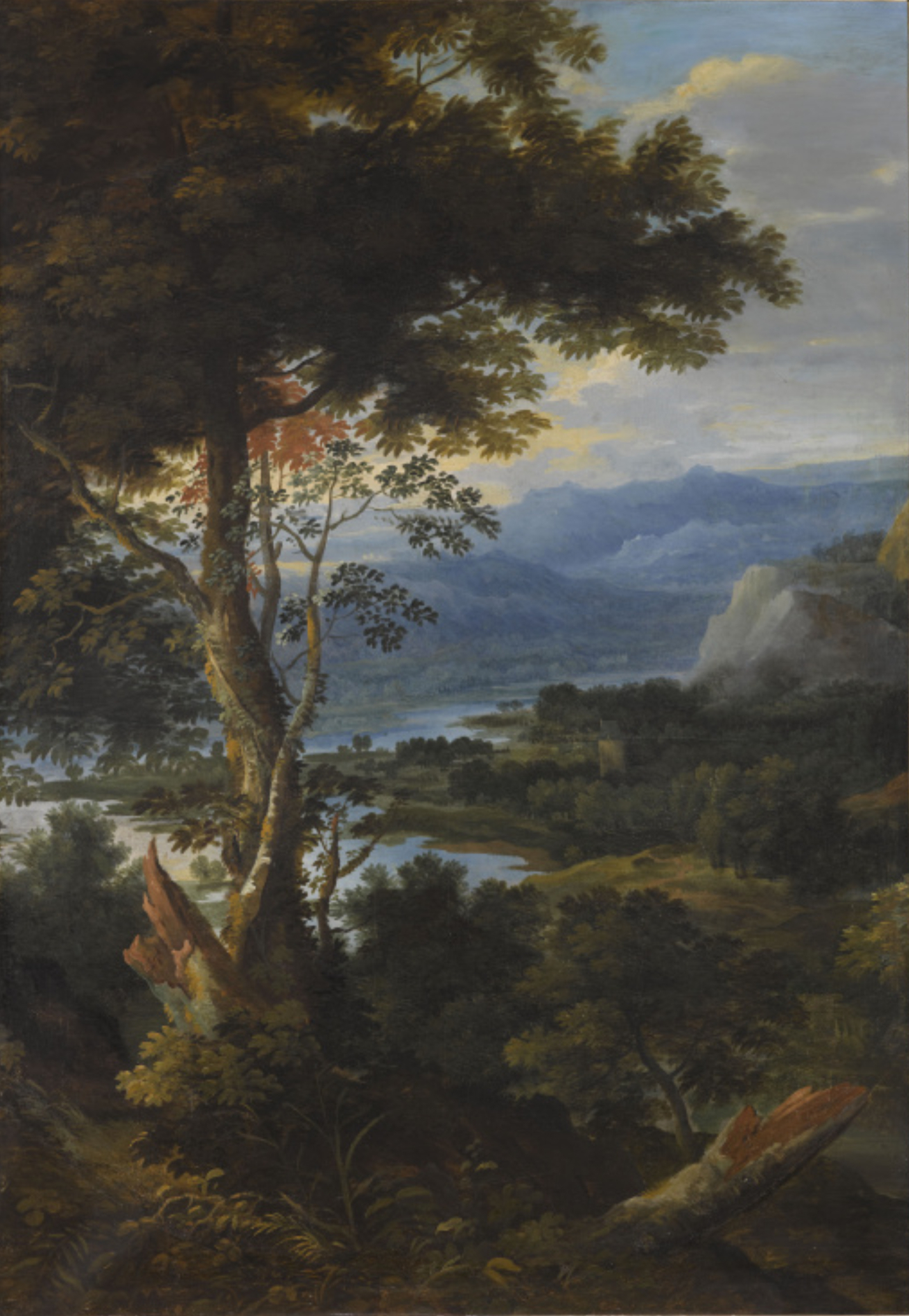
Landscape with a river in the mountains

Jacques Fouquier or Jacques Fouquières, birth name Jacob (December 1590 – 1655) was a Flemish landscape painter. After training in Antwerp he worked in various places where he often obtained appointments as a painter to the court including that of the French kings. He earned great success and a very high reputation during his lifetime and was even referred to as the 'Flemish Titian'. Very few of his paintings have been preserved. His work was influential in his time and was widely circulated thanks to the reproductions made by various contemporary engravers.

== Life ==
There has in the past been some uncertainty about various aspects of Jacques Fouquier's life such as his birth date and place and the masters he studied with. He was traditionally believed to have been born in Antwerp at about 1580. Wolfgang Stechow was able to show in 1930 that his birth date should be placed around 1590. He came to this conclusion on the basis of an autograph inscription by Fouquier on a drawing dated 1604 kept in the Art Collection of the University of Göttingen (inv. no. H 465). The drawing contains in the lower right corner the inscription I.F. jaques foucquier me feciet aetatis suae 13 iaer 1604 5 ianvarer ('I.F Jacques Foucquier made me at the age of 13 in the year 1604 on 5 January. Research of the parish records kept by churches in Antwerp have shown that the artist was baptized with the first name 'Jacob' at the Antwerp Cathedral on 23 December 1590 as the son of Anthoni Foucuqiuer (Foucuqiur) and Lysbet. His godparents were Jacob van Bergen and Catelyn van Harlen. His baptism in Antwerp makes it likely that his place of birth was Antwerp. His father may be identical to the Antony Foucque (Focke or Focque) who was living in the Borsestraat in central Antwerp in 1585 and was a pedlar by trade.

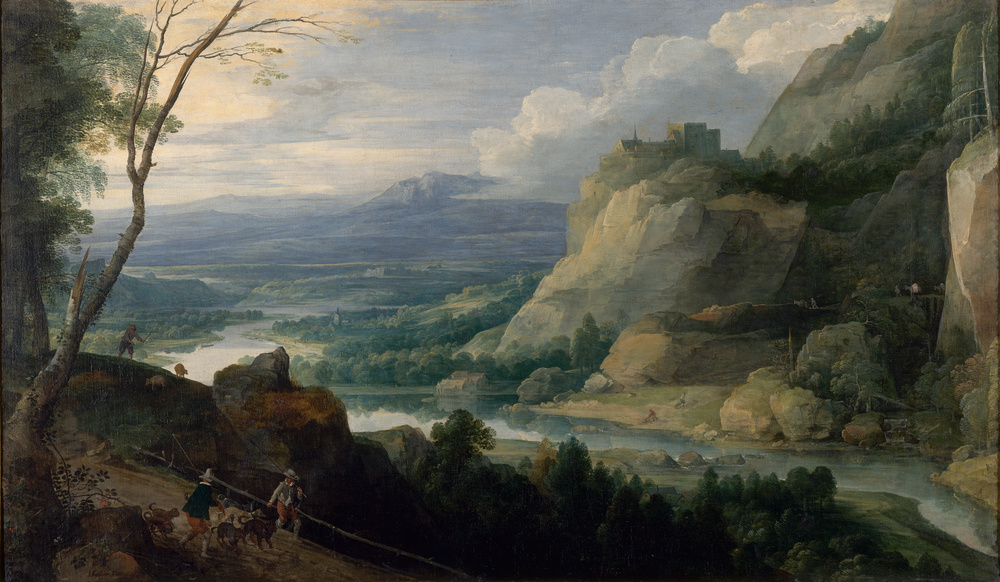
Landscape with hunters

In 1614 he was registered as a master painter in the registers of the Antwerp Guild of St. Luke under the name Jacques Foucque. The record does not mention who was his master. Some art historians have proposed a traineeship first under Joos de Momper, a prominent landscape painter and later under Jan Brueghel the Elder, a prolific painter and regular collaborator of Rubens. While there is no documentary evidence for such apprenticeships, they are supported on stylistic grounds. Although some biographers believe he left Antwerp shortly after 1614, others claim he is still mentioned in Antwerp as late as 1616. He was possibly registered in the Brussels' Guild of Saint Luke in 1616 as a pupil of Arnould van Laken and became citizen of the city of Brussels in the same year.

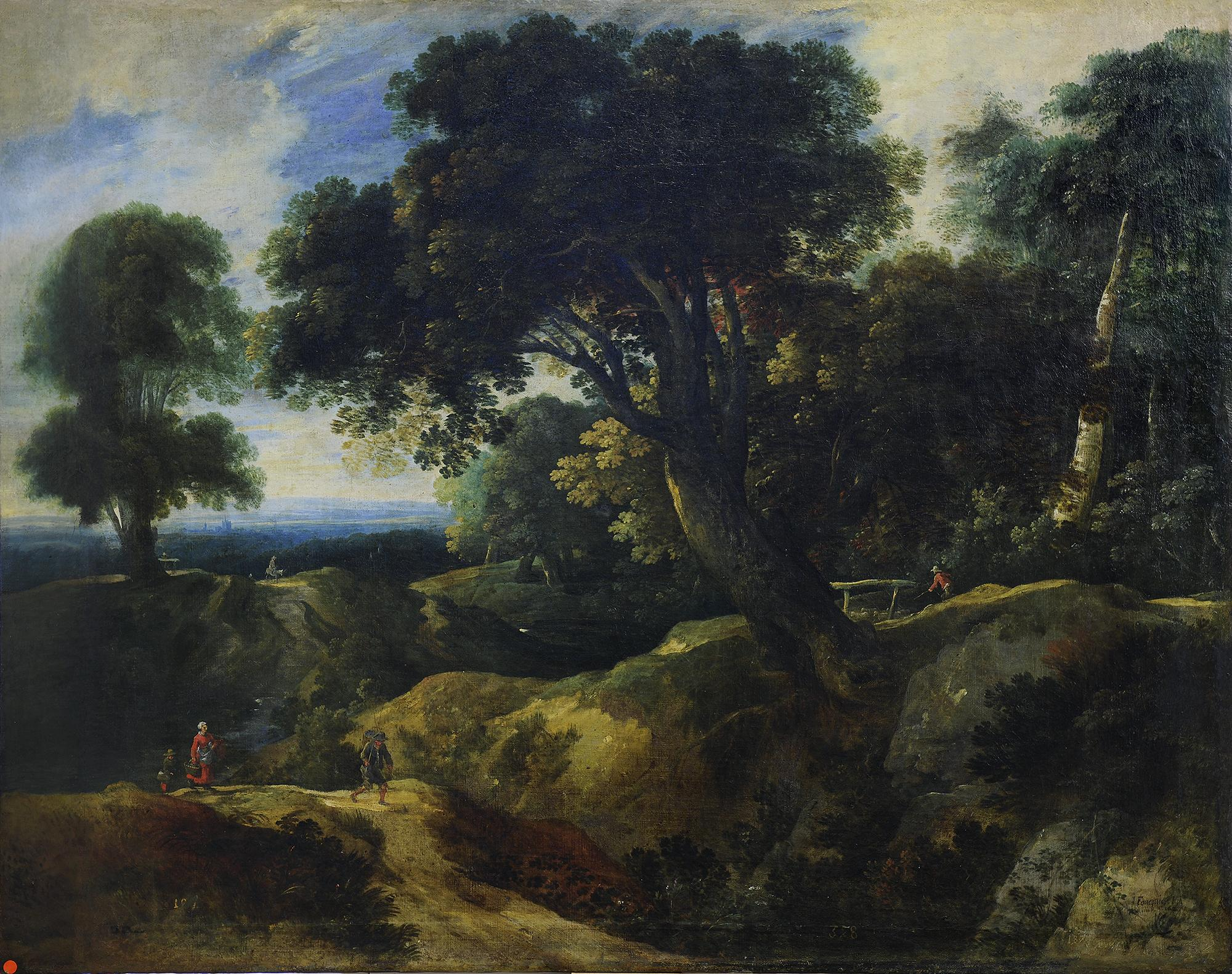
Landscape with a tree hanging above a path

In the period between 1616 and 1619 he worked in Heidelberg at the court of the art loving Frederick V, the Elector Palatine. He was in charge of the decorative programme for the new 'Englischer Bau' (English building) of Heidelberg Castle, which was purpose-built for the Elector's English bride Elizabeth Stuart. He also painted a View of the Hortus Palatinus and Heidelberg Castle during this time (before 1620, (Kurpfälzisches Museum, Heidelberg). From 1619 to 1621 he was back in Brussels, where Philippe de Champaigne was one of his pupils. He possibly travelled around 1620 to Italy where he resided for a time in Rome.

At the latest by 1621 he had established himself in Paris, where he became court painter to King Louis XIII. The monarch elevated him to the peerage in 1626. This mark of distinction is said by Dezallier d'Argenville to have rendered him so vain, that afterwards he always painted with his sword on his side. On 15 July 1626 the king commissioned him to make plans, paintings and views of landscapes for the Grande Galerie of the Louvre palace. To execute this commission, Fouquier travelled to Toulon in 1626, Aix-en-Provence in 1627, Toulon and Marseille in 1629 and Toulon and Aix-en-Provence in 1632 and Toulon in 1633. It seems he was a slow (or even lazy) painter as only in 1632 the citizens of Toulon were able to send the first of his two large paintings to the King. Legend has it that this commission was the cause of a public rift between Foucquier and Nicolas Poussin in the summer of 1641. It was provoked by the exacting attitude of Foucquier vis-à-vis Poussin in relation to the decoration of the Grande Galerie of the Louvre palace. Foucquier insisted his landscapes be the principal decorations. In a letter to Paul Fréart de Chantelou, Poussin made fun of "le baron Foucquier" and is said to have avenged himself after his escape from Paris associated with the dispute in an allegory in which Foucquier was represented by a donkey on which Jacques Lemercier sat enthroned as the queen of stupidity.

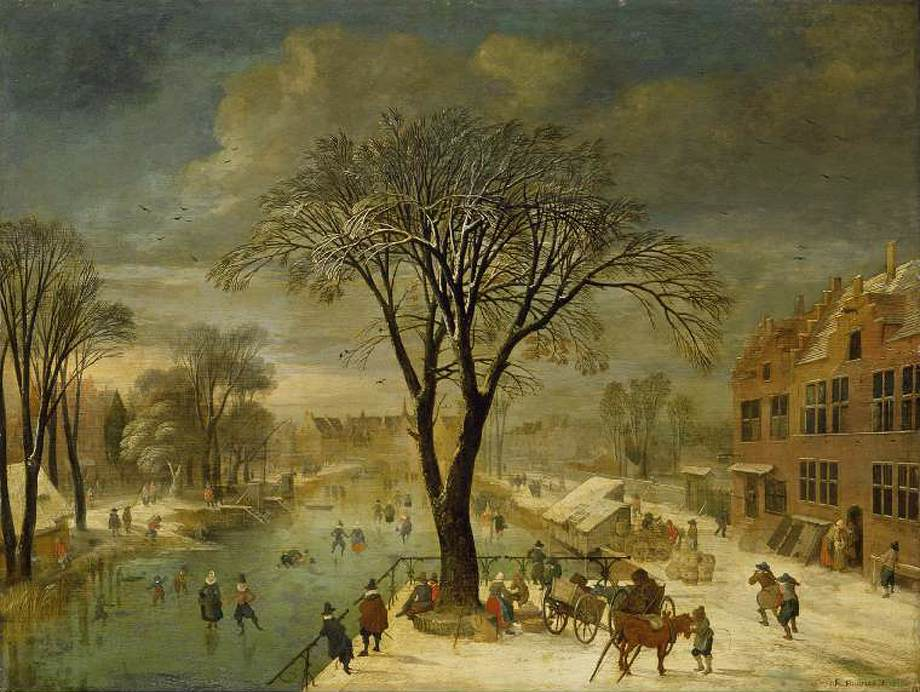
Winter landscape, 1617, Fitzwilliam Museum

Fouquier lived in 1644 together with Flemish artists Philippe Vleughels, Pieter van Mol, Willem Kalf, Nicasius Bernaerts and Peter van Boucle in Paris. He died at the end of 1655 in a room given to him by the painter Sylvain in the Fauxbourg Saint Jacques in Paris. The inventory of his estate was drawn up on 4 January 1656 at the behest of his creditors. His meager possessions are evidence that he had fallen on hard times at the end of his life.

His pupils included Philippe de Champaigne, Matthieu van Plattenberg, and Etienne Rendu.

== Work ==
Fouquier was a specialist painter and draughtsman of landscapes. While his paintings are now scarce, drawings from his entire career are preserved in various collections. The city views he made for the King of France are lost as well as a series of grand landscapes he made for the Tuileries. Unlike many of his contemporaries, he usually took charge himself of the painting of the staffage in his landscapes. This did not prevent a collaboration with Rubens on a Landscape with a satyr chasing a nymph formerly in the collection of Archduke Leopold Wilhelm of Austria in which Rubens painted the satyr and nymph and Fouquier the landscape.

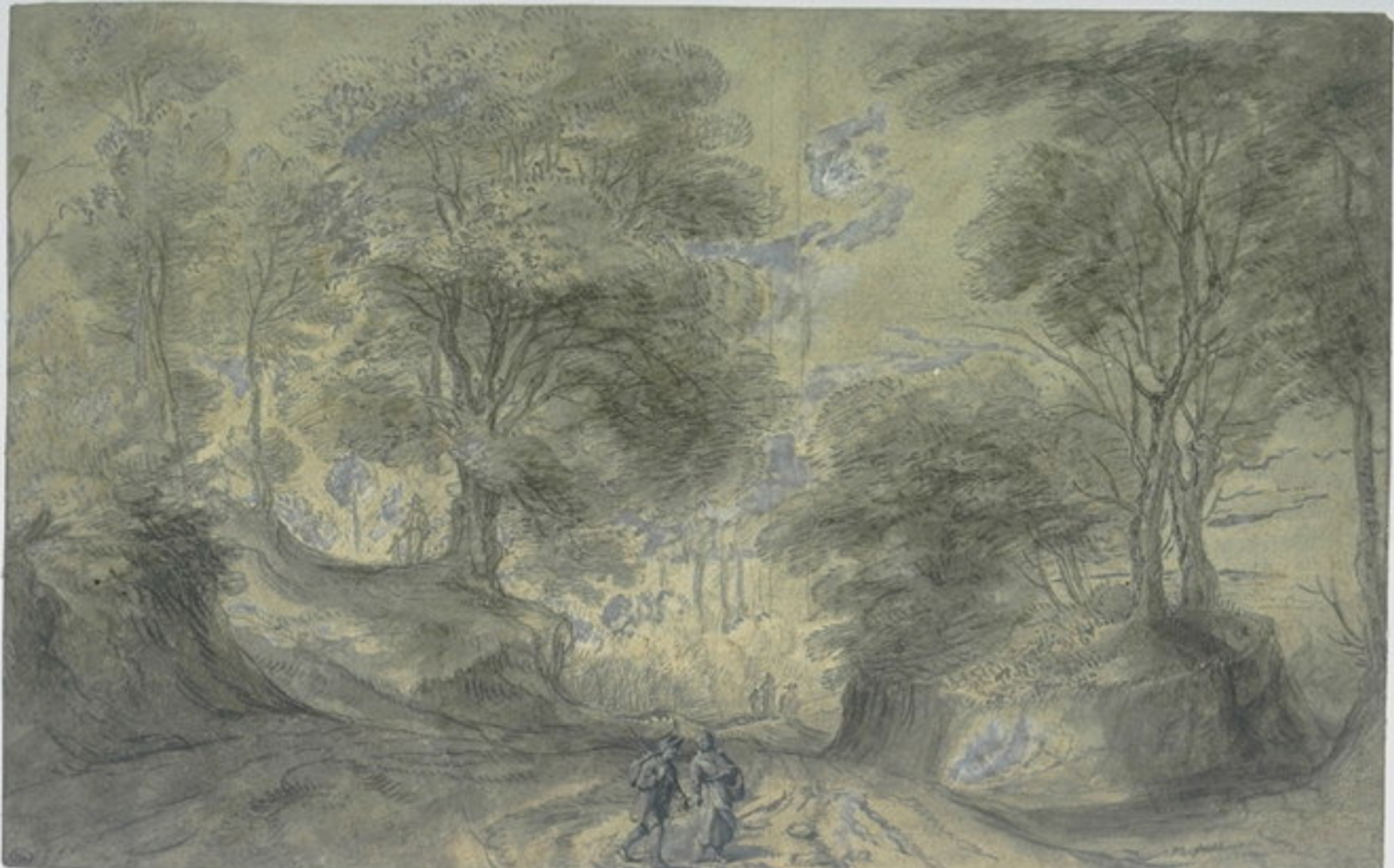
Landscape with two figures on a road descending through trees

His early work showed the characteristics of the Northern style prevalent in the late 16th and early 17th centuries as represented by the works of Joos de Momper and Jan Brueghel the Elder, which was still dependent on the world landscape tradition started in the early 16th century. This tradition showed a preference for sweeping views with craggy rocks in the distance and a blue-greenish palette. The influence of this tradition is visible in his earliest known painting, the Winter landscape of 1617, now in the Fitzwilliam Museum. This work also shows the influence of Dutch painters such as Adriaen van de Venne and Hendrick Avercamp. The Landscape with hunters (signed and dated 31 July 1620, Musée d'Arts de Nantes) is from this same period and show de Momper's influence. The agitated figures in the landscape are painted by Fouquier himself and are typical of his work.

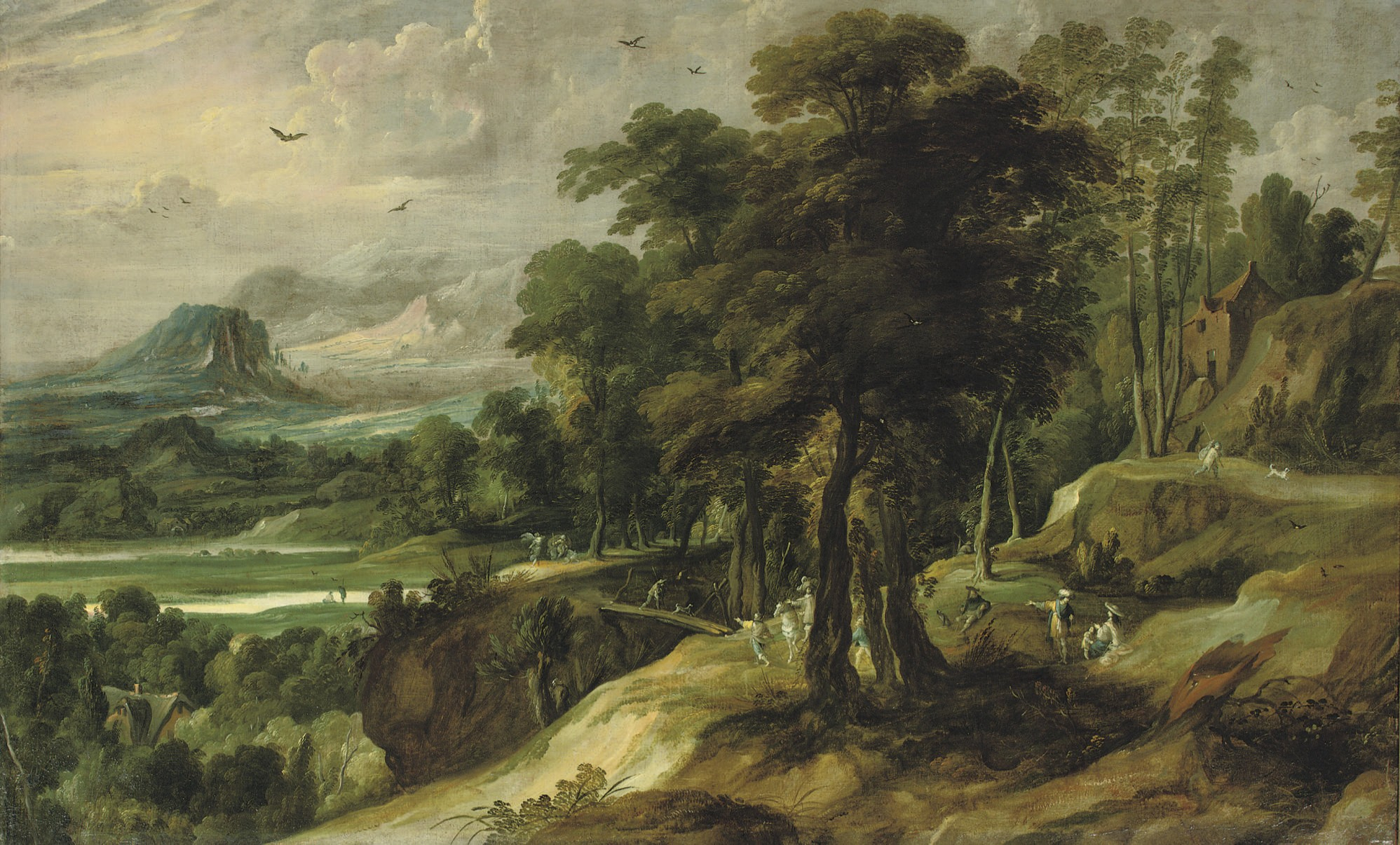
Extensive river landscape with the Angel appearing to Balaam's ass

In his 1622 Forest landscape (Wallraf–Richartz Museum) he broke with this tradition by abandoning the wide panoramic landscapes in favour of a narrow focus on the depiction of a dark tree and a group of trees. In this development he followed in the footsteps of Gillis van Coninxloo a generation before him. He does not follow van Coninxloo in the direction of-a more naturalistic display of leaves, but he maintains the abbreviated, schematic treatment of foliage to concentrate rather on the new compositional ideas: uniform space in the foreground and middle ground rather than the stratification of the foreground, middle ground and distant portions and the romantic rocks of the de Momper school, only occasional perspective into the distance, greater ability to draw the viewer into the image, and above all a harmonization of color with more emphasis on light and the direction of the light: The color scheme, especially in the background, points to later developments in the 17th century such as seen in the works of Gaspard Dughet and Jacques d'Arthois. The question has been raised as to whether the change in style is attributable to Fouquier's collaborations with Rubens. No clearly documented works from after the style change are known. There are, however, many authenticated drawings which indicate that at that time Fouquier was much influenced by the classicising trend of the Carracci's and Paul Bril, which was then being introduced into France through the works of Poussin, Claude Lorrain and Gaspard Dughet.

Many of the works of Fouquier were engraved by contemporary artists including Alexander Voet the Younger, Matthieu van Plattenberg, Jan Baptist de Wael, Jean Morin, Gabriel Perelle, Jean-Jacques de Boissieu, Nicolas Cochin and Ignatius van der Stock. The prints provide a record of Fouquier's large-scale works that were produced after his move to France, most of the originals of which have been destroyed or not located. They show that throughout his French period Fouquier remained faithful to the style he adopted from 1622 onwards.
