= Jean Baptiste de Champaigne =

Flemish painter

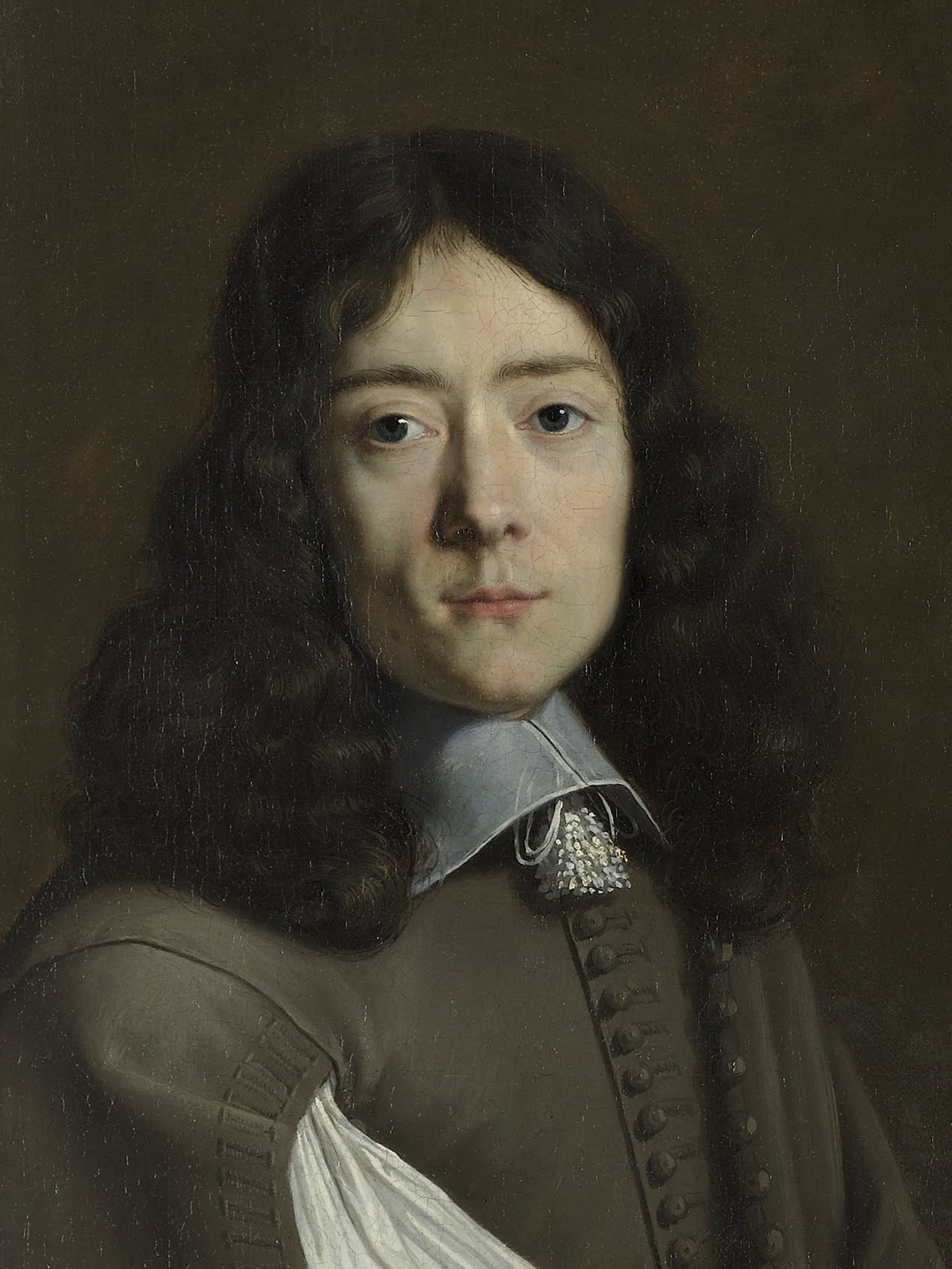
- Detail from Double Portrait of both Artists
- Born: December 10, 1631; Brussels, Habsburg Netherlands
- Died: October 27, 1681 (aged 49); Paris, Kingdom of France
- Notable work: Portrait of a man, perhaps Philippe de la Trémoïlle (1596-?), count of Olonne
- Style: Baroque

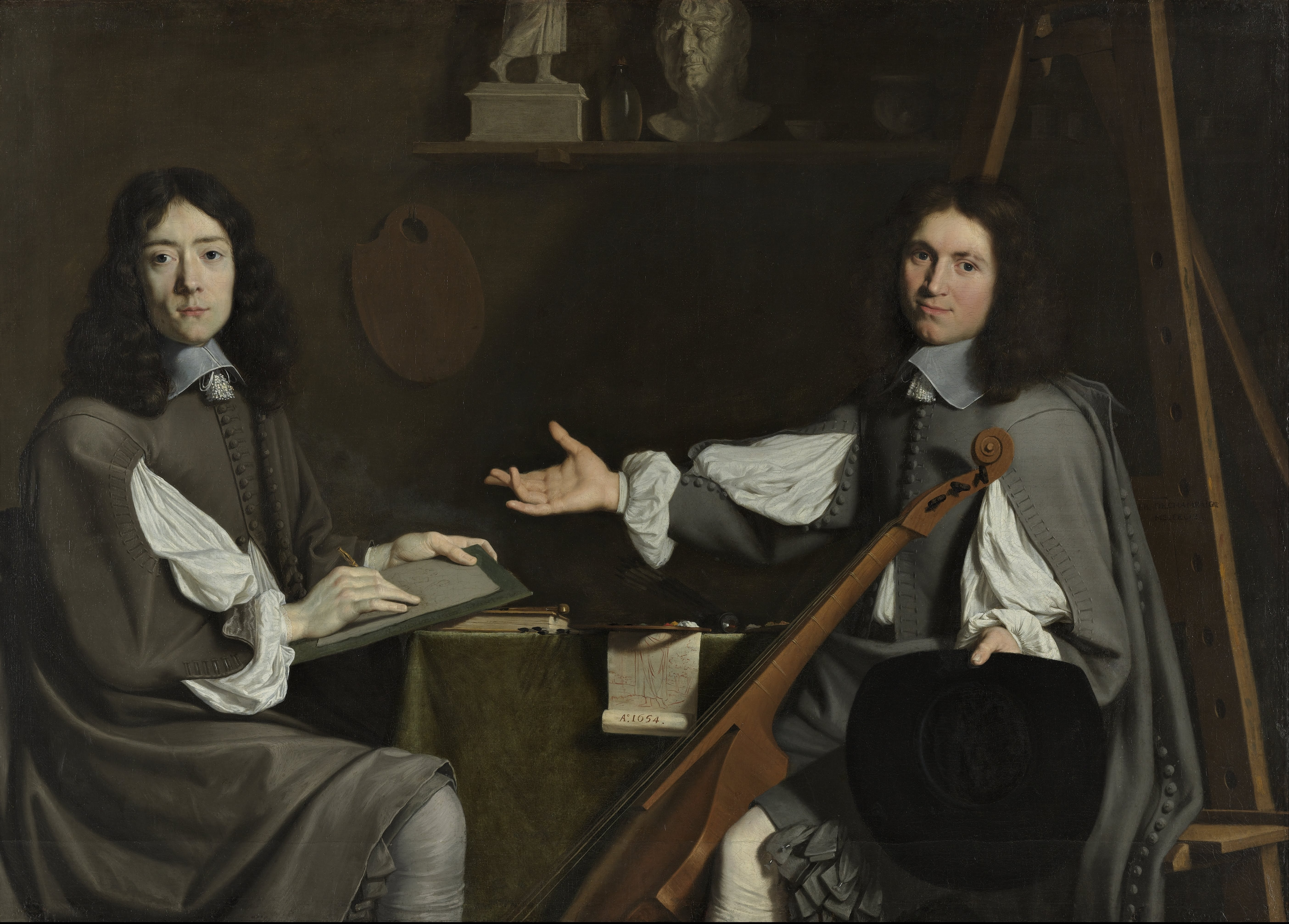
de Champaigne and Nicolas de Plattemontagne

Jean Baptiste de Champaigne (10 December 1631 – 27 October 1681), was a Flemish-born French Baroque painter and teacher.

== Biography ==
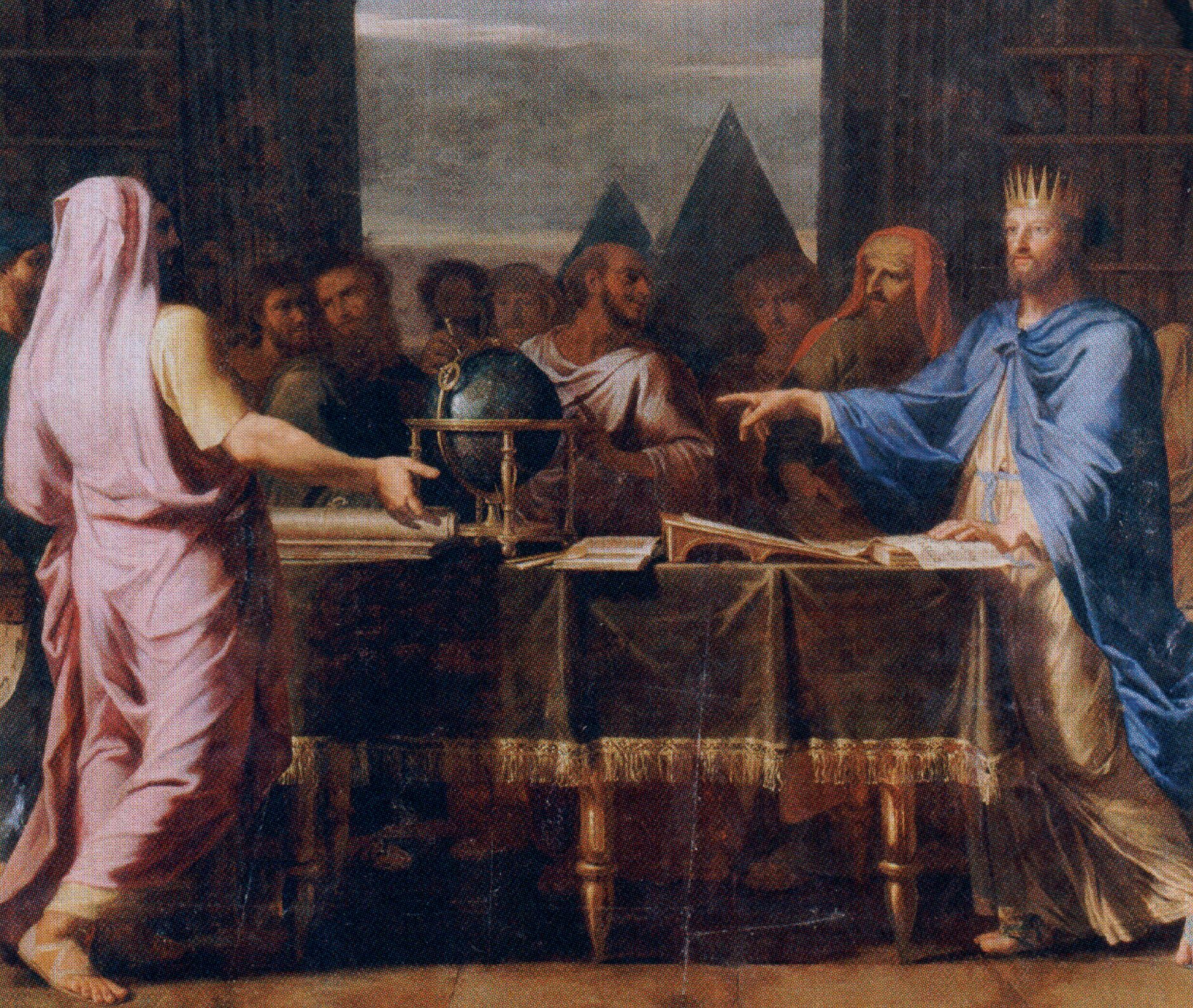
King Ptolemy II

He was born in Brussels. He was the nephew of Philippe de Champaigne and moved to Paris to become his pupil in 1643. In 1658 he undertook a trip to Italy to copy the works of Raphael and Titian. When he returned he became a member of the Brussels Guild of Saint Luke, and in 1671 he accepted a post as teacher in the prestigious Académie de peinture et de sculpture in Paris.

According to Houbraken he was very fortunate to have survived longer than Philippe's own children so that he was brought up like a true son. He died in Paris.
