= Nicolas de Plattemontagne =

French painter and engraver (1631–1706)

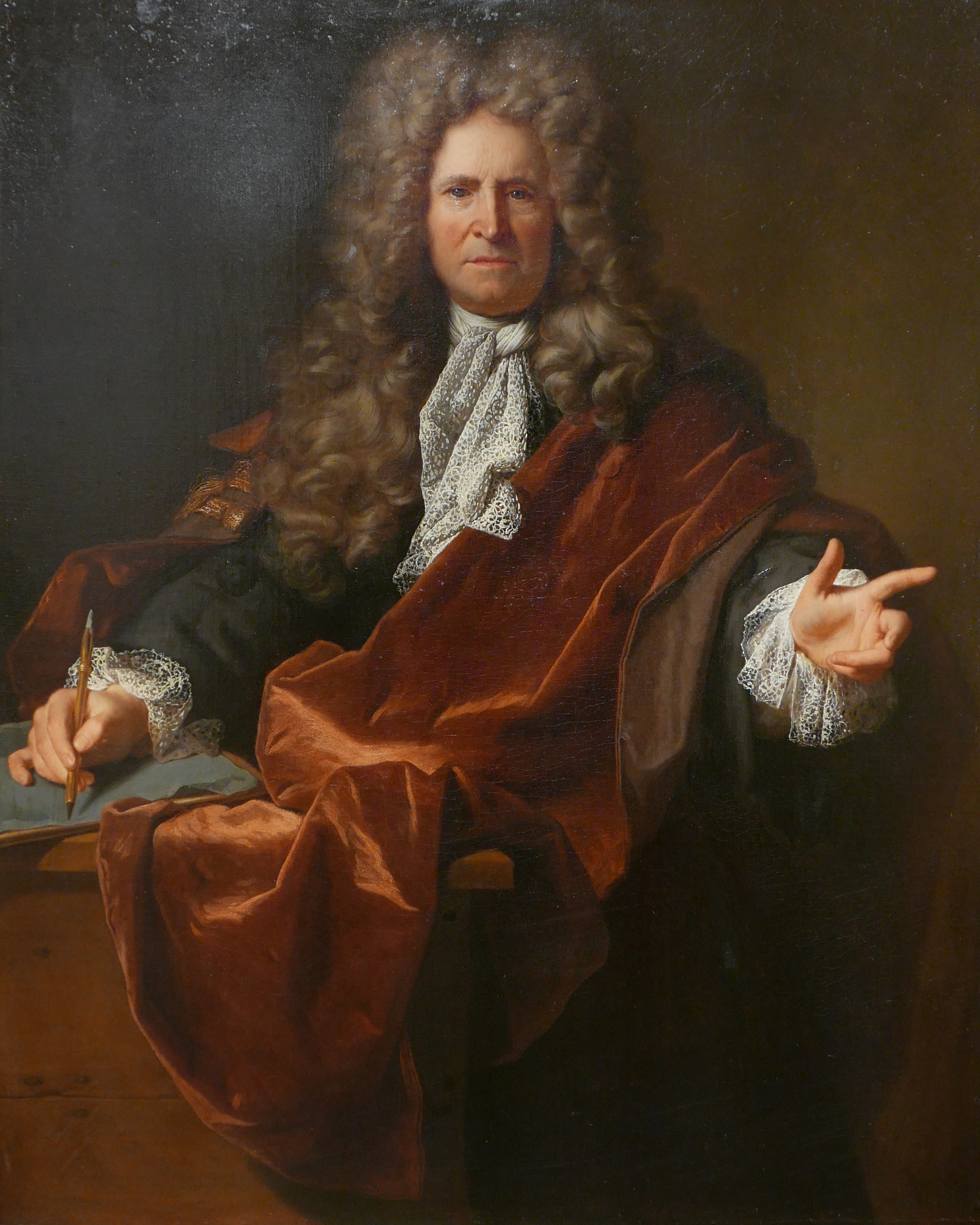
Nicolas de Plattemontagne; portrait by Jean Ranc

Nicolas de Plattemontagne, originally Nicolas Van Plattenberg (19 November 1631, Paris - 25 December 1706) was a French painter and engraver. His name also appears as La Montagne, Montagne and Montaigne.

== Biography ==
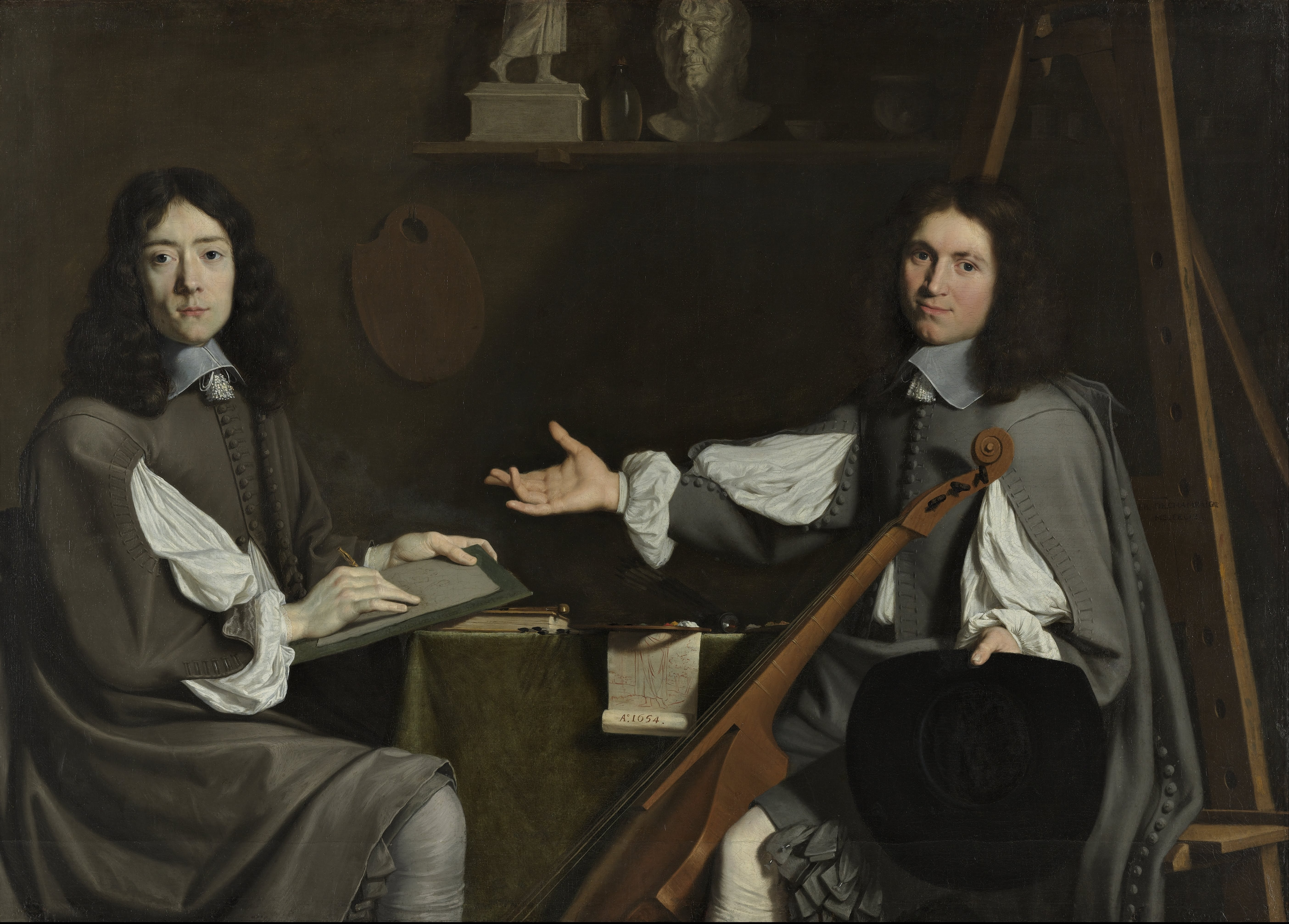
Dual portrait with Jean Baptiste de Champaigne, his life long friend

His father was the Flemish painter and engraver Matthieu van Plattenberg, originally from Antwerp, who specialized in maritime scenes. In addition, his uncle was the engraver, Jean Morin, who gave him his first lessons in that subject.

In his youth, after learning the basics from his father, he studied with Philippe de Champaigne, one of the greatest painters and engravers in the Classical style. He also became a collaborator in the workshop belonging to Champaigne's nephew, Jean-Baptiste, who also became his lifelong friend. For many years, some of Plattemontagne's early works were confused with those by both of the Champaignes, and it is only rather recently that the confusion has been resolved.

From 1655 to 1656, under the direction of the elder, Champaigne, he participated in decorating the apartments of Anne of Austria at the abbey of Val-de-Grâce.

In 1663, he was accepted as a history painter at the Académie royale de peinture et de sculpture, and was later named a Professor. Previously, he had focused on portraits. Three years later, he was chosen to create the annual painting for the "Mays", commissioned by the Goldsmiths' Guild of Paris for Notre Dame Cathedral. He produced a "Saint Paul and Silas", which is now at the Louvre. In 1669, he was hired to decorate the apartments of Louis, the Dauphin at the Palais des Tuileries.

In 1703, Jean Ranc painted his portrait at the Château de Versailles. That painting served as Ranc's reception piece for acceptance at the Académie.

He was largely forgotten within a few years of his death. After some research around the turn of the 20th century, resulting in several reattributions, his corpus appears to comprise seventeen paintings and about eighty engravings or drawings.

== Selected works ==
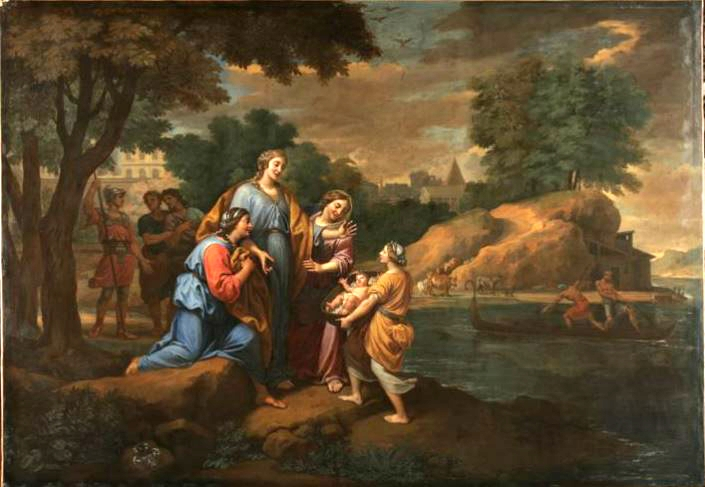
Moses Rescued from the Waters

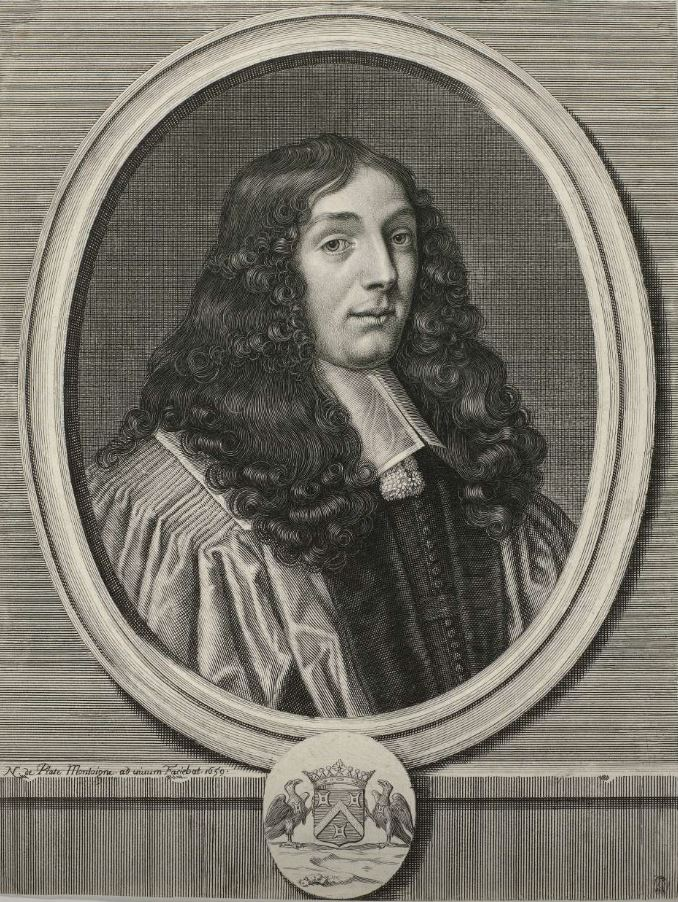
Portrait of
Henri Louis Habert de Montmor

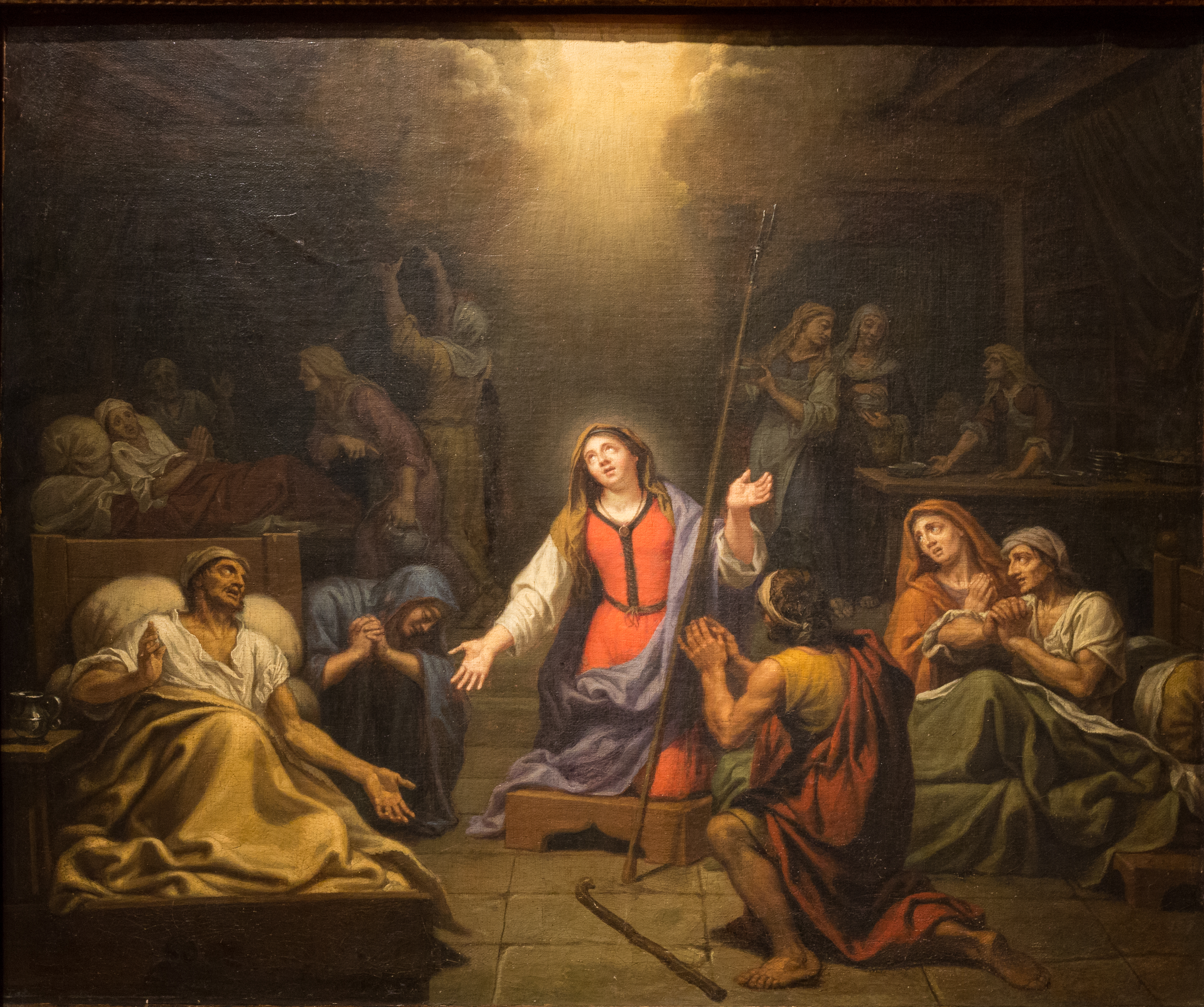
Saint Genevieve Giving her Protection to the Sick

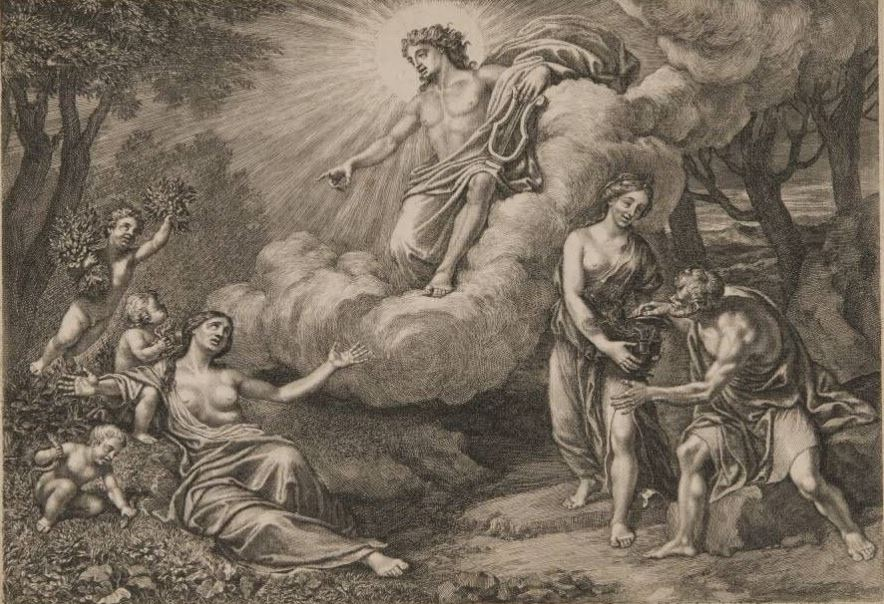
Apollo with his Lyre, in the Clouds

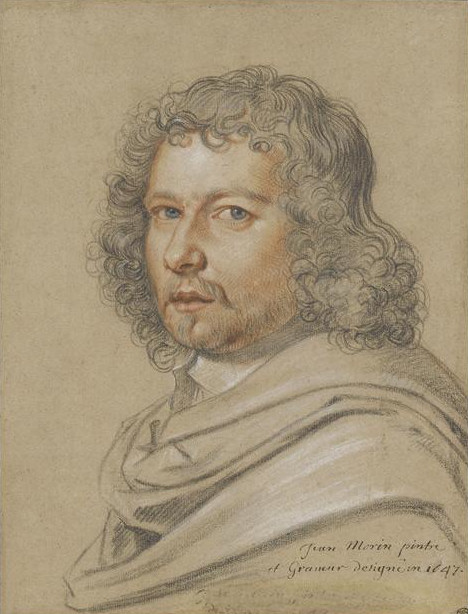
Portrait of
Jean Morin
