= Matthieu van Plattenberg =

Flemish painter

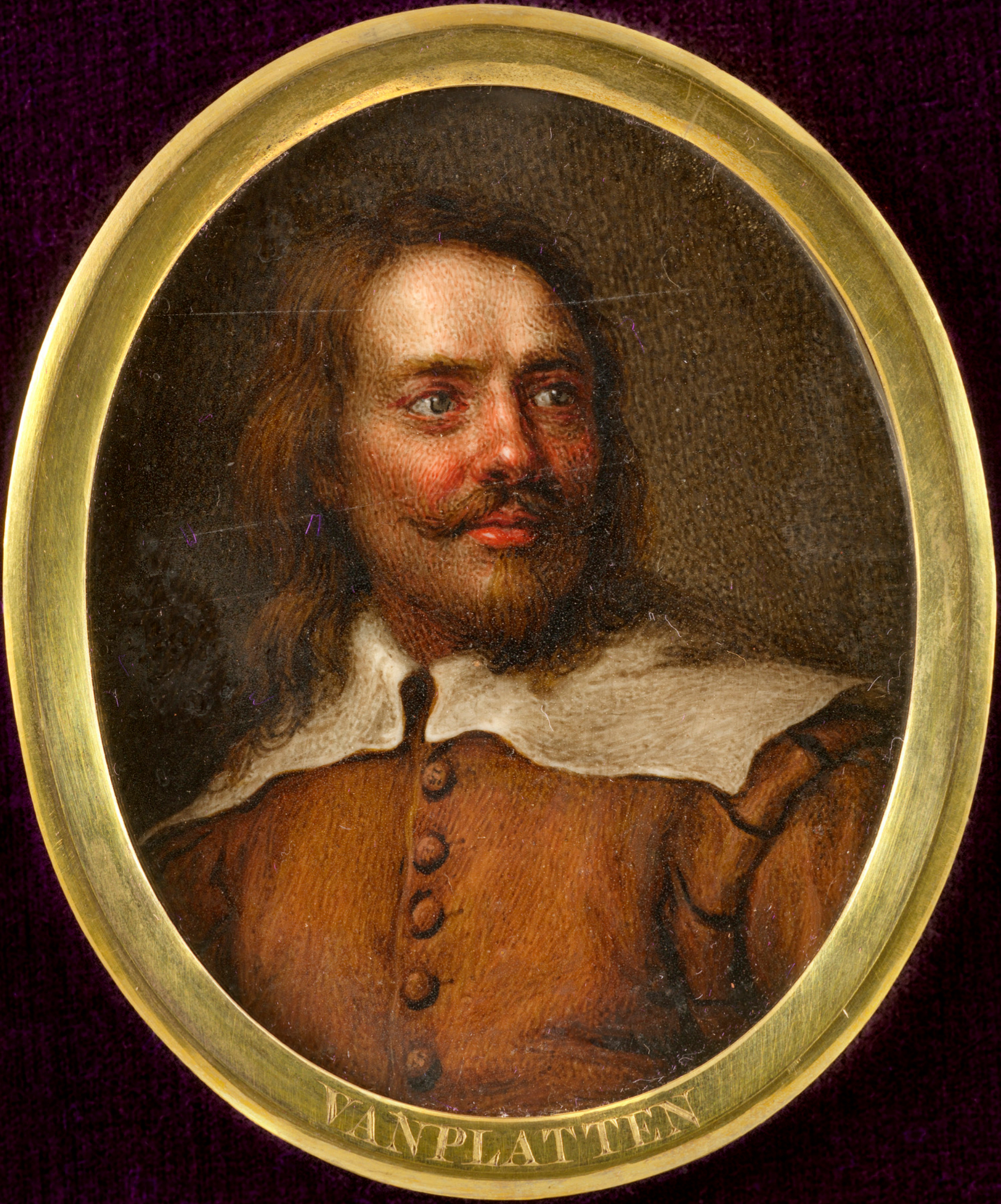
Portrait of Matthieu van Plattenberg by Giuseppe Macpherson

Matthieu or Matthijs van Plattenberg, known in France as Matthieu de Plattemontagne, Matthieu de Platte Montagne and Matthieu Montaigne (1607 or 1608 – 19 September 1660) was a Flemish Baroque painter, draughtsman, etcher and engraver who specialized in marine paintings and landscapes. He spent most of his career abroad, first in Italy and then in France where he played an important role in the development of the painting of stormy seascapes.

== Life ==
Matthieu van Plattenberg was born in Antwerp in 1607 or 1608. He was likely a pupil of the marine painter Andries van Eertvelt in Antwerp. He travelled together with van Eertvelt to Italy, where he worked in Florence.

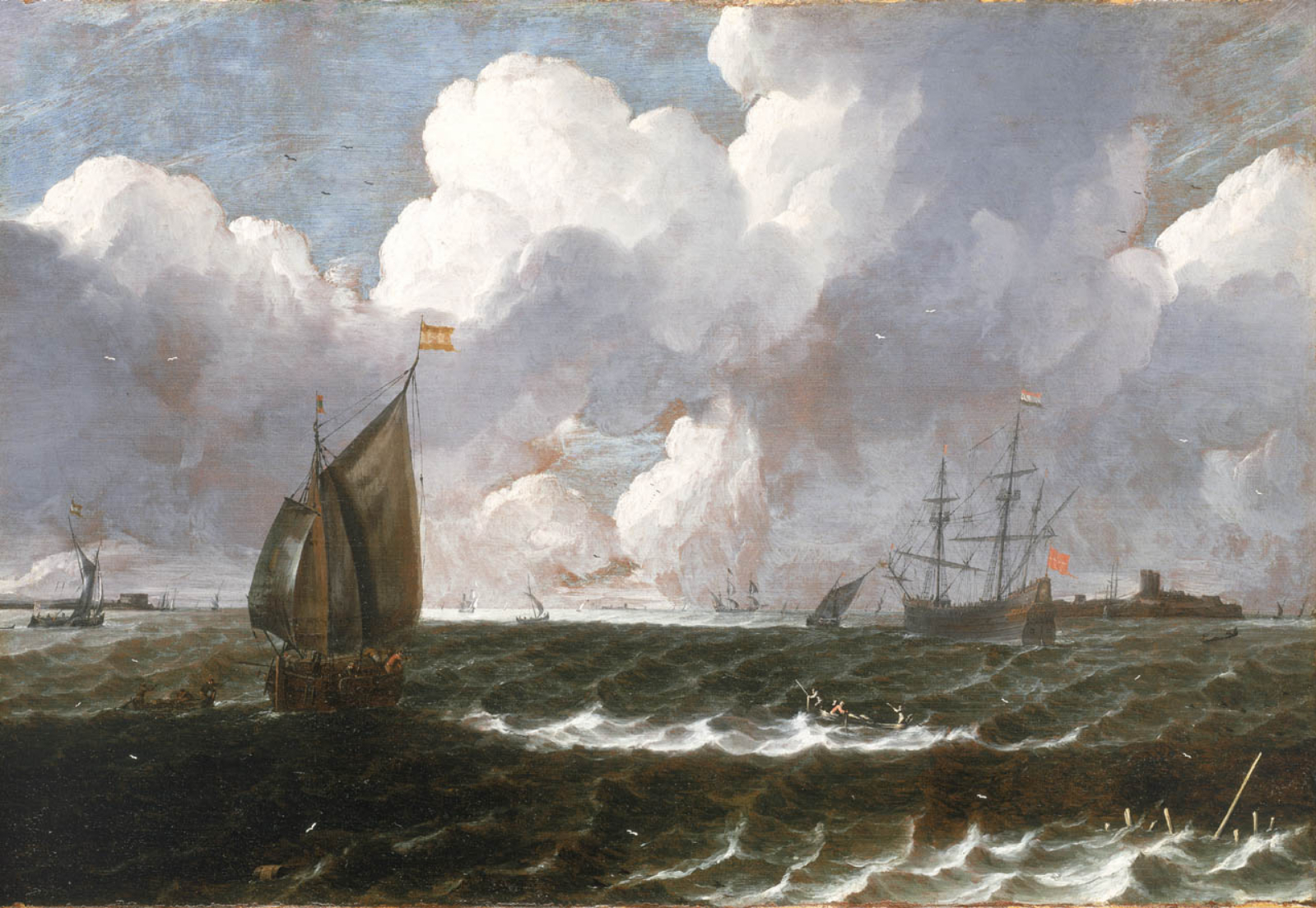
Shipping in a River Estuary

From around 1630 he worked in Paris. He was active as a painter and copper engraver as well as a designer of embroidery patterns. In Paris, he studied under the Flemish émigré painter Jacques Fouquier who was a well-established landscape painter and printmaker. Fouquier taught him how to etch. In 1631 he married in Paris the sister of the French painter, engraver and publisher Jean Morin. Van Plattenberg and Morin collaborated on publishing projects for which van Plattenberg made the engravings.

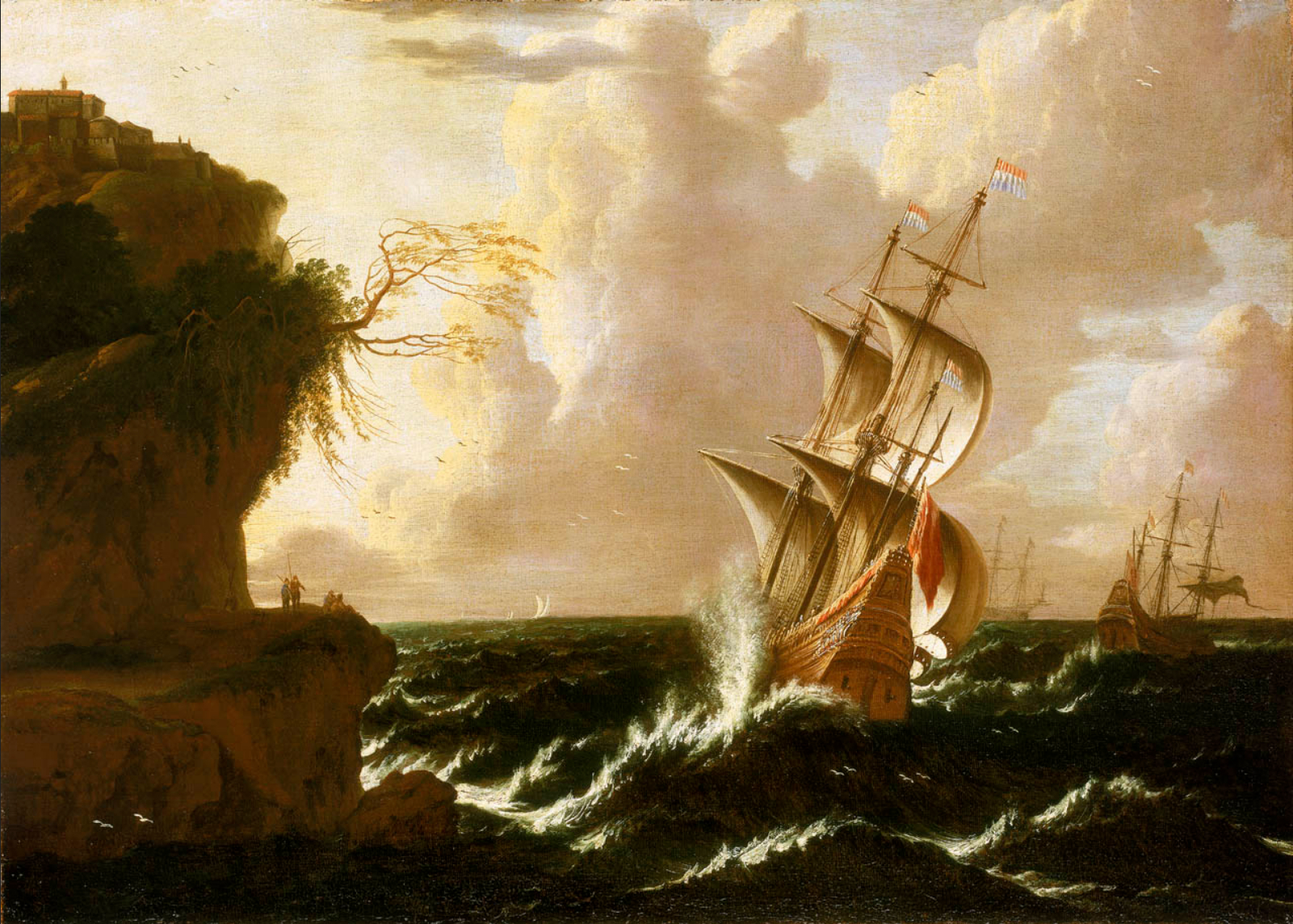
A Dutch ship in a storm

In France, van Plattenberg called himself 'Matthieu (de) Platte-Montaigne' or 'Platte-Montagne' and also signed his works with '(M) Montagne' or '(M) Montaigne'. Plattenberg's success gained him favour at the royal court and he was awarded the title of 'Peintre du Roy pour les mers' (Royal painter of seas'). He was one of the founding members in 1648 of the Académie Royale de Peinture et de Sculpture and remained a member until his death in Paris in the year 1660.

The son of Matthieu van Plattenberg, known as Nicolas de Plattemontagne, was a painter and a pupil of Philippe de Champaigne. He had a very successful career in France but his work fell into oblivion after his death.

== Work ==
Plattenberg specialized in depictions of vividly coloured storms with turbulent, foaming seas. Van Plattenberg seldom signed or dated his works.

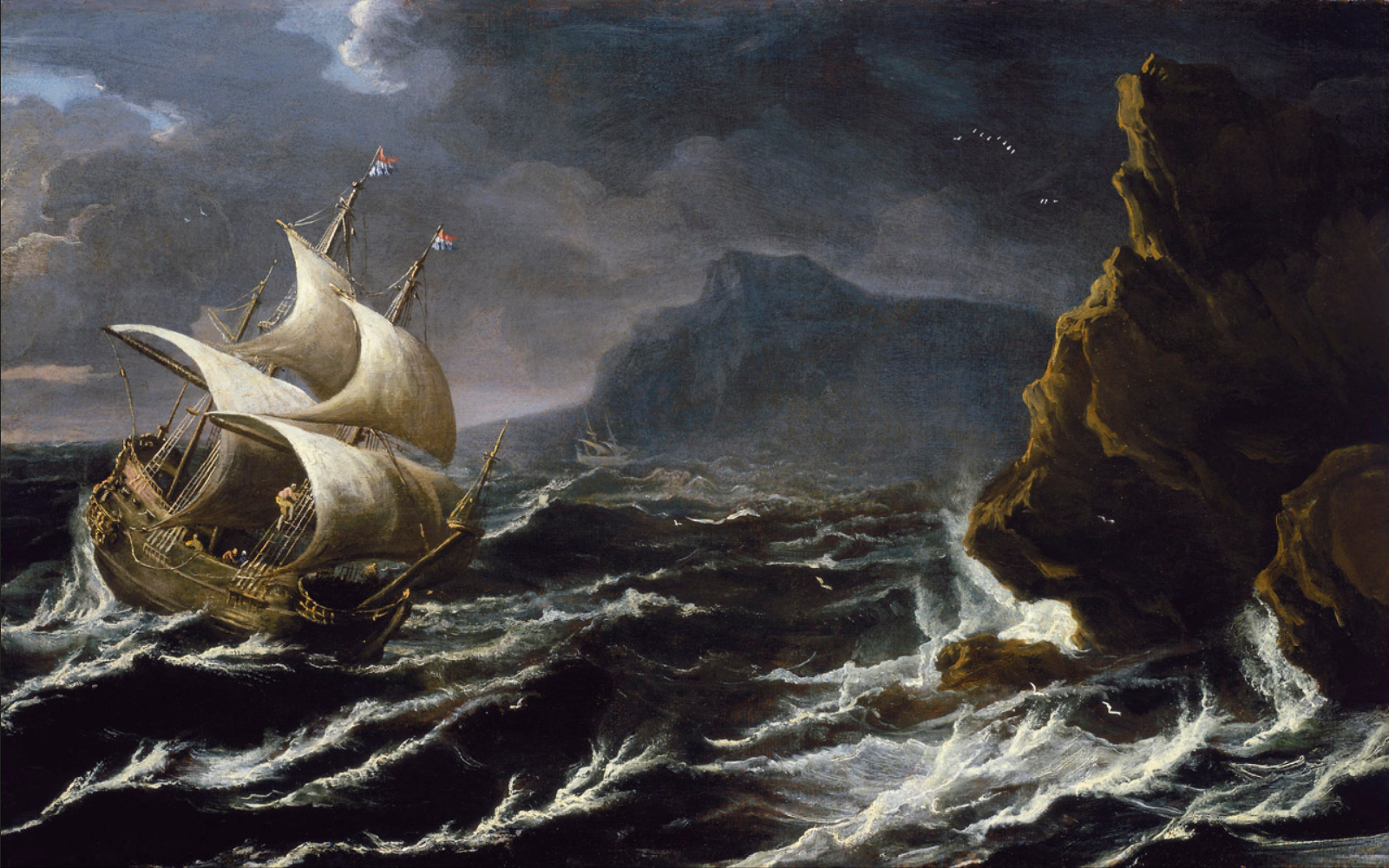
Dutch Ship Running on to a Rocky Coast

His work has in the past been wrongly attributed to a presumed Flemish or Dutch painter active in Italy around the time when van Plattenberg was working there. This painter was referred to as 'Monsù Montagna' or 'Renaud de la Montagne'. The art historian Marcel Roethlisberger has compared several dozen unsigned paintings of sea storms that traditionally were attributed to Monsù Montagna. He found that these paintings form a consistent group in that they combine Flemish types with a broad painterly treatment resembling the work of Salvator Rosa. Roethlisberger is of the view that these works formerly attributed to 'Monsù Montagna' are in fact works by van Plattenberg. Since Plattenberg left Italy before Rosa began to paint, any influence was likely from van Plattenberg to Rosa.

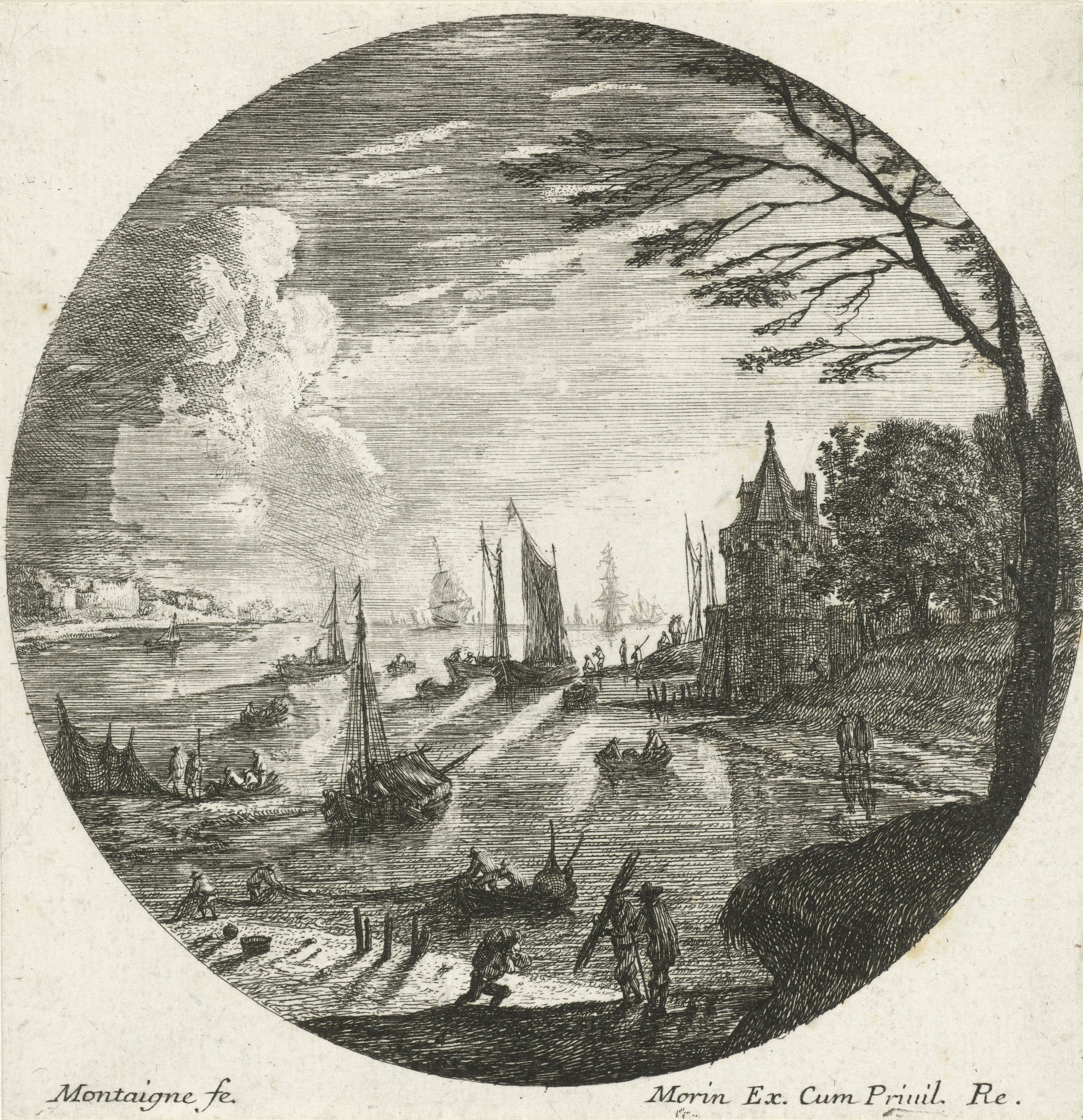
Landscape with Sunset

Van Plattenberg influenced the marine painter Allessandro Grevenbroeck, a painter of Dutch descent who was active in Northern Italy between 1717 and 1747. He is further considered an important precursor of Pieter Mulier, known in Italy where he was active for most of his life as 'Cavalier Pietro Tempesta'. Mulier was especially known for the stormy skies of his seascapes and Plattenberg's paintings are believed to anticipate Tempesta's early sea storms. Tempesta must have seen van Plattenberg's works in Italy. Some of the works of Monsù Montagna (Matthieu van Plattenberg) have in the past been attributed to Mulier. Van Plattenberg is also to be distinguished from Montagne of Venice (or Rinaldo della Montagna), who was also a marine painter mentioned by Cesare Malvasia in his biography of Guido Reni (p. 78).

Plattenberg also executed three dozen engravings depicting sea- and landscapes. These engravings were often published by his brother-in-law Jean Morin and were inscribed 'Morin ex cum privil. Re.'.
