= Jean Morin (artist) =

French painter

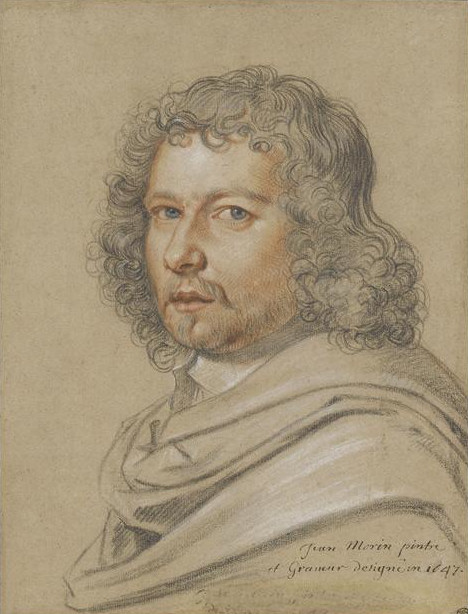
Jean Morin in 1647

Jean Morin (c.1595 or 1605 – 1650) was a French baroque painter, printmaker, painter, etcher, engraver and publisher. He is mainly remembered as a printmaker, whose innovation in combining engraving with etching on the same plate became extremely common.

== Life ==
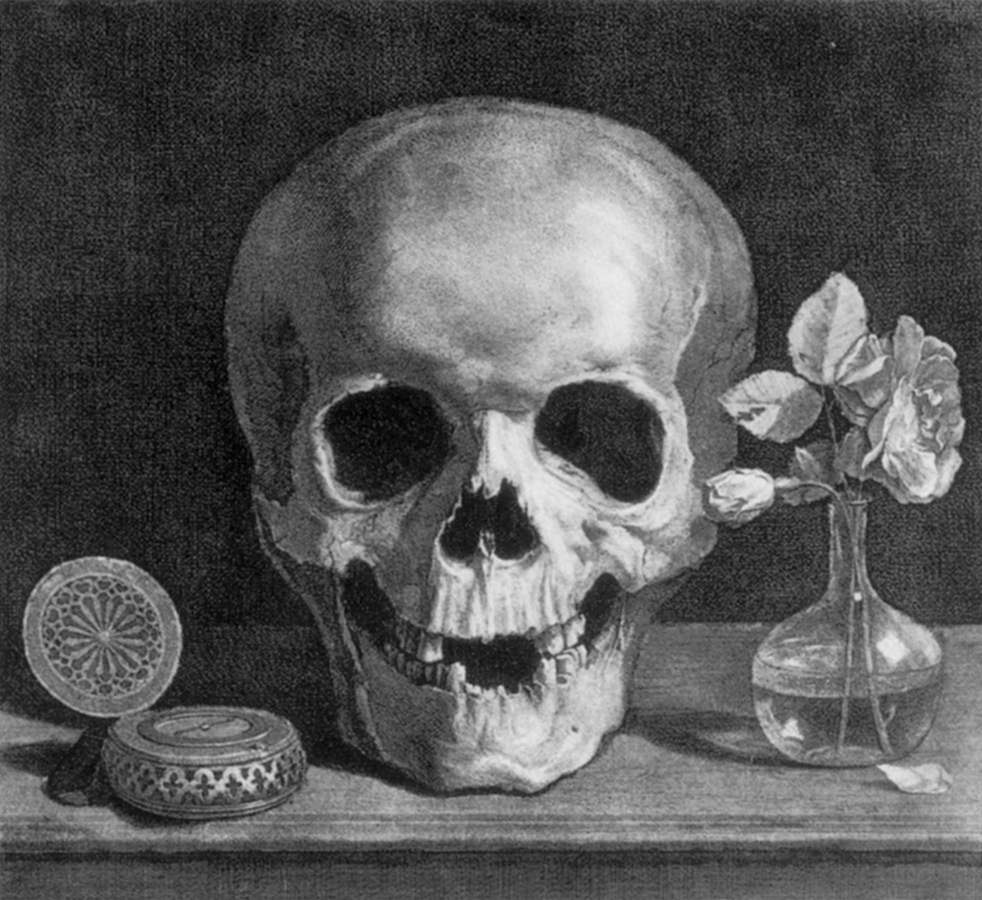
Memento Mori

Morin was born and died in Paris. His father Étienne Morin was a master painter who died young (circa 1612–1615). He was married to Marie Oignet (or Houegnet, Vanier, Wanier etc.) who was very likely Flemish. Jean had two sisters: Marie, who never married (1611–1703) and Catherine (near 1610–1672), who in 1631 married the Flemish painter and engraver Matthieu van Plattenberg, called Plattemontagne in France. Van Plattenberg was originally from Antwerp and became a founding member of the Royal Academy of Painting and Sculpture. Their son (and therefore nephew of Jean Morin) was the painter Nicolas de Plattemontagne who studied under Morin and Philippe de Champaigne.

Van Plattenberg and Morin worked together on various publications such as a series of landscapes and marine scenes.

Morin likely never married.

== Work ==
His graphic work consists of 118 plates, which are undated and the chronology of which is unknown. Six plates do not have his signature. The works include:

- 50 portraits
- 34 devotional subjects
- 20 landscapes
- 11 book illustrations
- 3 genre scenes.

Many of these works were made after paintings of leading artists of the time.

== Portraits after Philippe de Champaigne ==
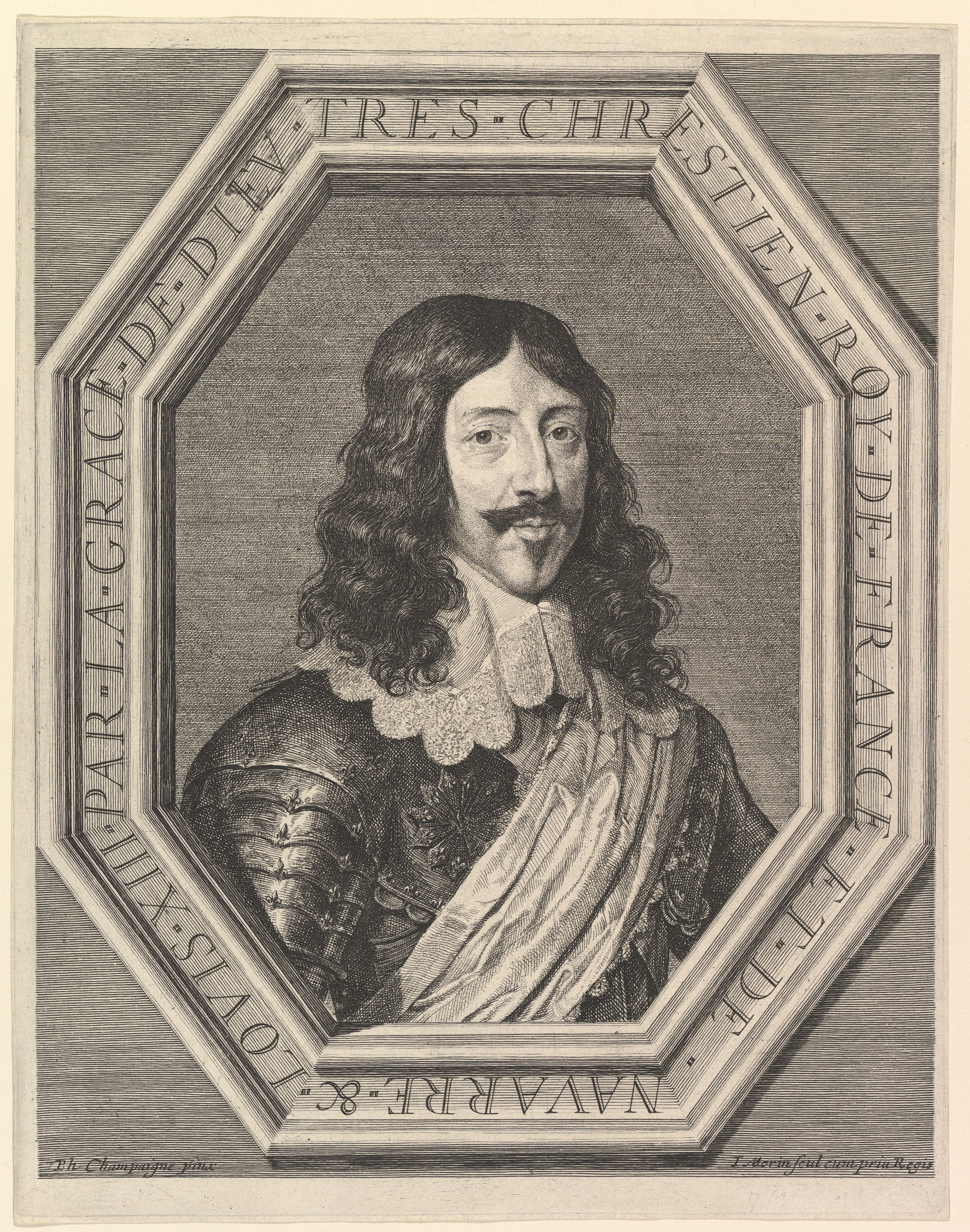
Louis XIII

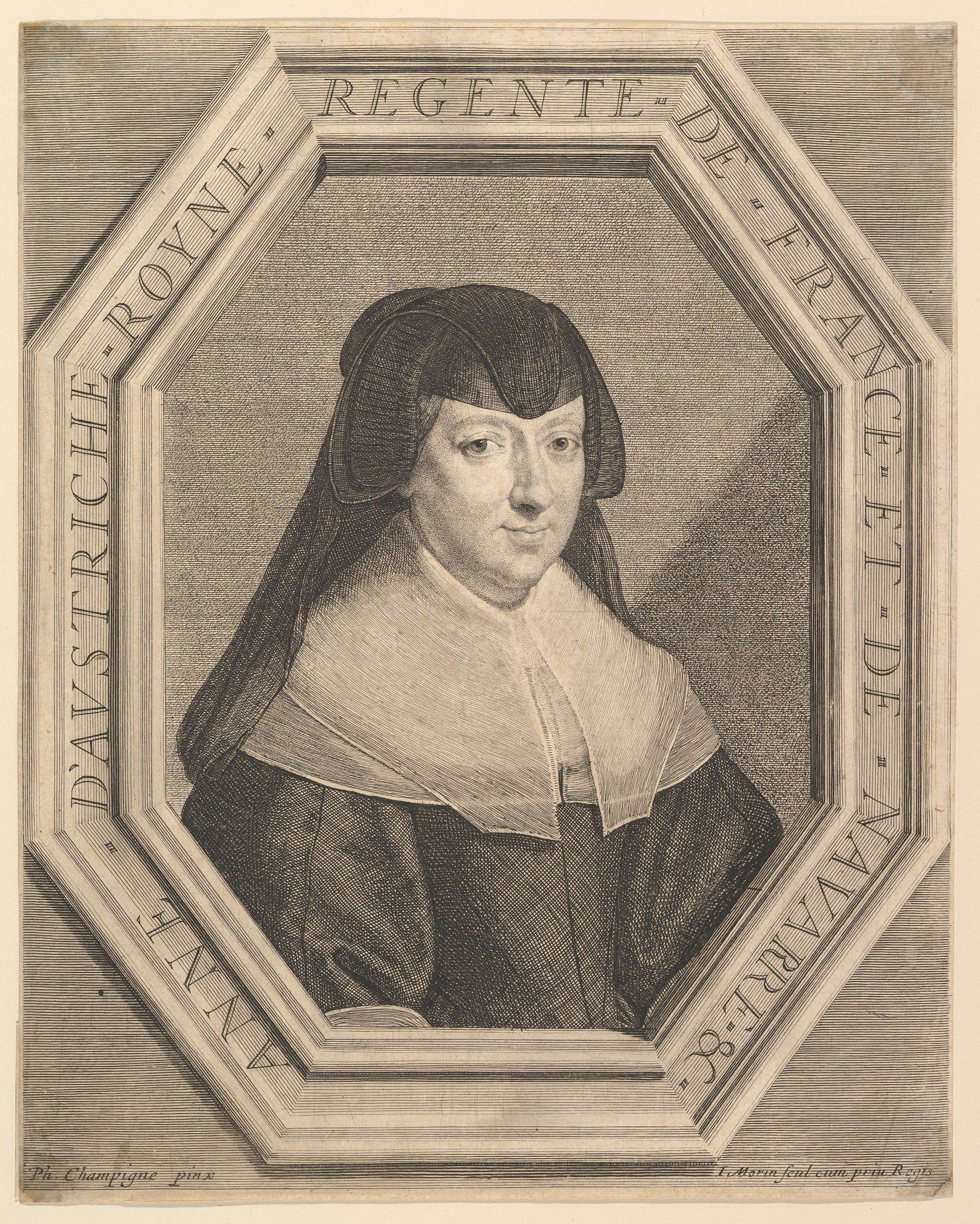
Anne d'Autriche

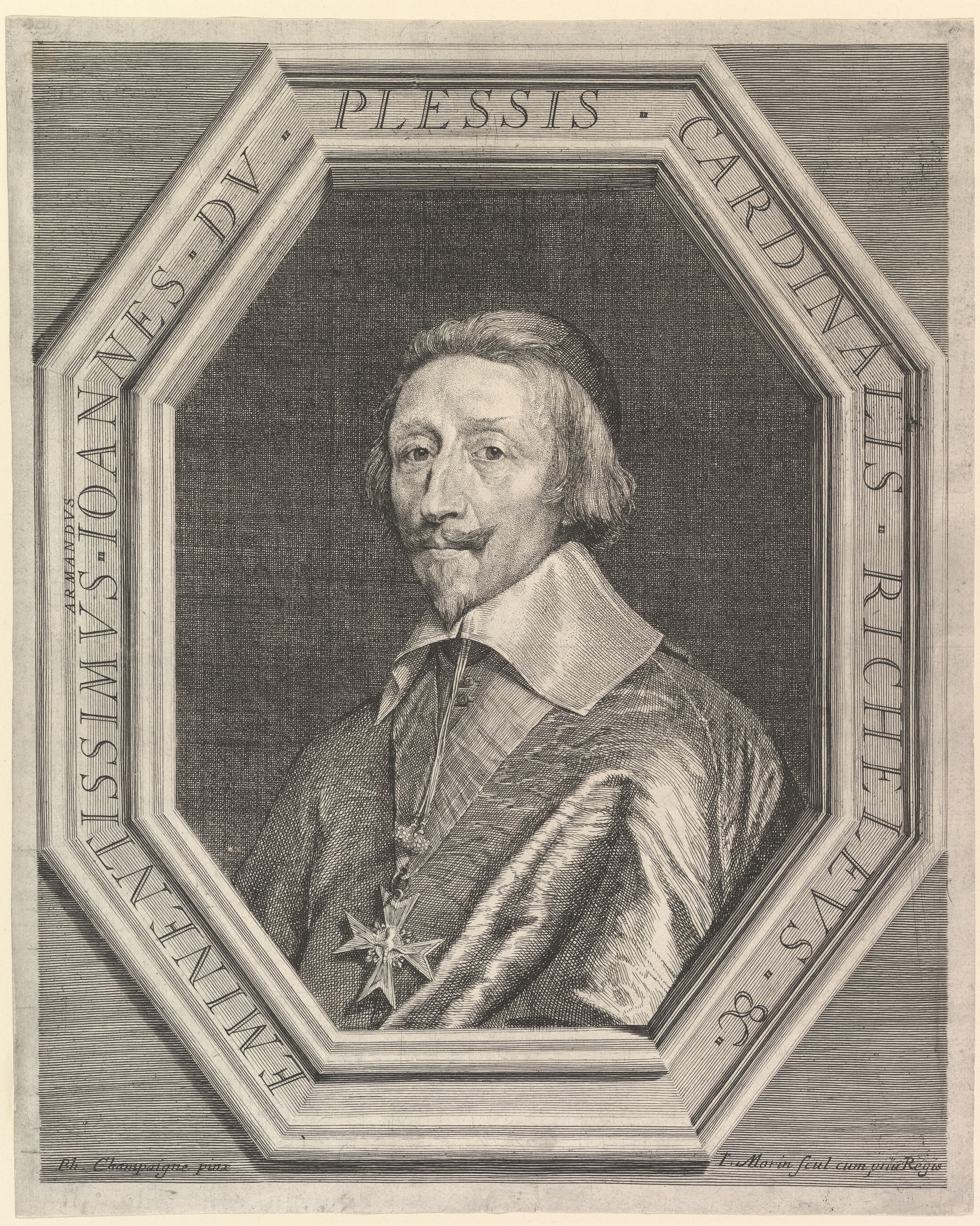
Cardinal Richelieu

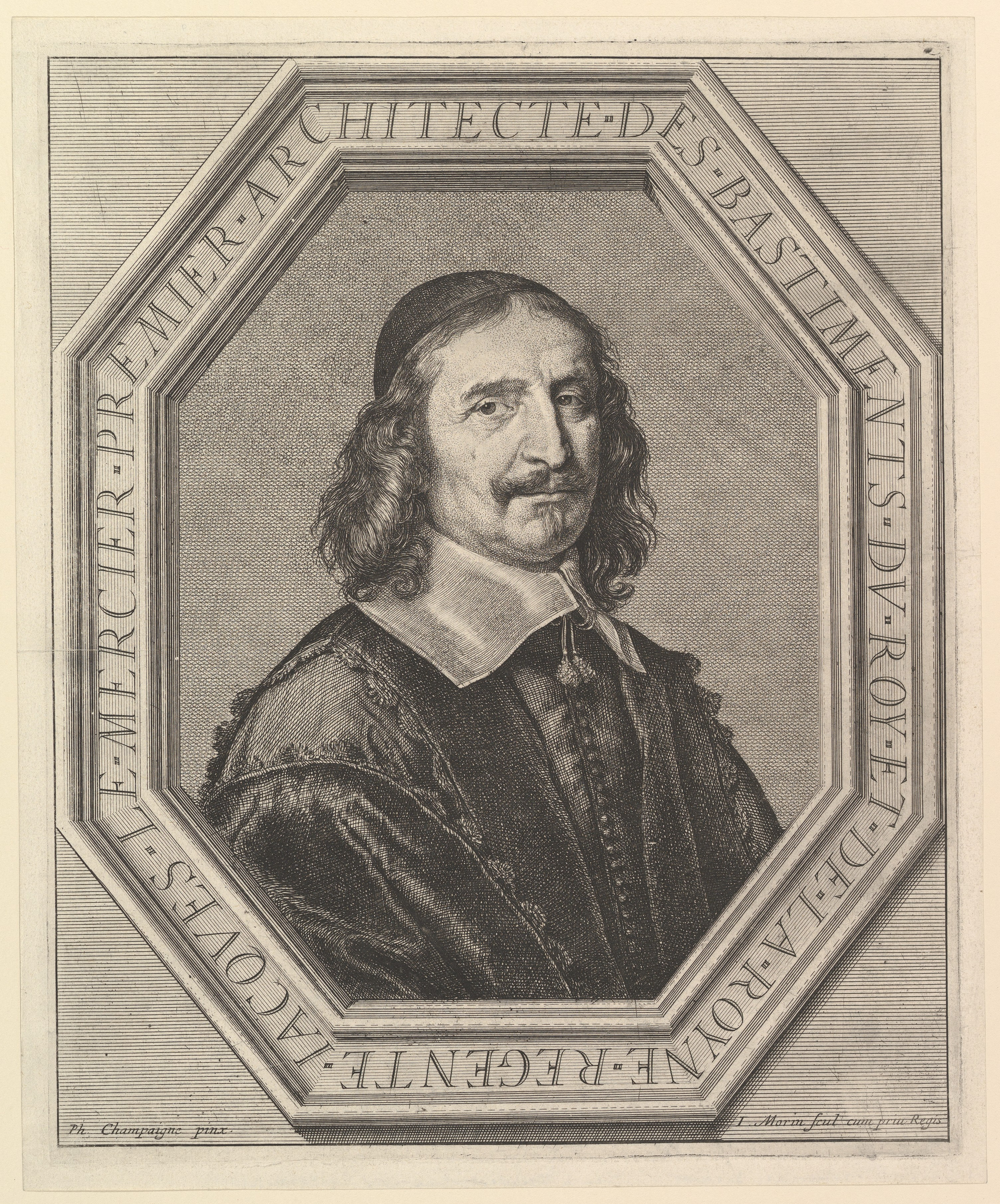
Jacques Lemercier

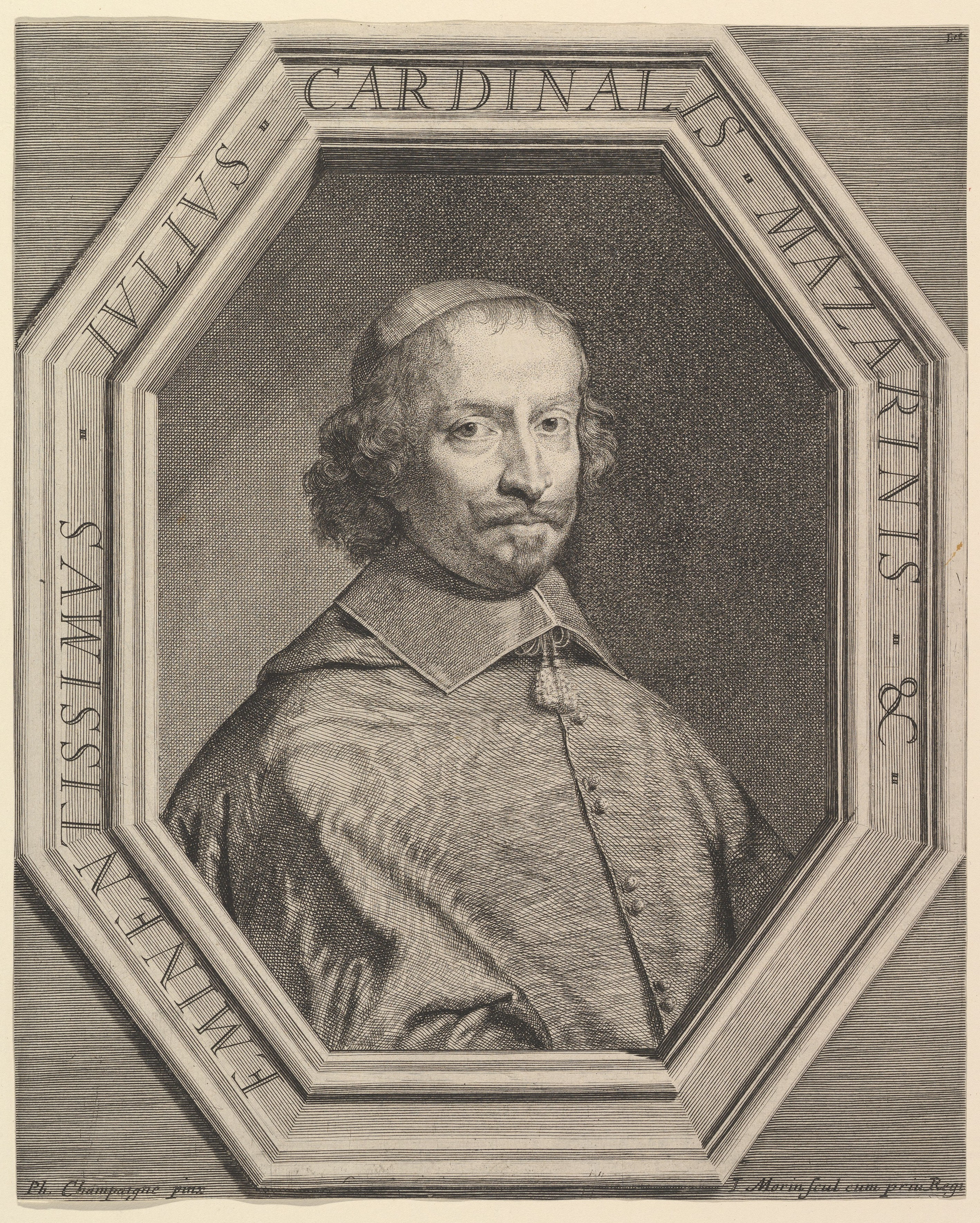
Cardinal Mazarin

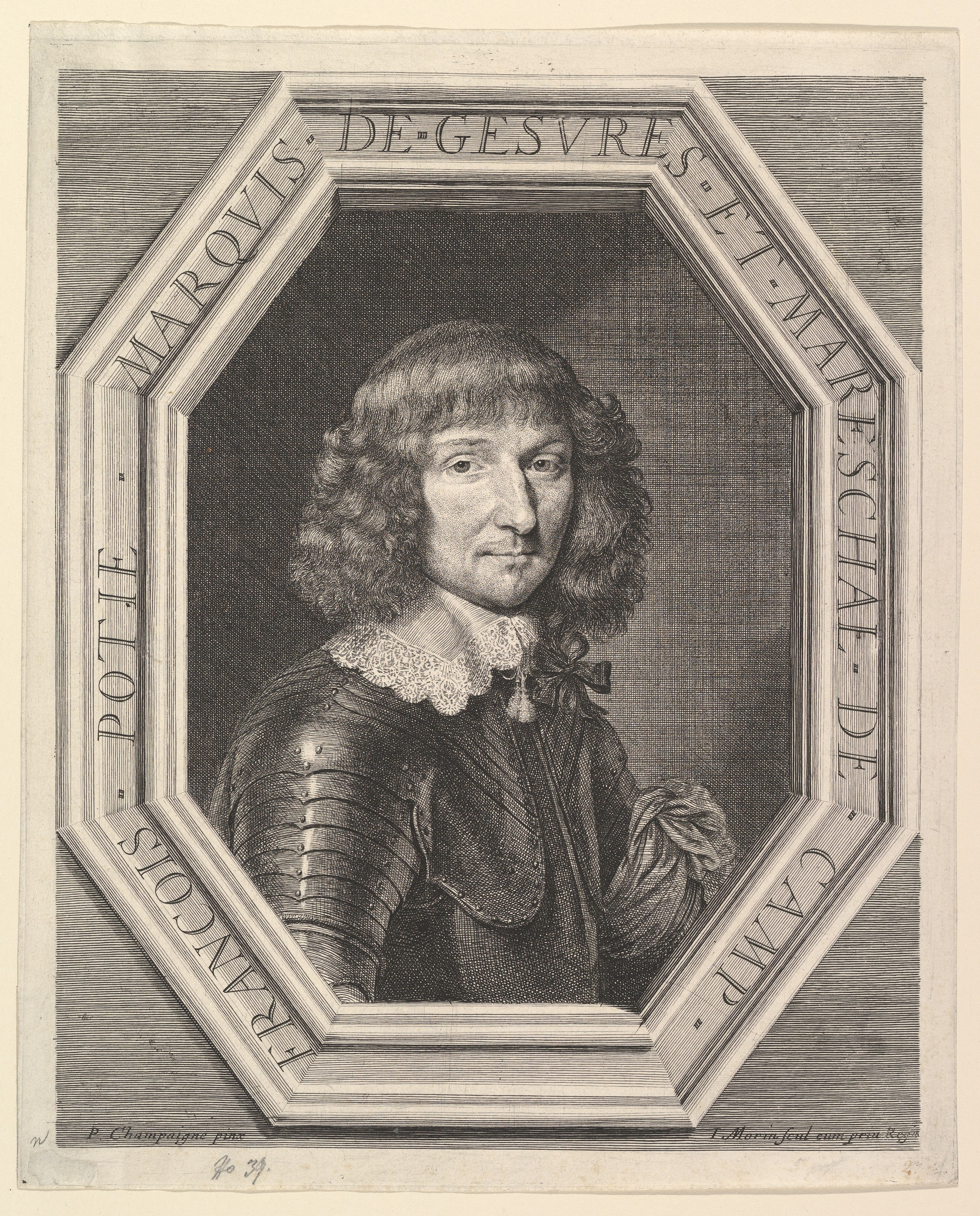
François Potier

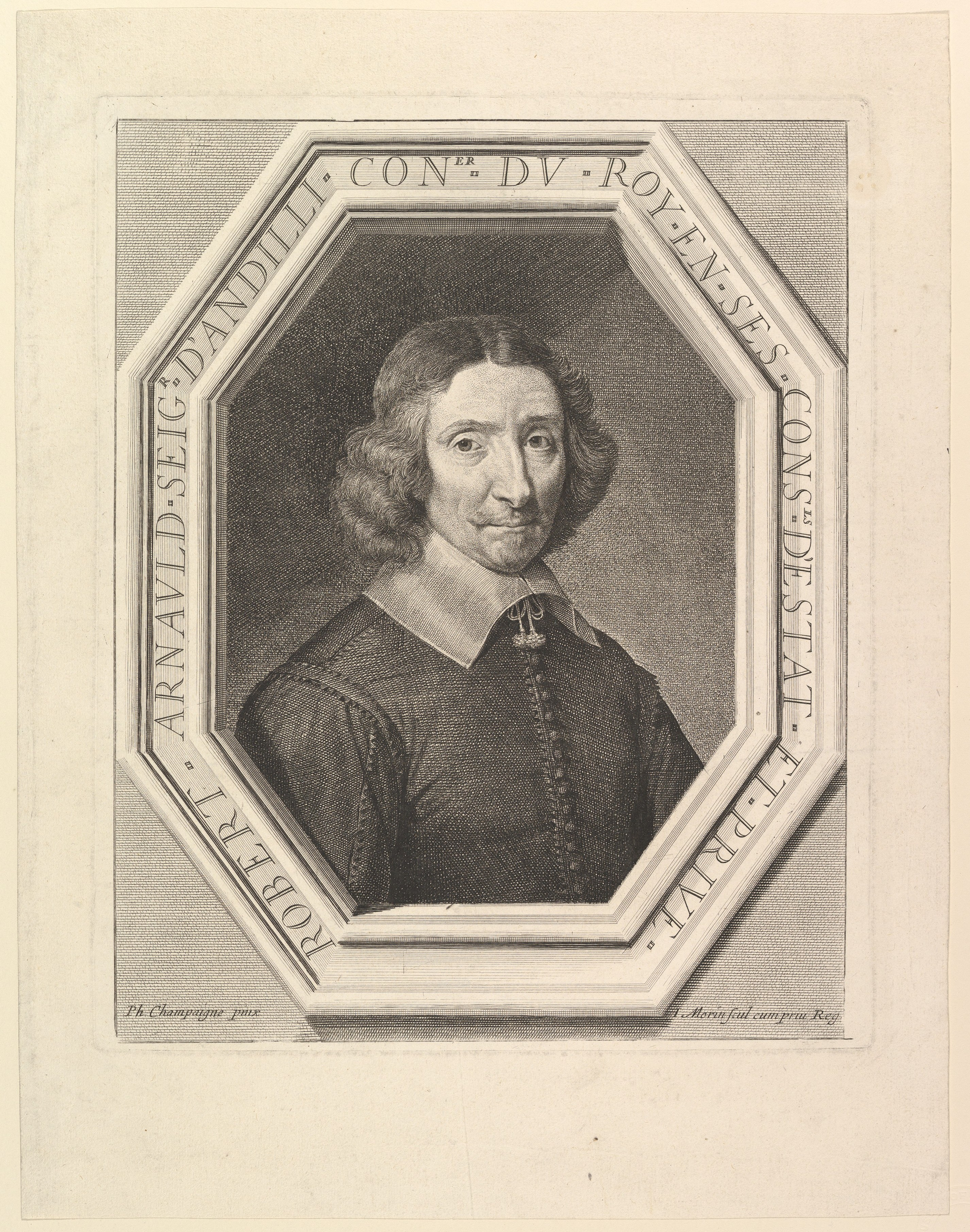
Arnaud d'Andilly

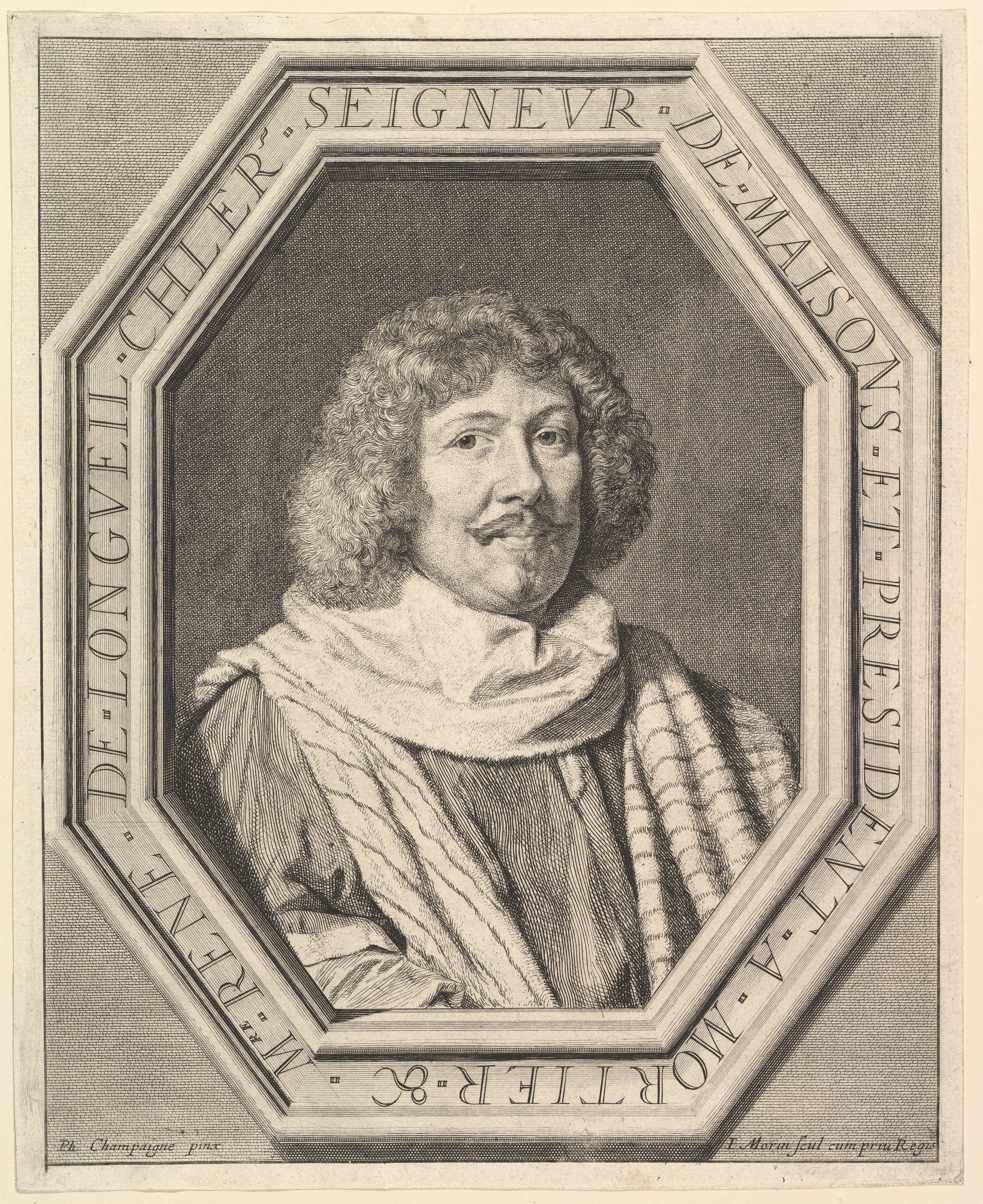
Rene de Longueil

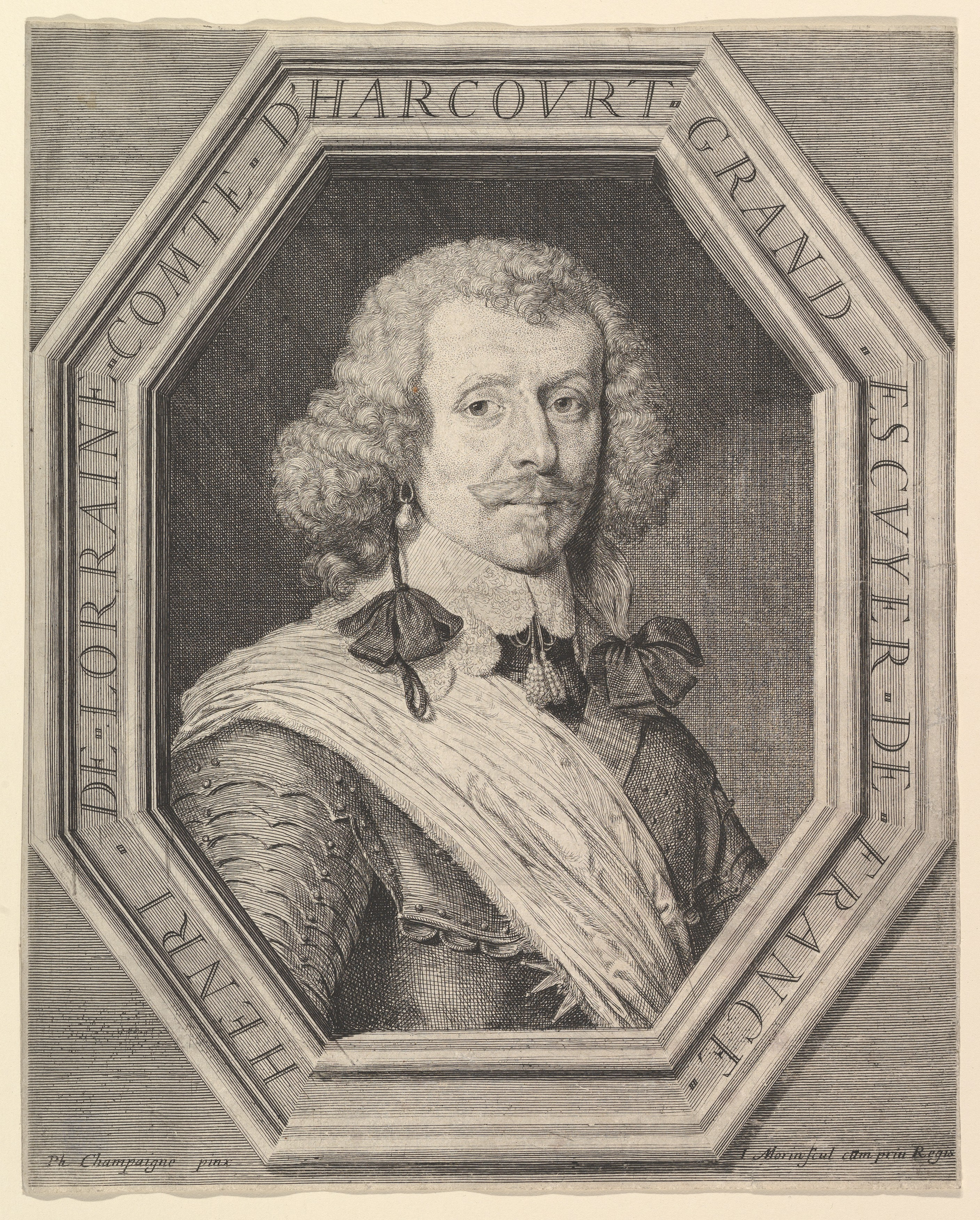
Henri de Lorraine

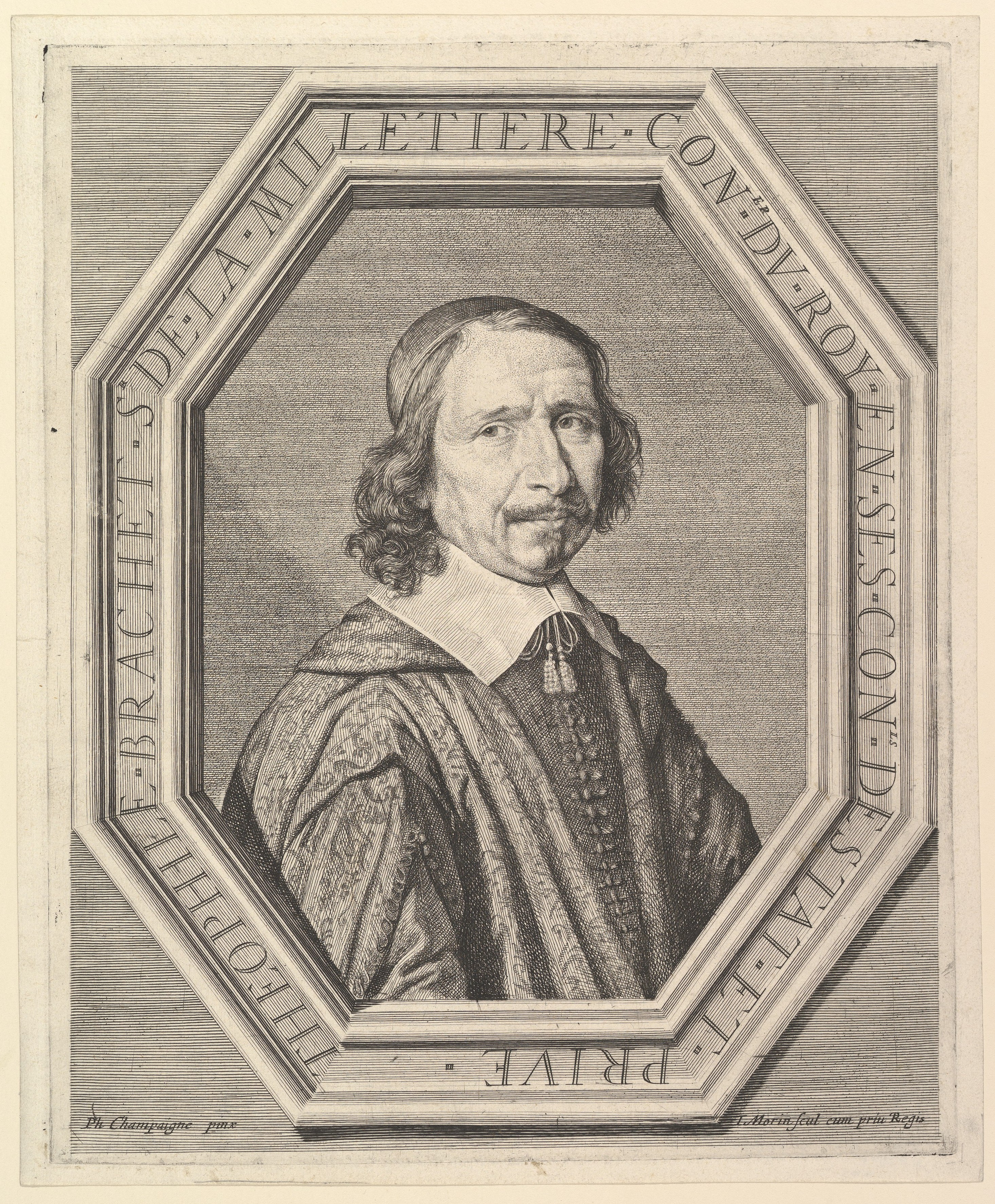
Theophile Brachet de la Milletiere

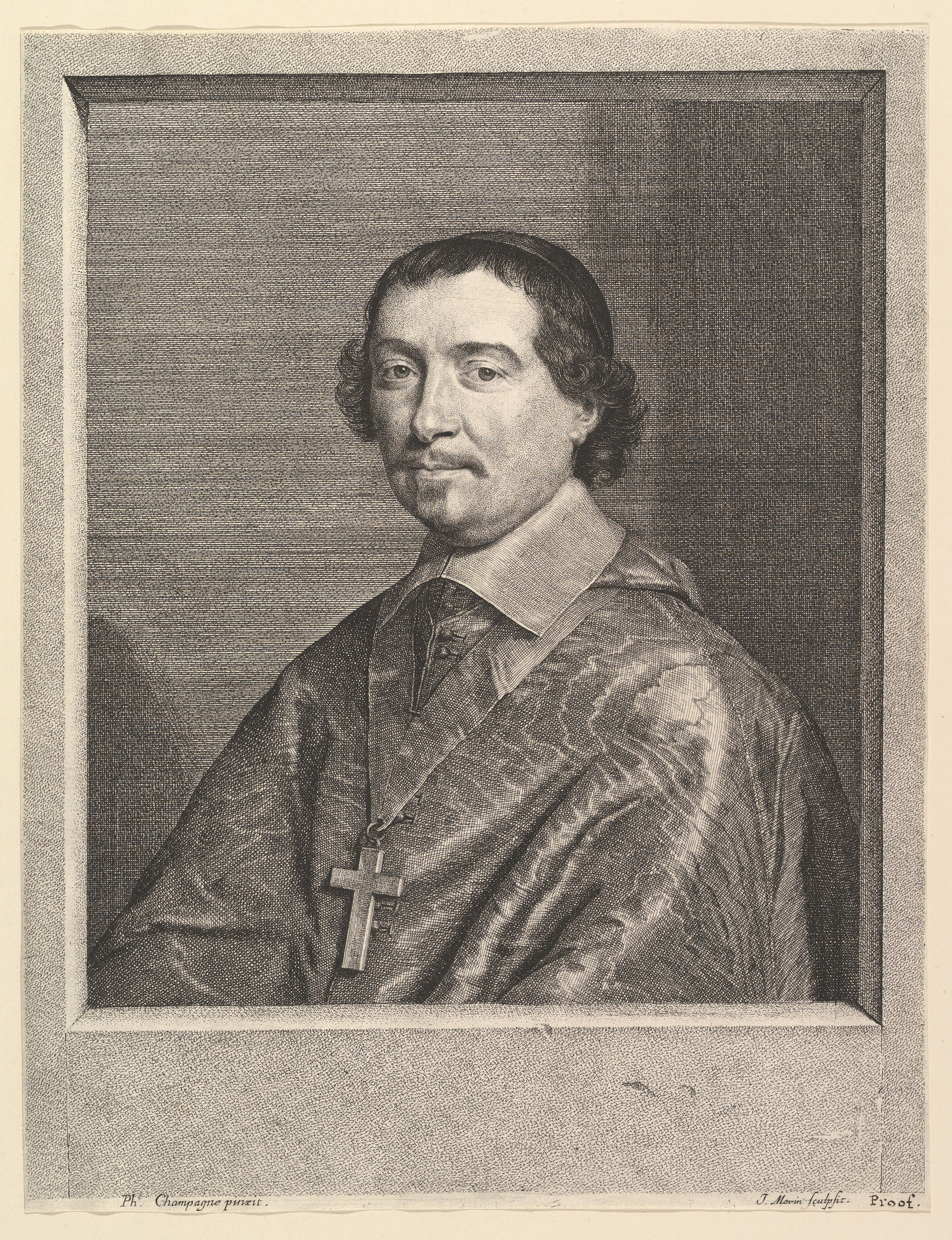
Pierre Bartier, Bishop of Montauban

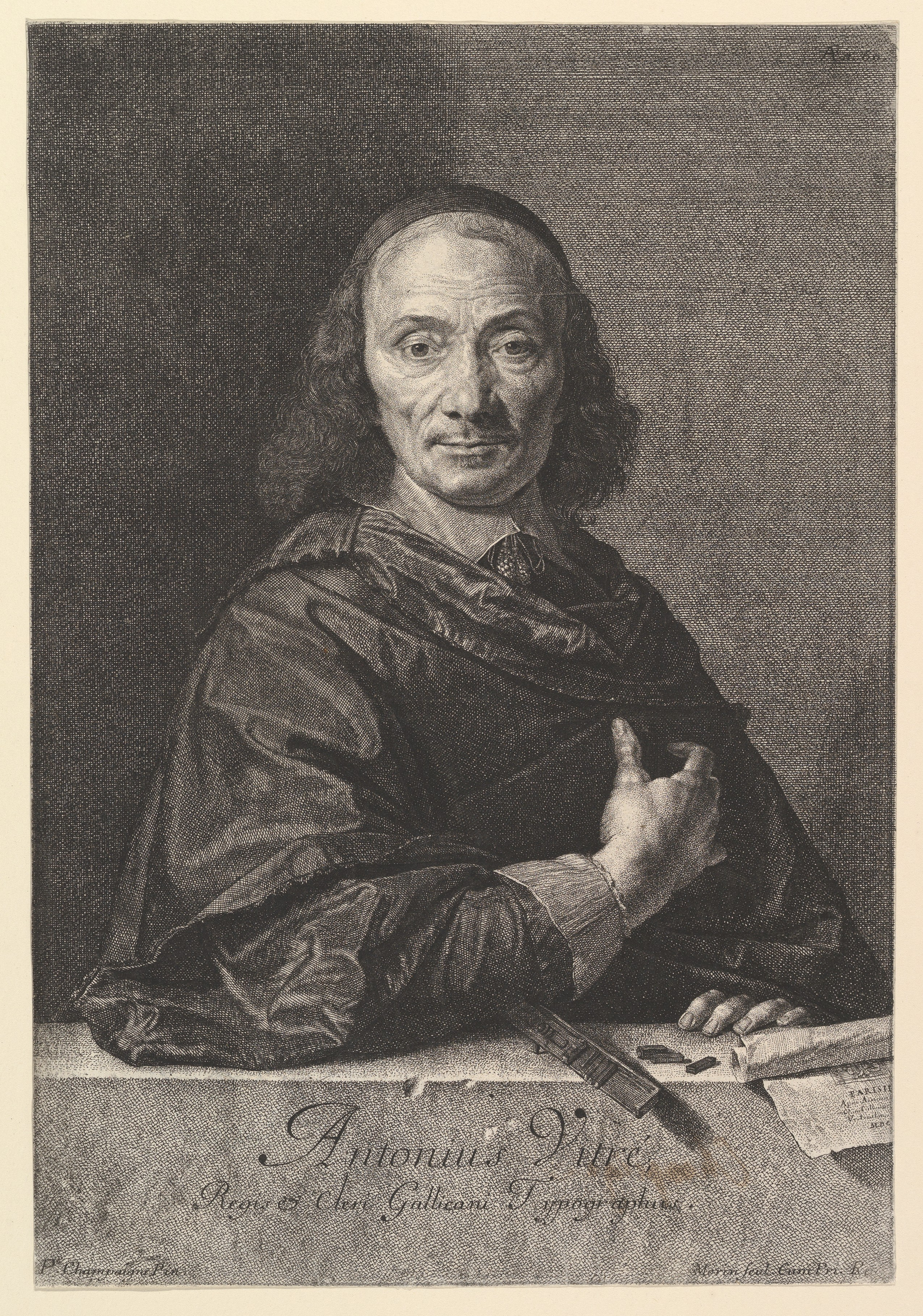
Antoine Vitre
