= Het Gulden Cabinet =

Book by Cornelis de Bie

Het Gulden Cabinet vande Edel Vry Schilder-const
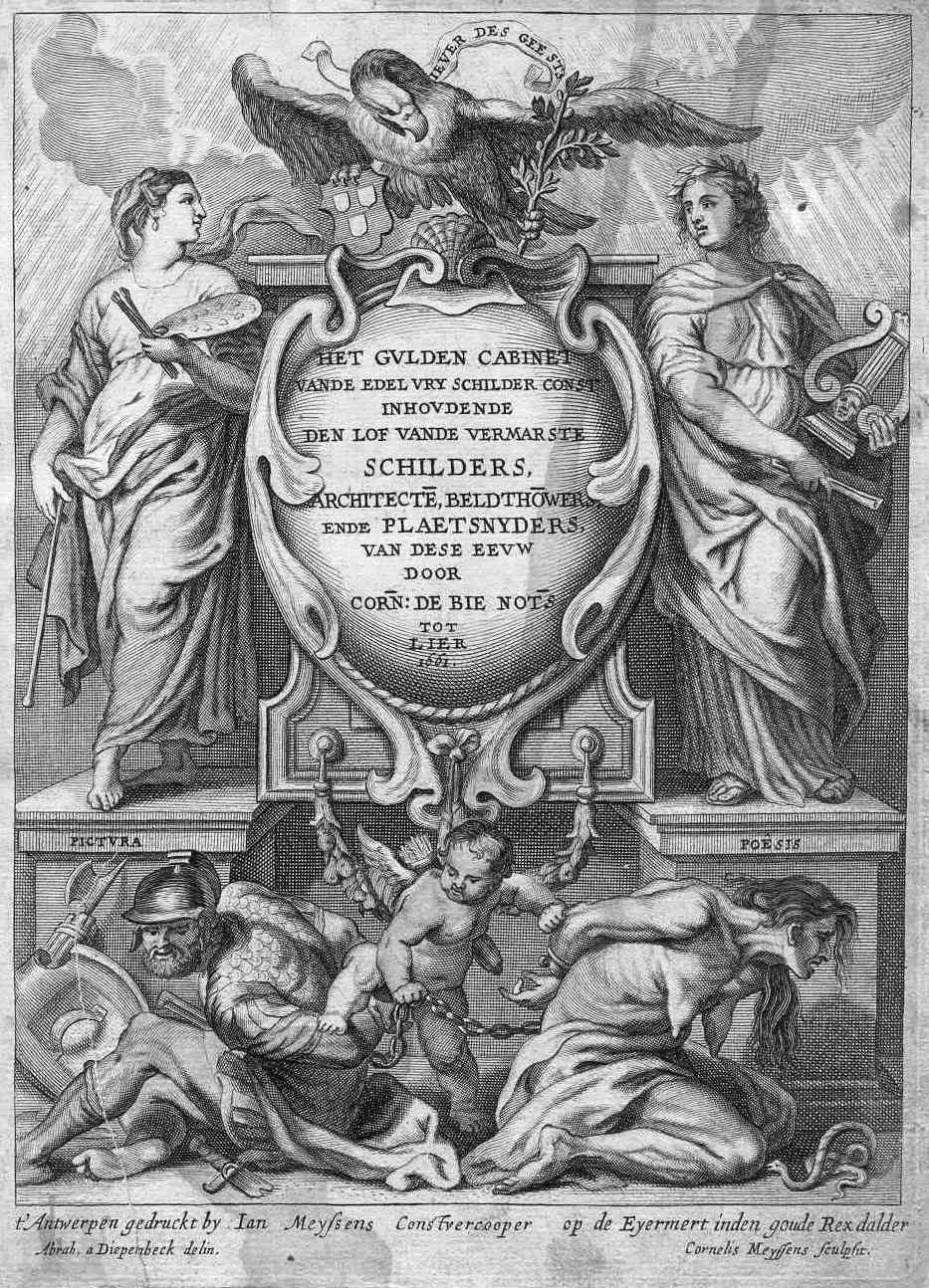
- Title page of the Gulden Cabinet
- Author: Cornelis de Bie
- Language: Dutch
- Subject: Artist biographies
- Publisher: Joannes Meyssens (1662)
- Publication date: 1662
- Publication place: Habsburg Netherlands

Het Gulden Cabinet vande Edel Vry Schilder-Const or The Golden Cabinet of the Noble Liberal Art of Painting is a book by the 17th-century Flemish notary and rederijker Cornelis de Bie. It was published in Antwerp. Written in the Dutch language, it contains artist biographies and panegyrics with engraved portraits of 16th- and 17th-century artists, predominantly from the Habsburg Netherlands. The work is a very important source of information on the artists it describes. It formed the principal source of information for later art historians such as Arnold Houbraken and Jacob Campo Weyerman. It was published in 1662, although the work also mentions 1661 as date of publication.

== Background ==
Het Gulden Cabinet stands in a long tradition of artist biographies. This tradition goes back to Pliny and was revived during the Renaissance. In 1550, the Italian Giorgio Vasari published his Vite on the lives of famous artists. Karel van Mander was the first author to introduce this genre in the Dutch language with his Schilder-boeck of 1604. Cornelis de Bie explicitly placed himself in the tradition of van Mander and did what van Mander did for 15th and 16th Netherlandish artists for 17th-century artists.

In his Het Gulden Cabinet, de Bie presents himself as a rederijker whose duty it is to broadcast the fame of the artists. By doing so he followed an existing tradition already seen in Dominicus Lampsonius' 1572 Pictorum aliquot celebrium Germaniae Inferioris effigies and the Antwerp painter and rederijker Alexander van Fornenbergh's 1658 Antwerpschen Proteus ofte Cyclopschen Apelles, which sang the praises of the painter Quinten Matsys.

The concept of Het Gulden Cabinet did not come from Cornelis de Bie himself, but from the Antwerp printer Joannes Meyssens. In 1649 Meyssens had already published Image de divers hommes, which contained engraved portraits of famous men, including painters, in imitation of Anthony van Dyck's Iconography. Most of the artist portraits in Het Gulden Cabinet are taken from this Image de divers hommes and only a few new engravings were made especially for de Bie's work.

== The work ==
=== General ===
The full title of the work is Het gulden cabinet vande edel vry schilder const: inhoudende den lof vande vermarste schilders, architecten, beldthouwers ende plaetsnyders, van dese eeuw, which translates as The Golden Cabinet of the Noble Liberal Art of Painting: Containing the Praise of the Most Famous Painters, Architects, Sculptors and Engravers of This Century. Despite its title, the book also deals with artists from the 16th century.

The work was dedicated to the Antwerp art collector Antoon van Leyen who had provided some of the information for the book and may also have helped finance the publication. Other persons who had provided information on contemporary artists included de Bie’s own father, Erasmus Quellinus II, Luigi Primo and Hendrick ter Brugghen’s son Richard.

=== Structure and style ===
The book has three parts. The first deals with artists who had died before de Bie's time and relies heavily on van Mander's Schilder-boeck. The second part deals with artists living at the time of de Bie and is mostly based on original research by de Bie and on the comments added to the engravings borrowed from Meyssens' Image de divers hommes. The third part deals with artists who had been omitted in the first two parts and also includes engravers, sculptors, architects, and painters. A general treatise on the art of painting is woven into the entire work.

The book is mainly written in verse, some of them in Latin, and is as a result rather difficult to read today. There are also some prose sections. It is over 500 pages long and contains engravings of more than 50 painters derived mainly from Meyssens' earlier work.

== Influence ==
While The Gulden Cabinet never gained the level of popularity of van Mander’s Schilder-boeck, it is an important source of information on Flemish artists of the 17th century. De Bie’s most important contribution was to provide a theoretical basis for his appreciation of (then) less valued painting genres such as still lifes, genre painting, portraits and landscapes. He unreservedly praised the artists who practised in these genres.

Het Gulden Cabinet is included in the Basic Library of the Digital Library for Dutch Literature, which contains 1000 works of Dutch-language literature from the Middle Ages to today, which are deemed by its compilers to be of particular importance to Dutch-language literature.

== Second edition ==
De Bie seems to have planned a second edition of the work, but this was never published. The hand-written manuscript of de Bie is still extant and is kept at the Royal Library of Belgium. The manuscript is dated 1672. In it de Bie mentioned his intention to have a second edition published. The reason why the second edition was never published is unclear. It may have been due to the fact that the publisher and promoter of the first edition Joannes Meyssens had died in 1670 and de Bie had difficulty finding another publisher.

== Historical reliability ==
Like Vasari and Van Mander before him, de Bie's biographies are interspersed with amusing anecdotes. Although such literary motifs belong to a long rhetorical tradition, many of these stories were labelled "historically unreliable" by leading historians in the 19th century. Only recently have some of the stories been reinstated. Since the book was often the only surviving source of information on certain painters, these stories have often been repeated as hard facts about the lives of the painters described.

For instance, Cornelis de Bie postulates certain apprenticeships, which are now considered improbable because the pupil painted in a completely different genre than the teacher. De Bie's statement that Philips Wouwerman trained with Frans Hals was deemed implausible by later historians since Wouwerman painted landscapes with horses and Hals was principally a portrait painter. Some scholars still consider this apprenticeship as unlikely, but in view of Hals' large workshop it cannot be entirely excluded.

== Artists in Het Gulden Cabinet, Part I ==
The engraved portraits included as illustrations in Book I are below, followed by the artists listed in order of appearance in the text. The first illustration is of Antoon van Leyen, to whom the book is dedicated.

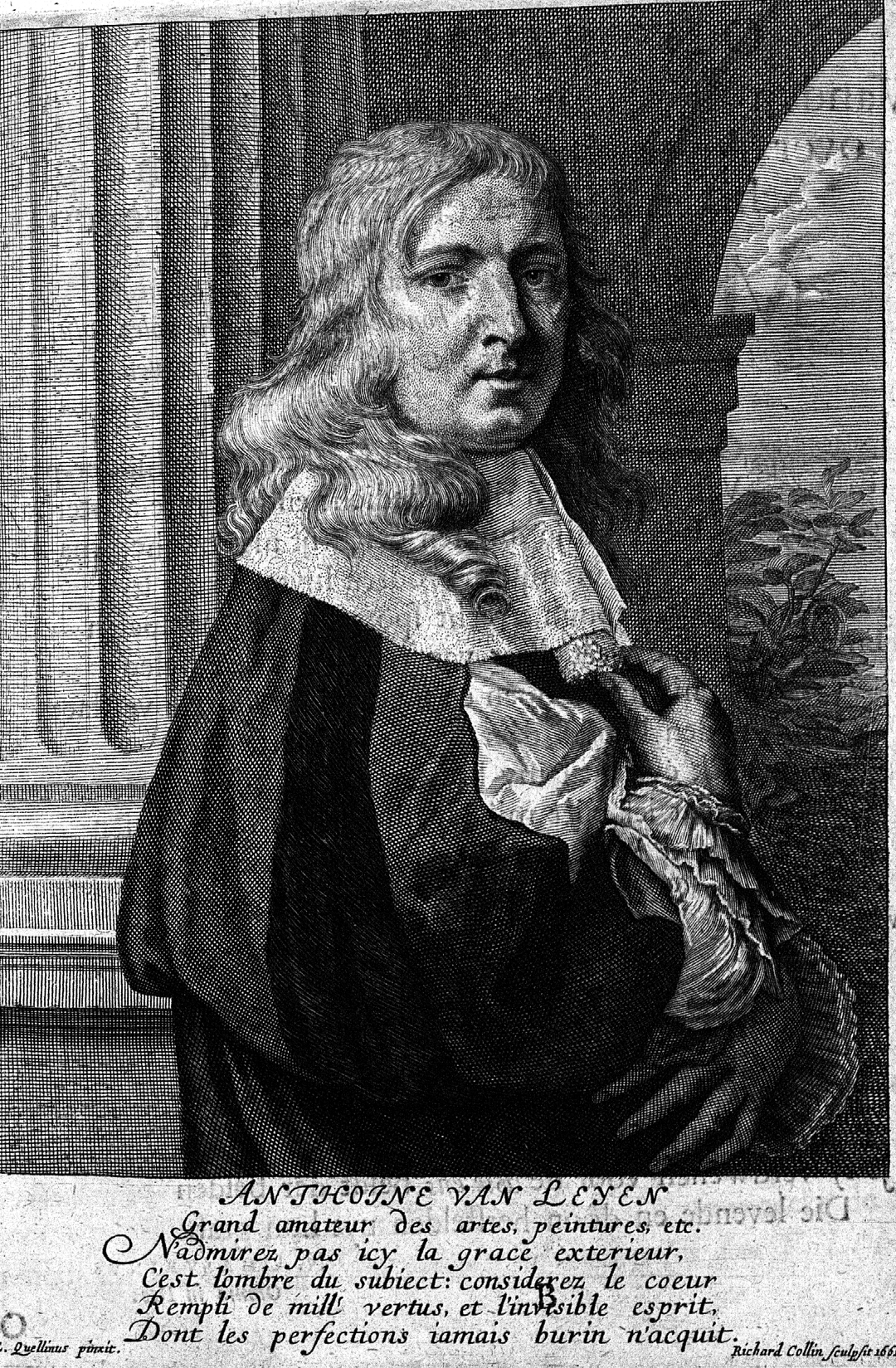
Anthoine van Leyen, page 9

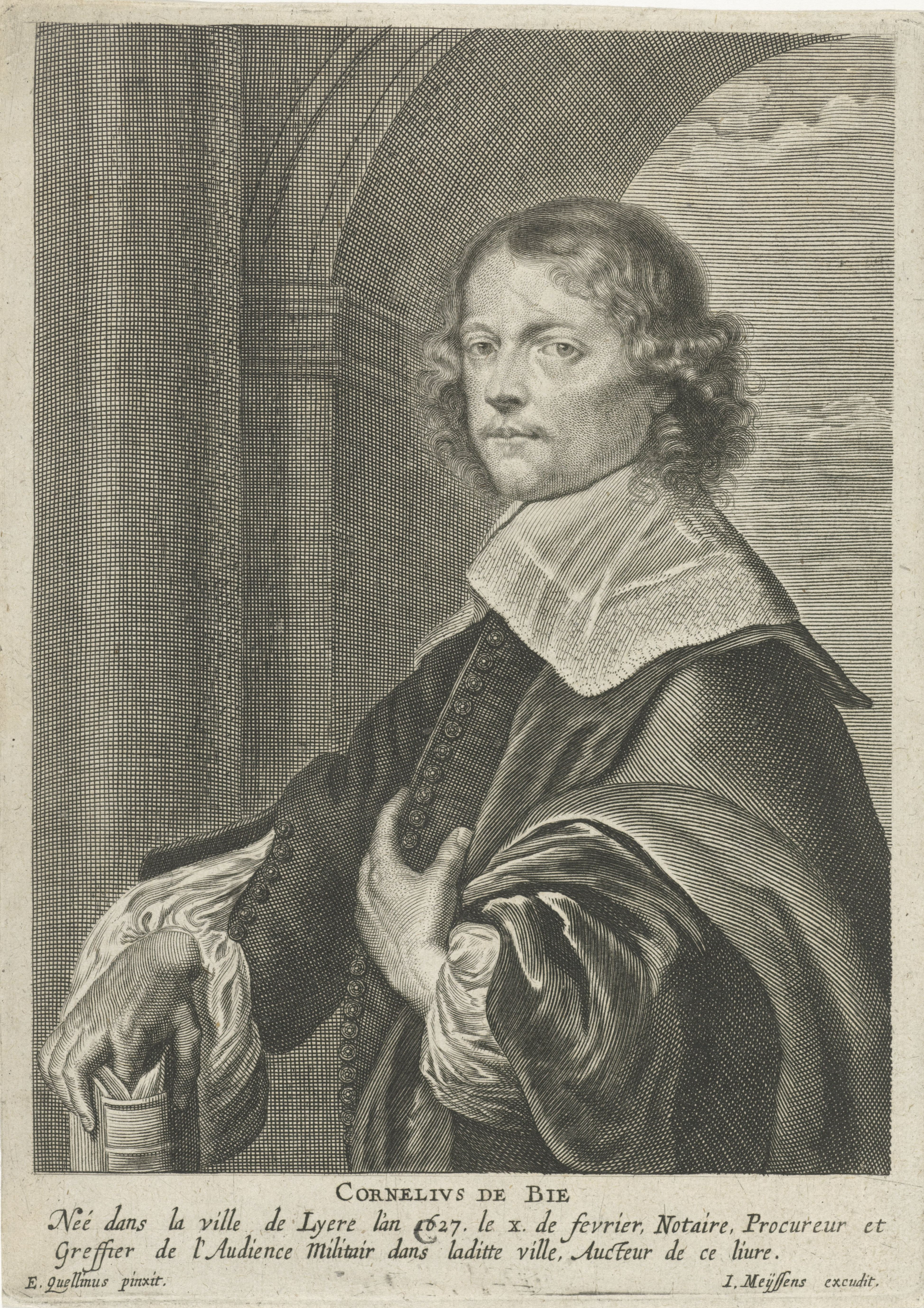
Cornelis de Bie, page 17

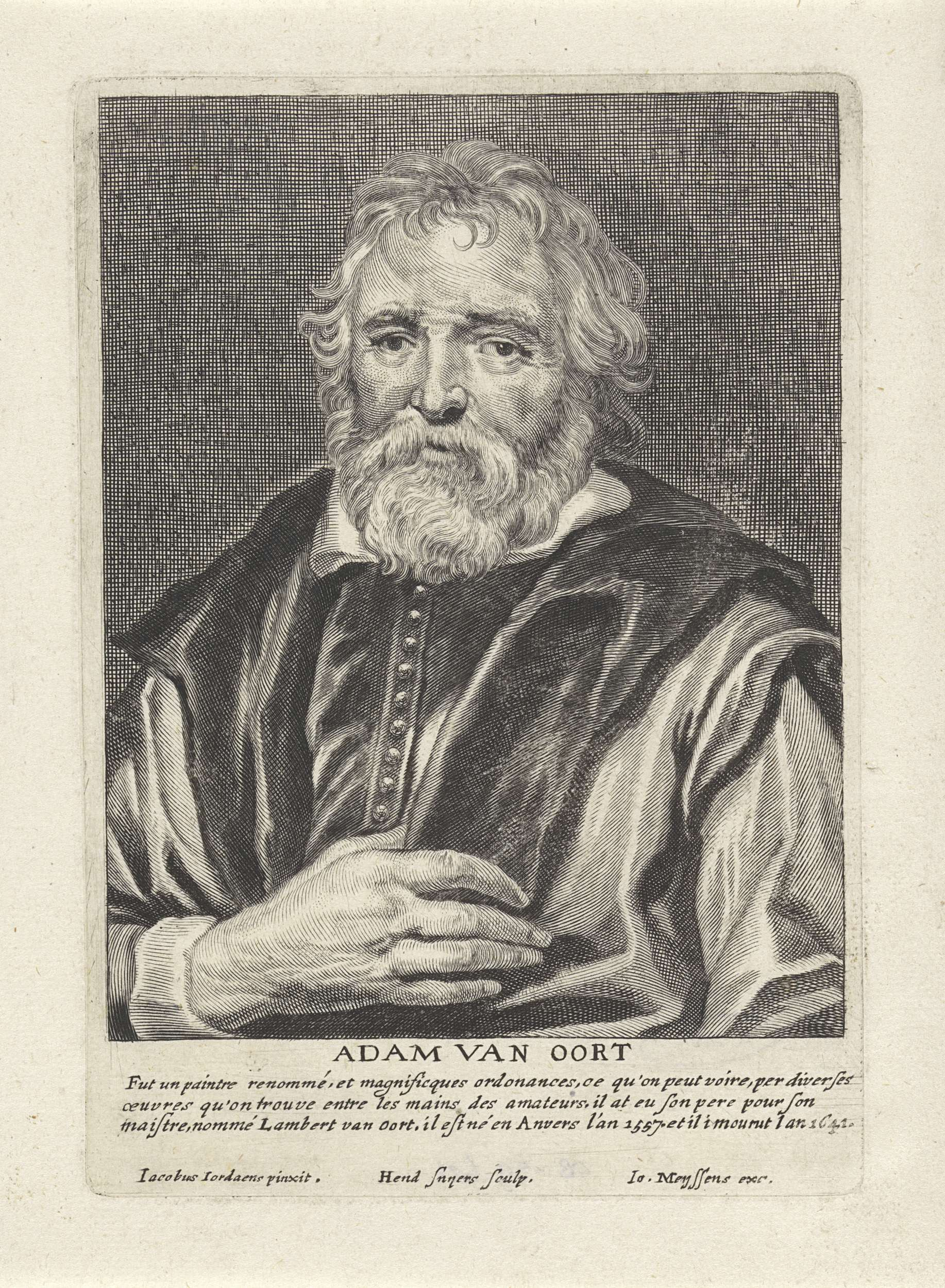
Adam van Oort, page 37

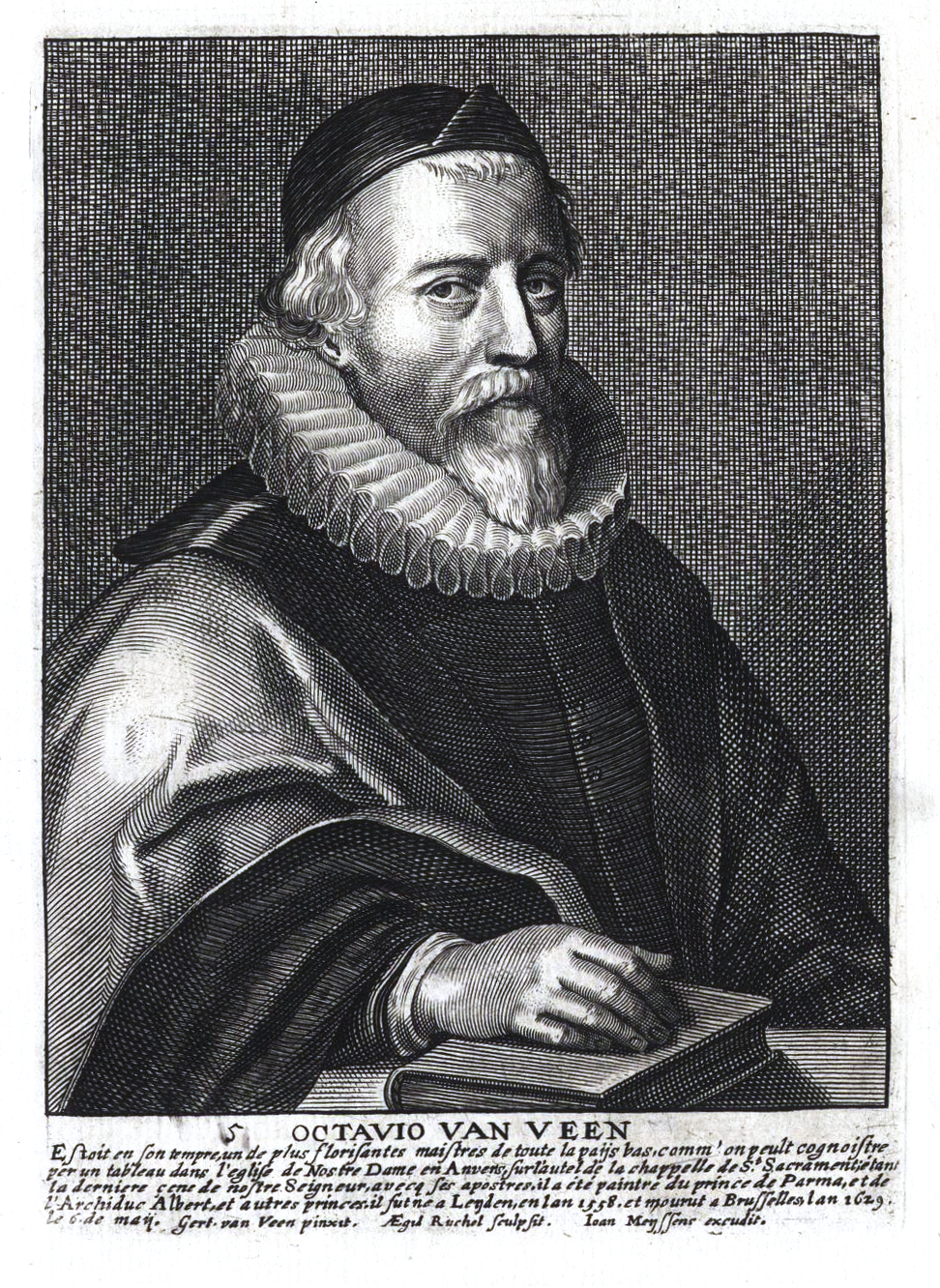
Octavio van Veen, page 39

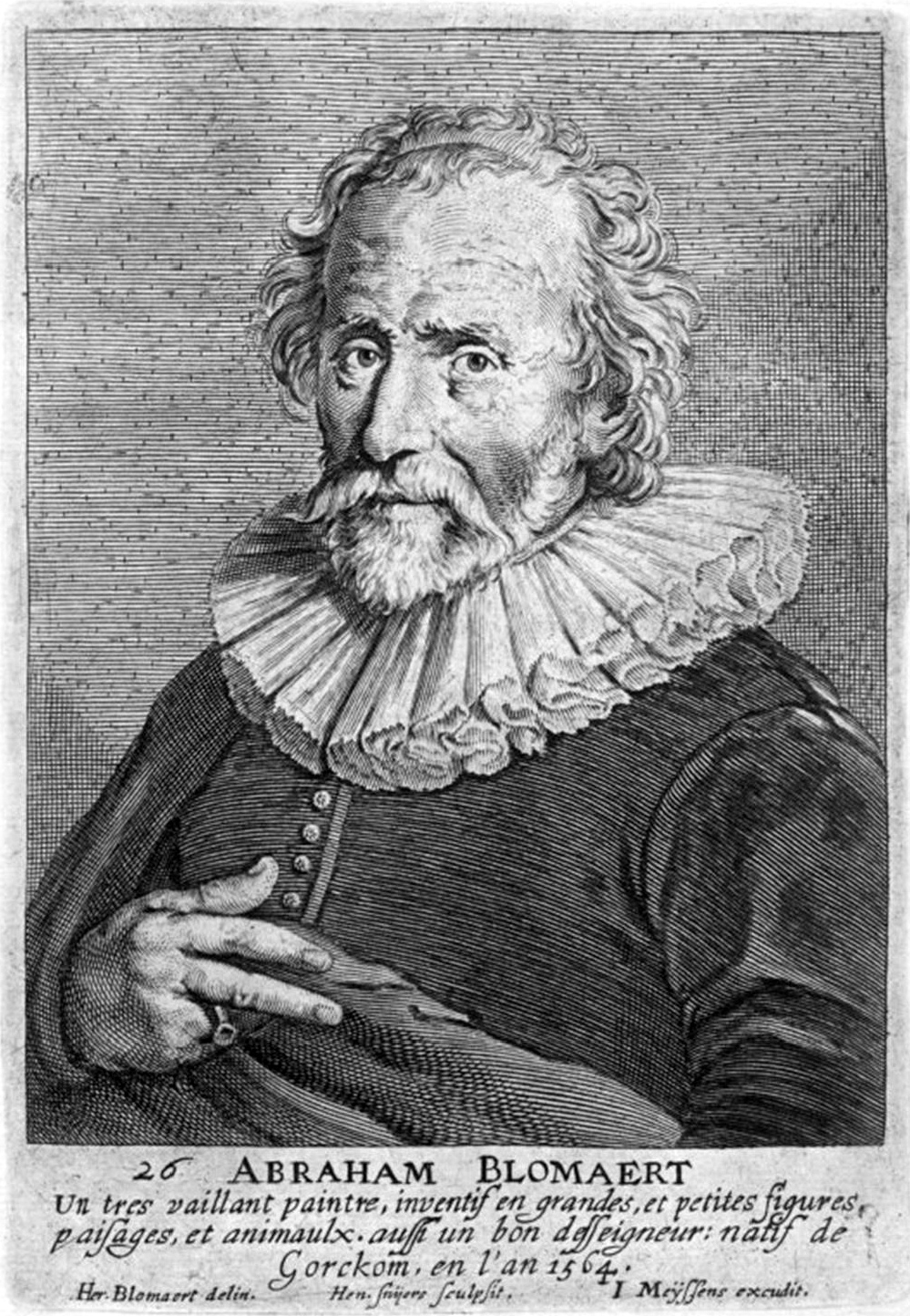
Abraham Bloemaert, page 45

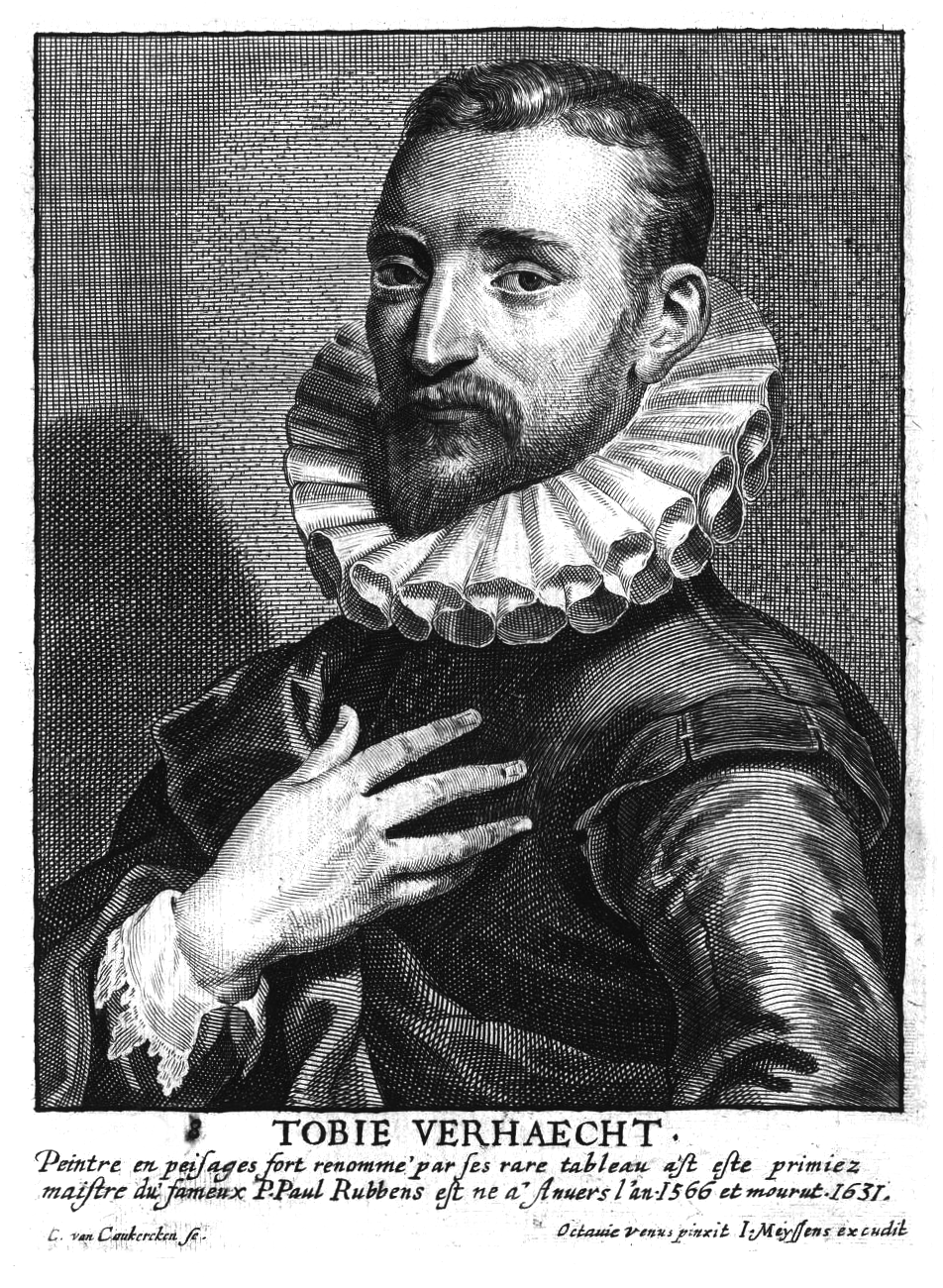
Tobias Verhaecht, page 47

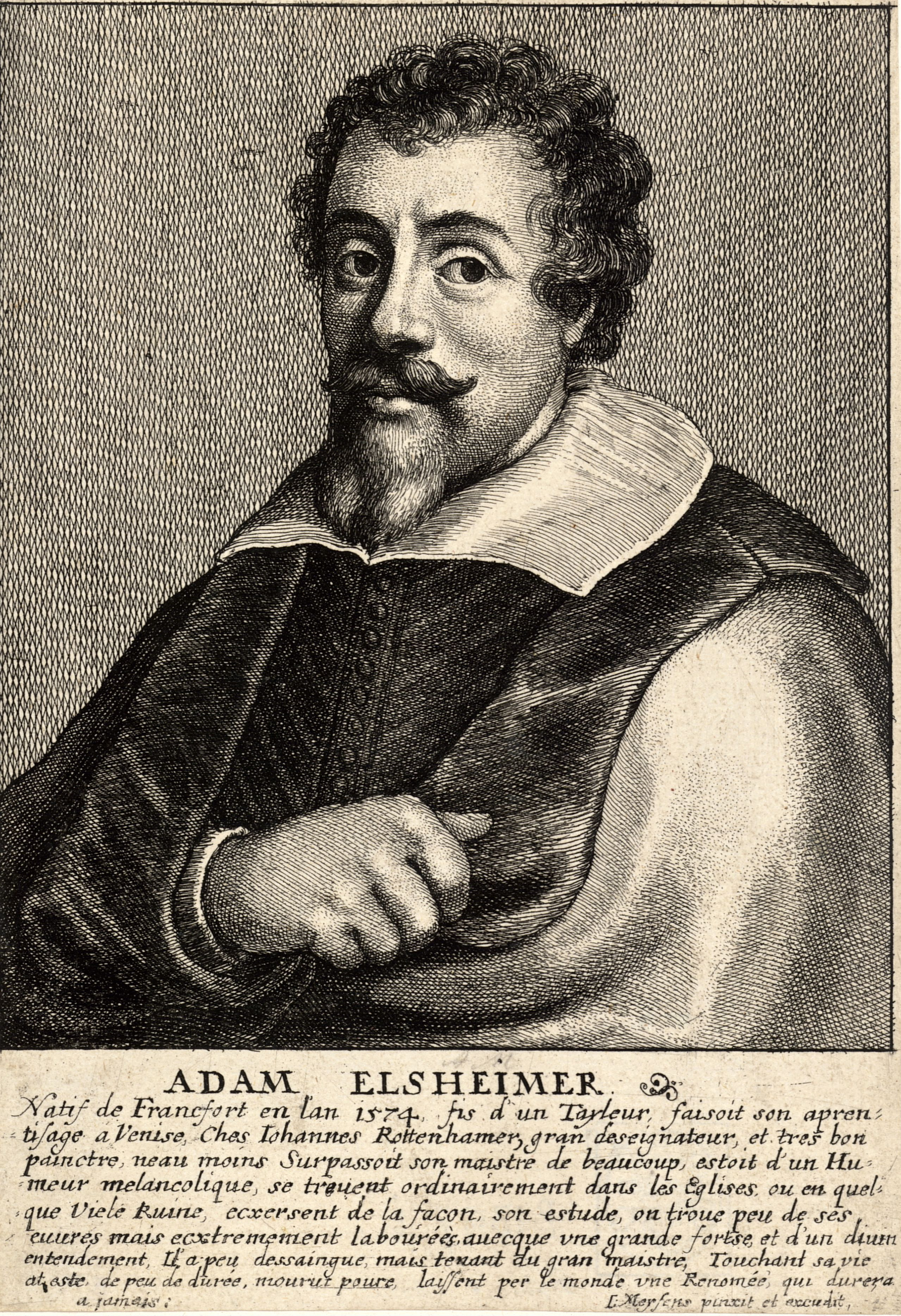
Adam Elsheimer, page 49

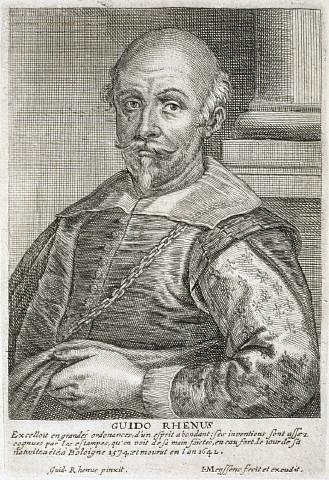
Guido Reni, page 52

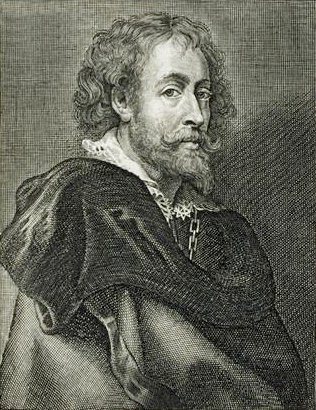
Rubens, page 57

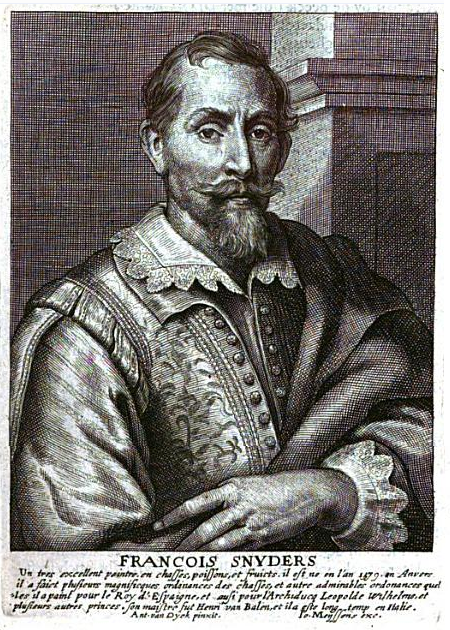
Frans Snyders, page 61

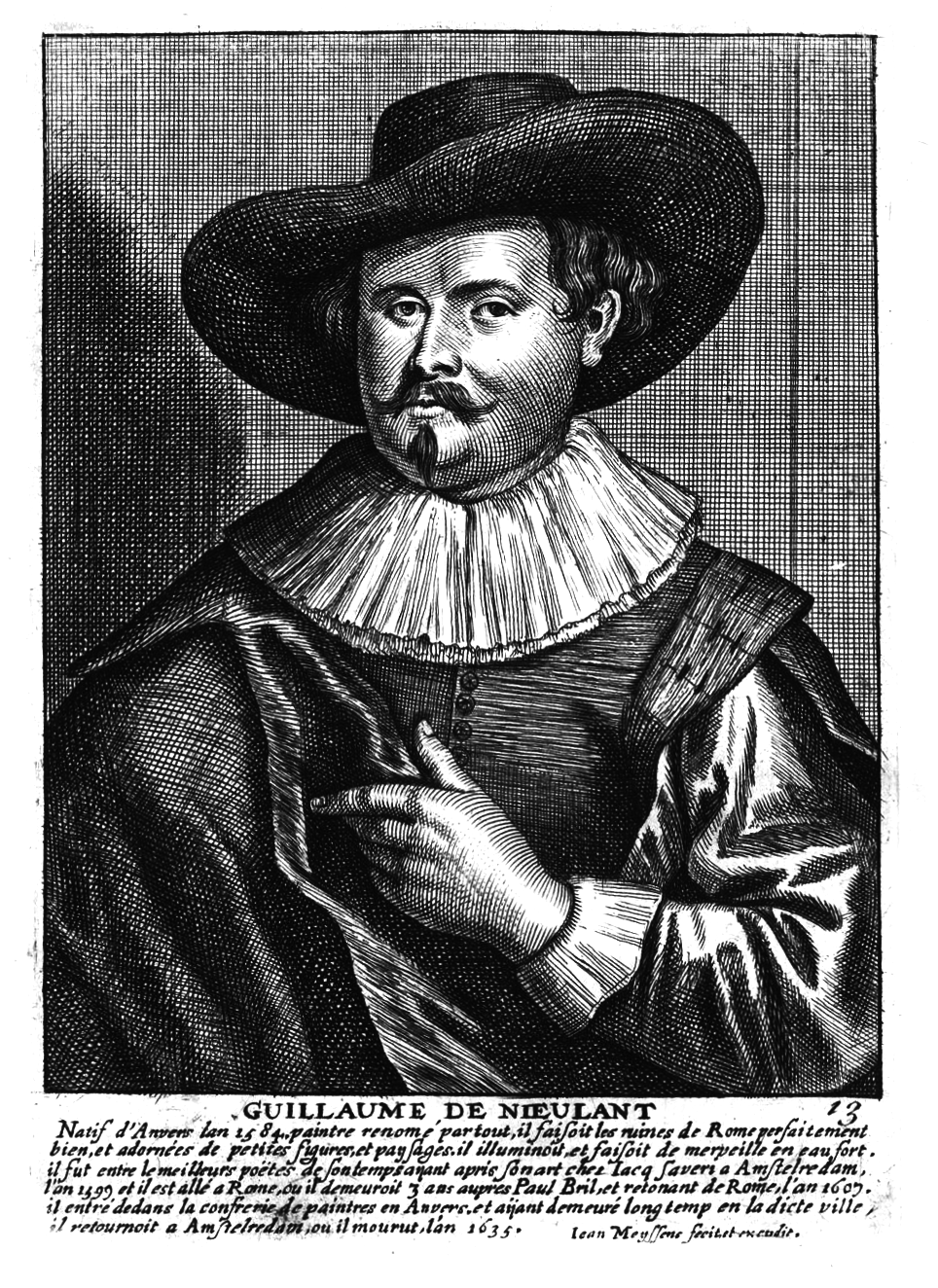
Willem van Nieulandt II, page 63

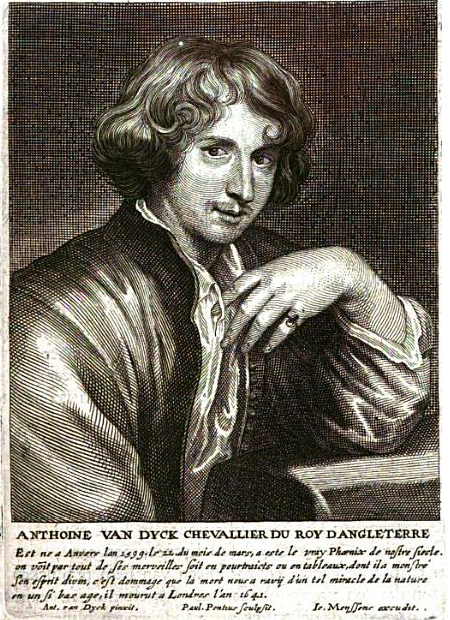
Anthony van Dyck, page 75

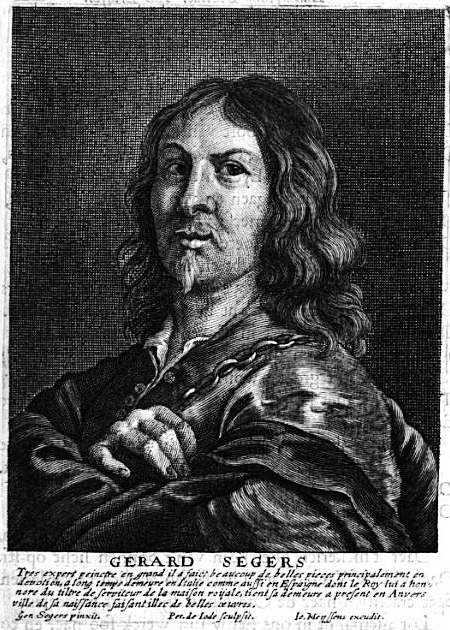
Gerard Segers, page 97

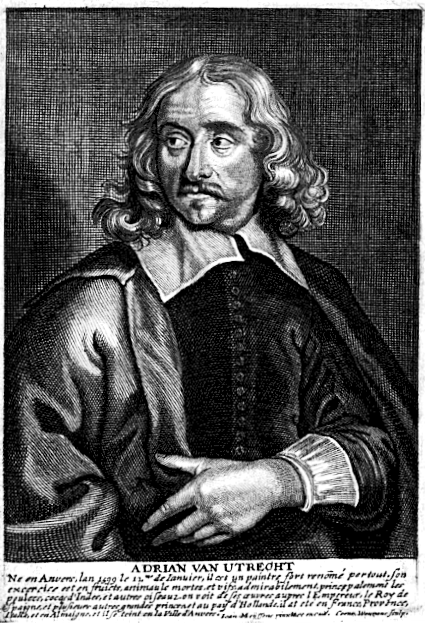
Adriaen van Utrecht, page 107

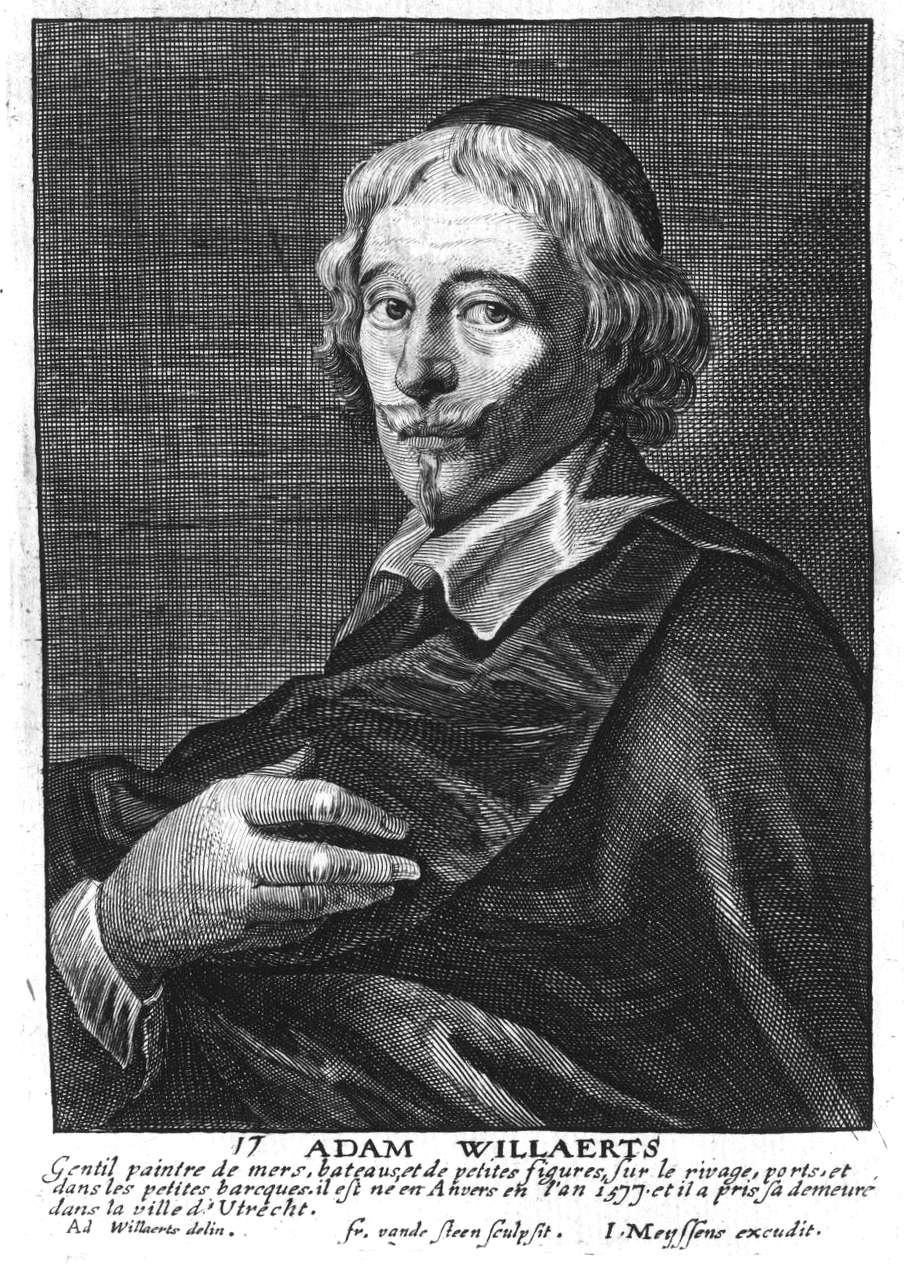
Adam Willaerts, page 111

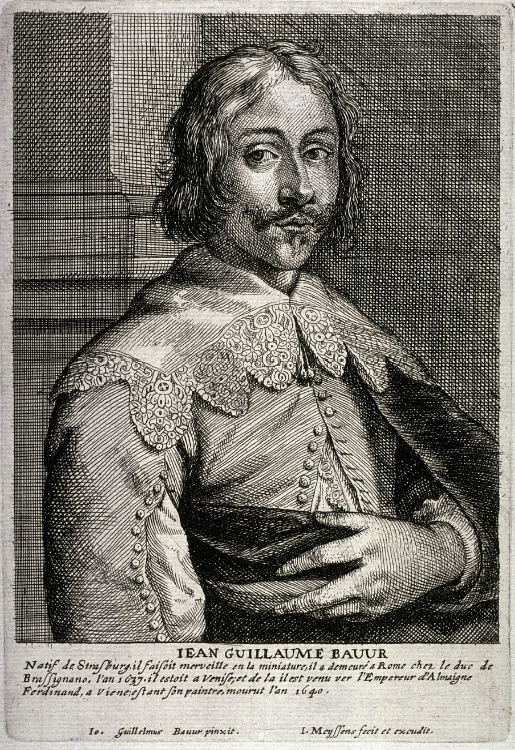
Johann Wilhelm Baur, page 113

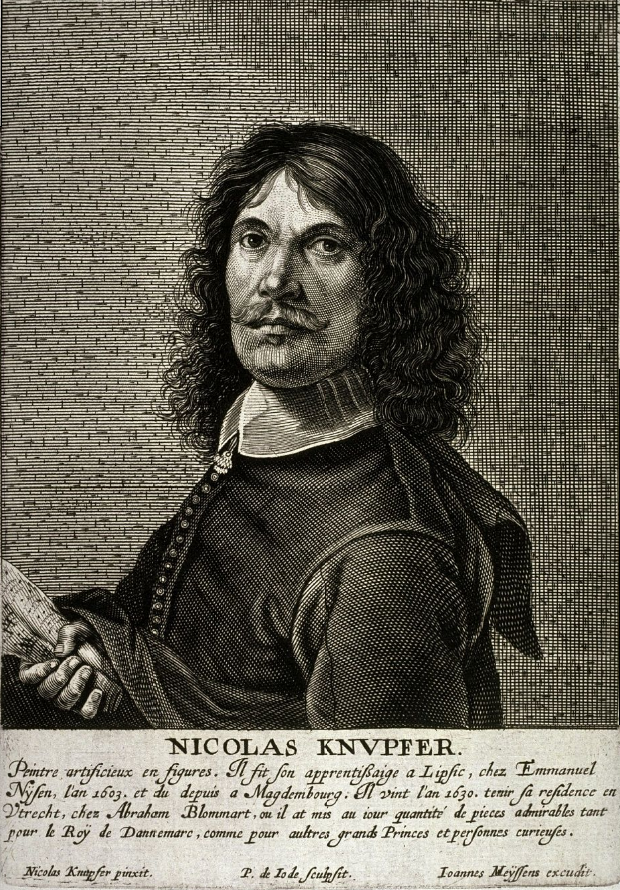
Nicolaes Knupfer, page 115

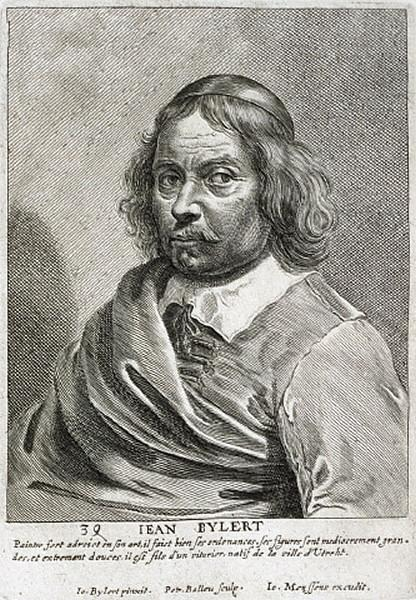
Jan van Bijlert, page 117

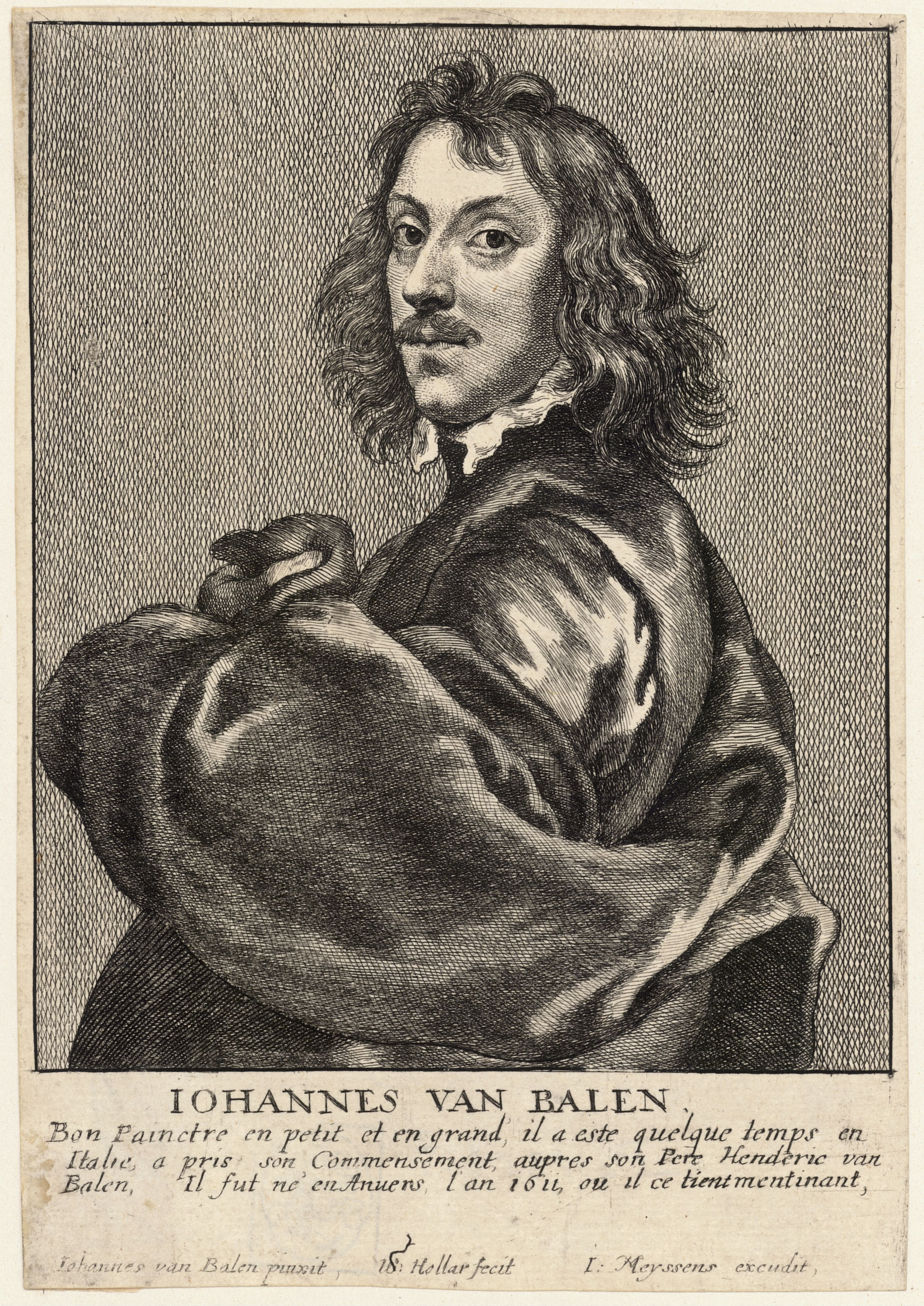
Jan van Balen, page 119

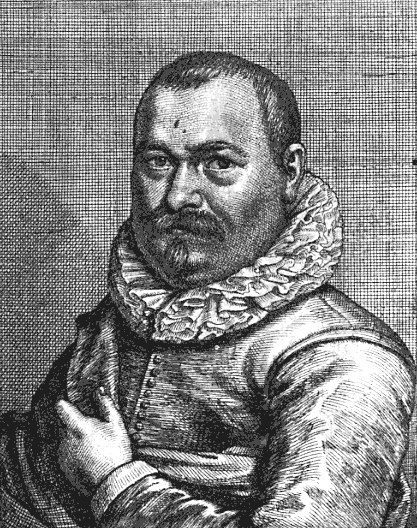
Roelant Savery, page 125

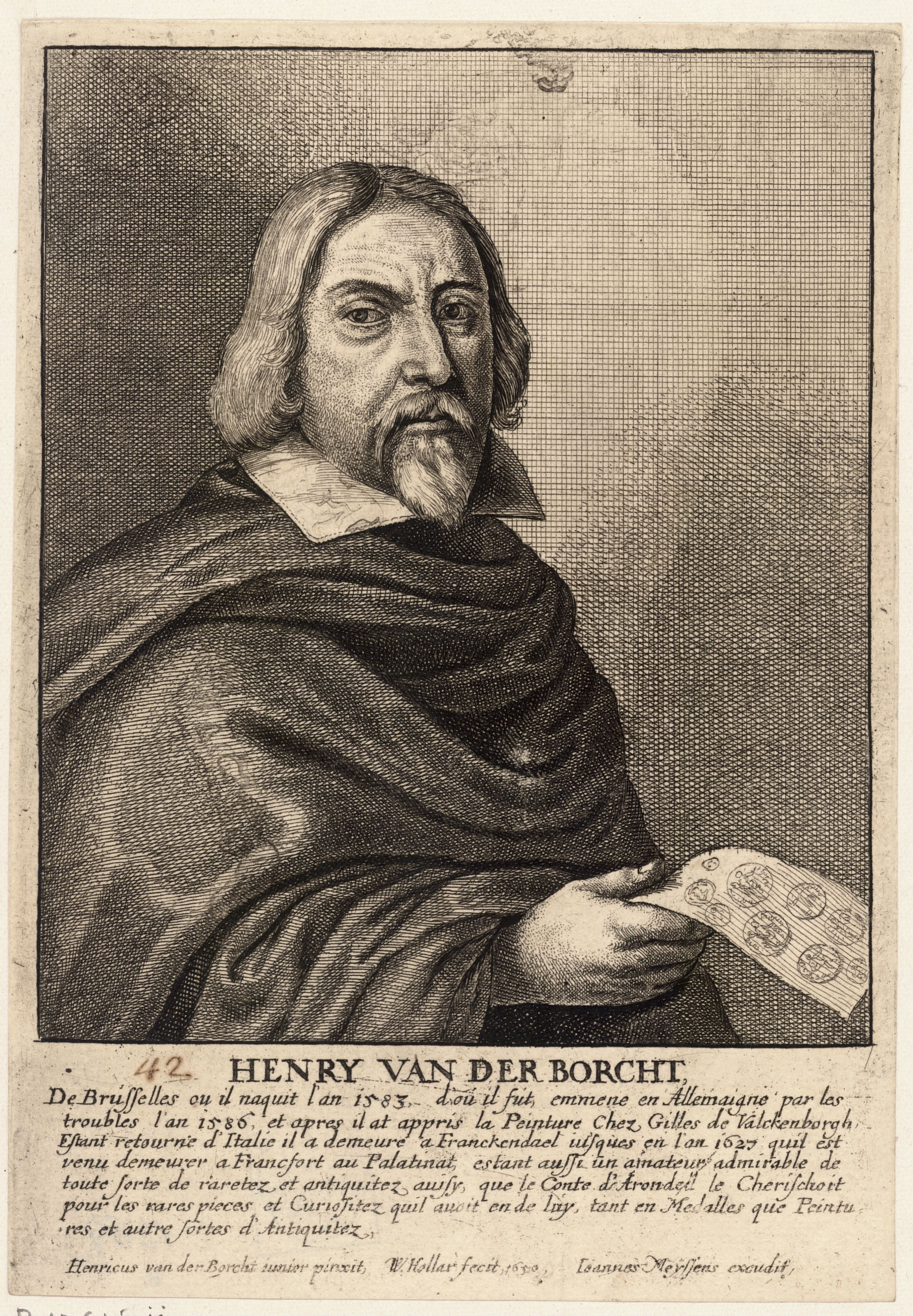
Henry van der Borcht the elder, page 127

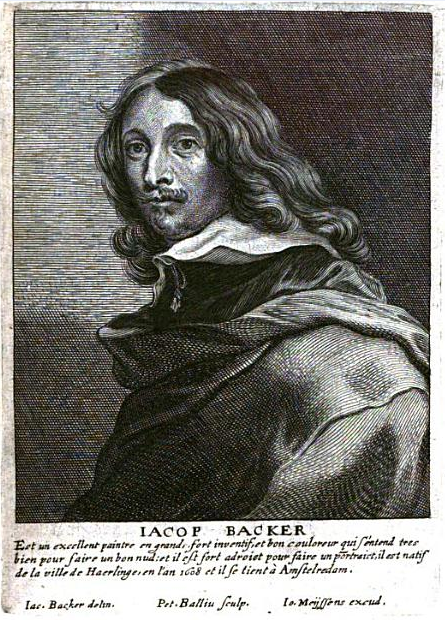
Jacob Adriaensz Backer, page 129

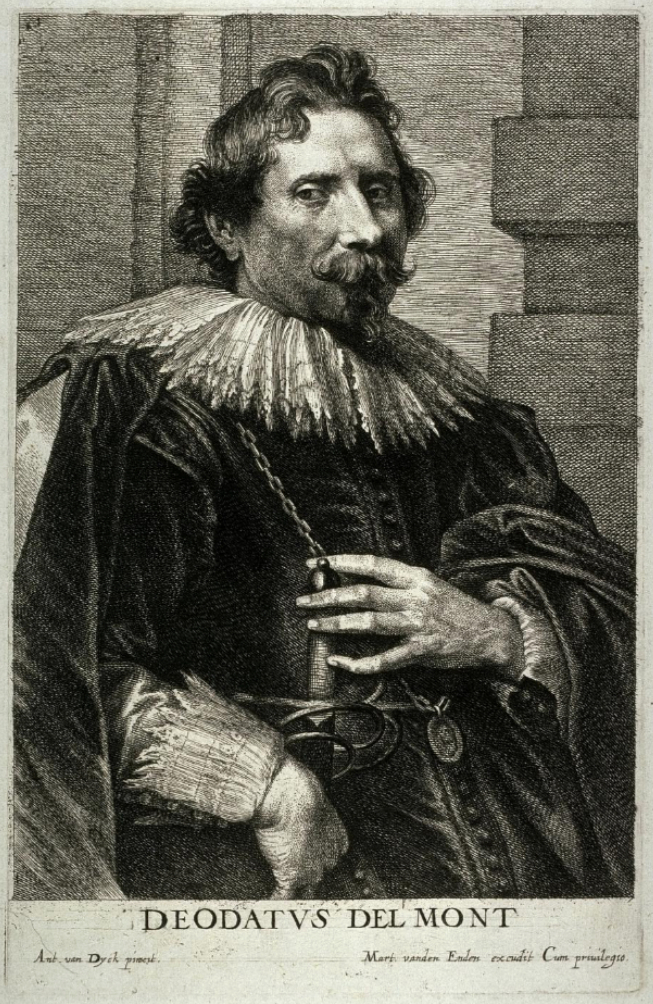
Deodat del Monte, page 133

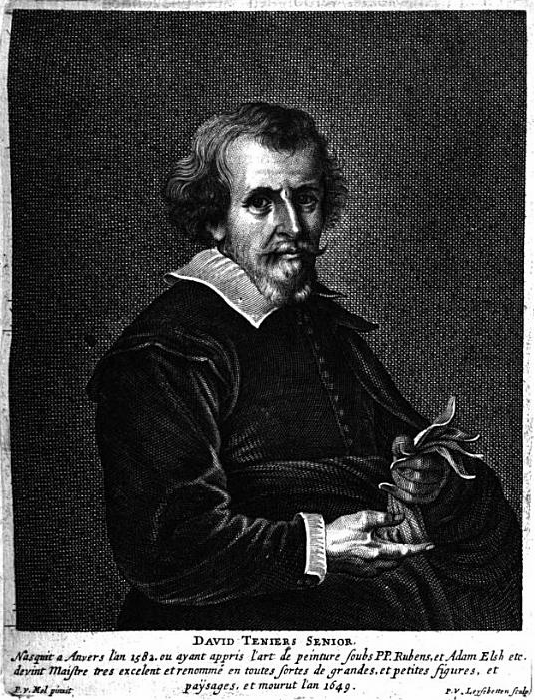
David Teniers I, page 141

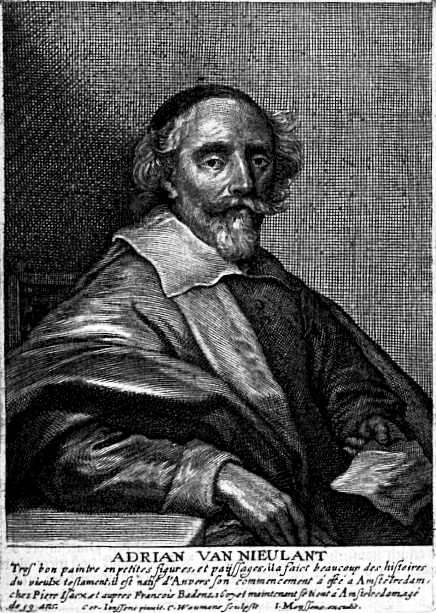
Adriaen van Nieulandt, page 147

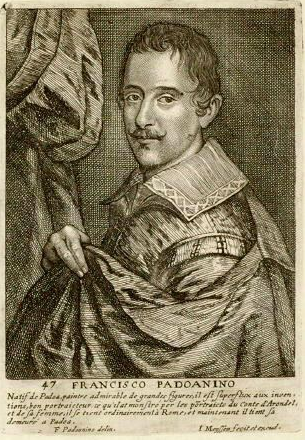
Alessandro Varotari, page 151

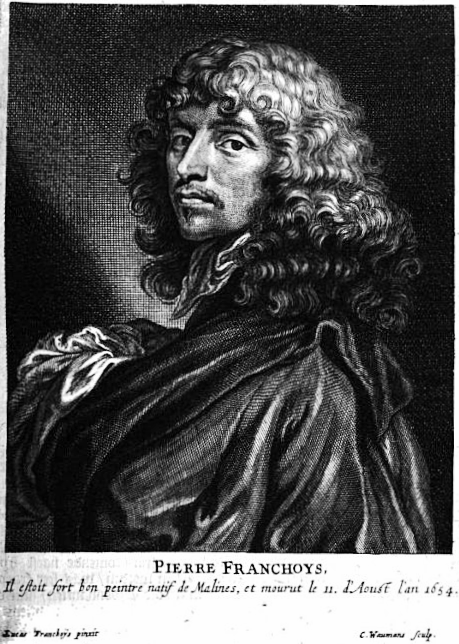
Peter Franchoys, page 153

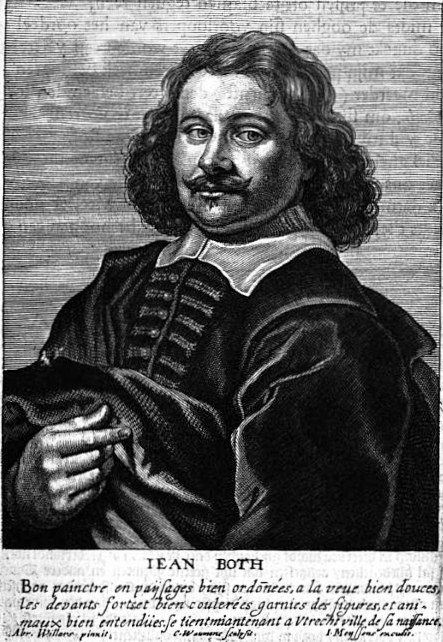
Jan Both, page 157

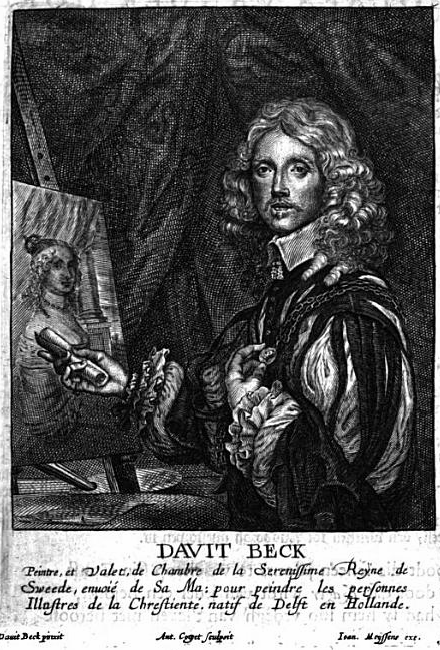
David Beck, page 161

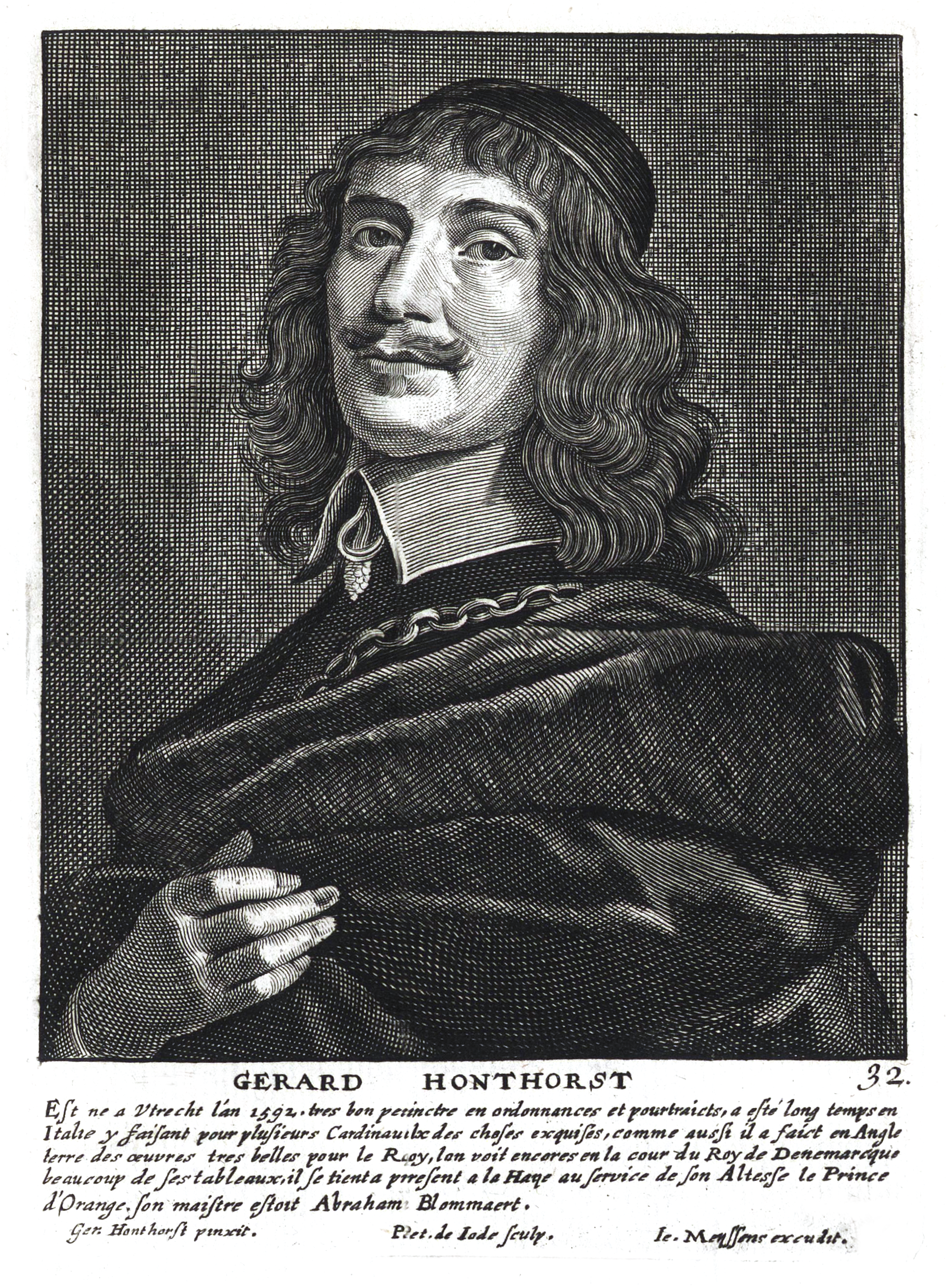
Gerard Honthorst, page 165

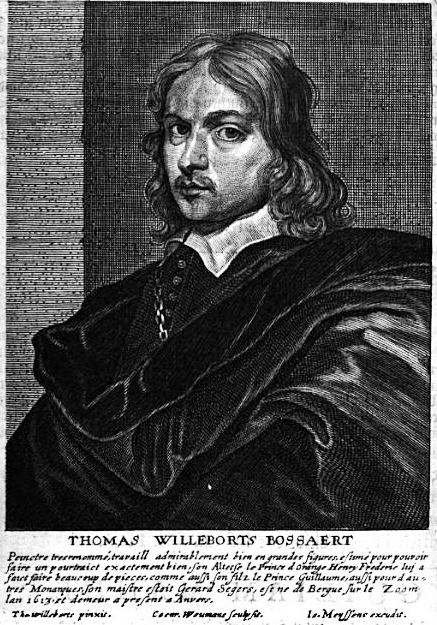
Thomas Willeboirts Bosschaert, page 167

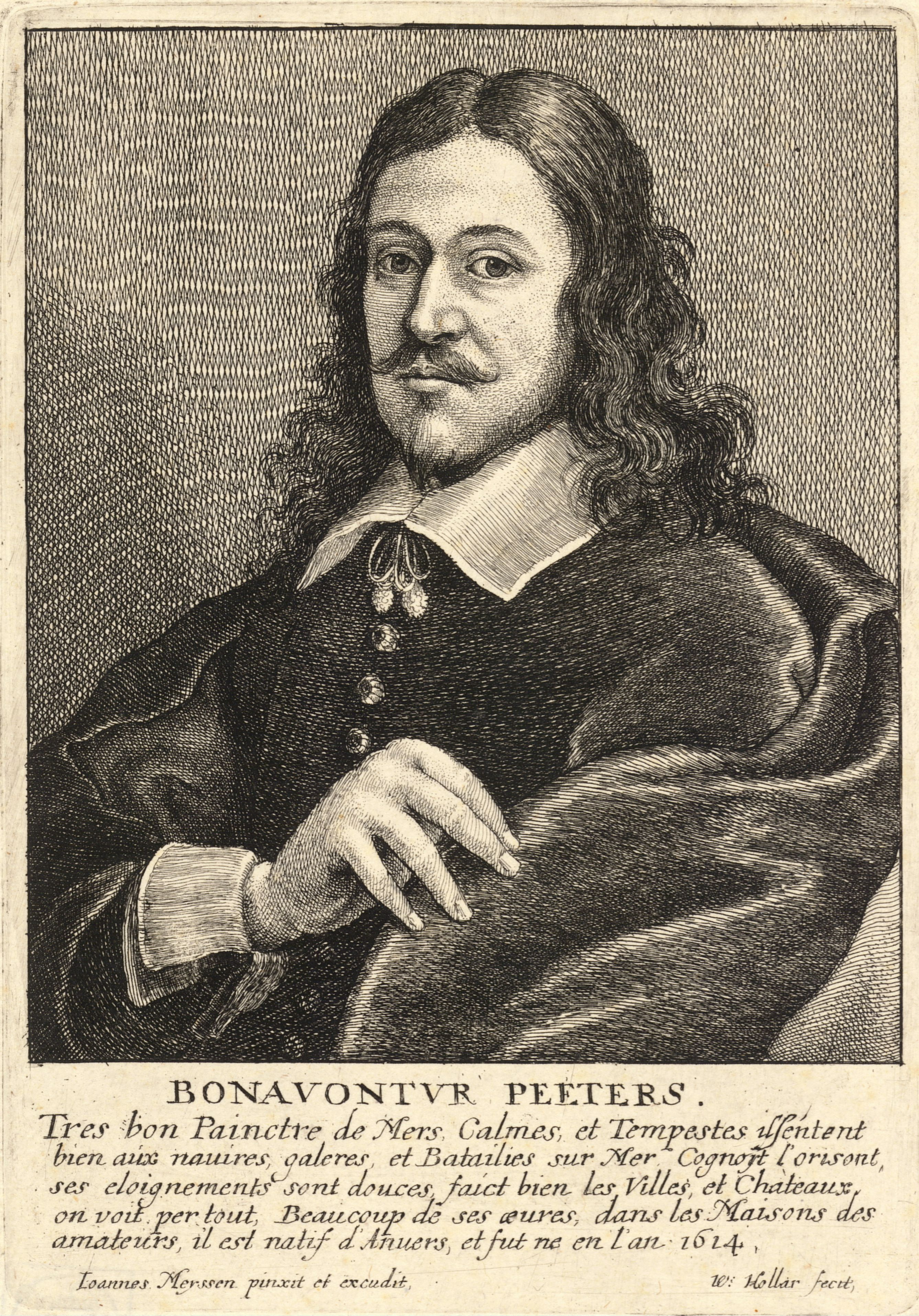
Bonaventura Peeters, page 171

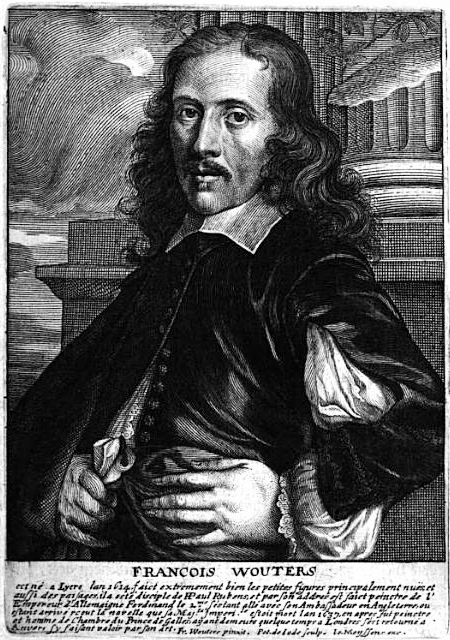
Frans Wouters, page 175

- Adam van Noort p 37
- Otto van Veen p 39
- Abraham Bloemaert p 45
- Tobias Verhaeght p 47
- Adam Elsheimer p 49
- Guido Reni p 52
- Petrus Paulus Rubens p 57
- Frans Snyders p 61
- Guiliam Nieulandt p 63
- Abraham Janssens p 65
- Anthony van Dyck p 75
- Gillis Mostaert p 79
- Pieter Brueghel p 89
- Adriaen Brouwer p 91
- Gerard Seghers p 97
- Lodewijk de Vadder p 98
- Wenceslas Cobergher p 101
- Jan Antonisz. van Ravesteyn p 102
- Palamedes Palamedesz. (I) p 102
- Michiel van Mierevelt p 103
- Cornelis Schut p 103
- Jan Snellinck p 104
- Cornelis de Vos p 104
- Orazio Gentileschi p 105
- Andries van Eertvelt p 105
- Adriaen van Utrecht p 106
- Willem Backereel p 108
- Gilles Backereel p 108
- Jan de Wael I p 108
- Joos van Craesbeeck p 109
- Abraham Matthys p 110
- Adam Willaerts p 111
- Jean Guiliam Bouwer p 113
- Nikolaus Knüpfer p 115
- Jan van Bijlert p 117
- Jan van Balen p 119
- Roelant Savery p 125
- Johannes Parcelis p 126
- Jan Wildens p 126
- Hendrik vander Borght the elder p 127
- Jacob Adriaensz Backer p 129
- Paulus Moreelse p 131
- Hendrick ter Brugghen p 132
- Deodat del Monte p 133
- Peter vande Plas p 139
- Jacques Blanchard p 139
- David Teniers the Elder p 140
- David de Haen p 142
- Vincent Malo p 143
- Franciscus Perreer p 143
- Jan van Hoeck p 143
- Augustijn Brun p 145
- Hans Holsman p 145
- Frederick Brentel p 145
- Jacob van der Heyden p 145
- Hesselien (Crabbeken van Amsterdam) p 145
- Peeter Meulenaer p 145
- Raphael Coxie (son of Michiel) p 145
- Spanjolet p 145
- Gillis Peeters p 145
- Adriaen van Nieulandt the younger p 146
- Remigius van Rheni p 149
- Peeter van Loon p 149
- Padovanino p 150
- Lucas Franchois the Younger p 152
- Peter Franchois p 152
- Peter Soutemans p 154
- Pieter Neefs I p 155
- Dirck van Baburen p 155
- Jan Both p 156
- Pietro Testa p 158
- Christoffel Jacob vander Laenen p 159
- David Beck p 160
- Nicolaes vander Horst p 162
- Johann Matthias Kager p 162
- Theodor Rombouts p 163
- Henrick de Clerck p 163
- Anthoni Salart p 163
- Gerrit van Honthorst p 164
- Thomas Willeborts Bossaert p 166
- Daniel van Alsloot p 168
- Jacques Focquier p 168
- Guiliam Mahue p 168
- Pieter van Laer p 169
- Bonaventura Peeters p 171
- Franciscus Wouters p 174
- Hendrik Andriessens p 176

== Artists in Het Gulden Cabinet, Part II ==
The engraved portraits included as illustrations in Book II are below, followed by the artists listed in order of appearance in the text. Book II begins on page 181.

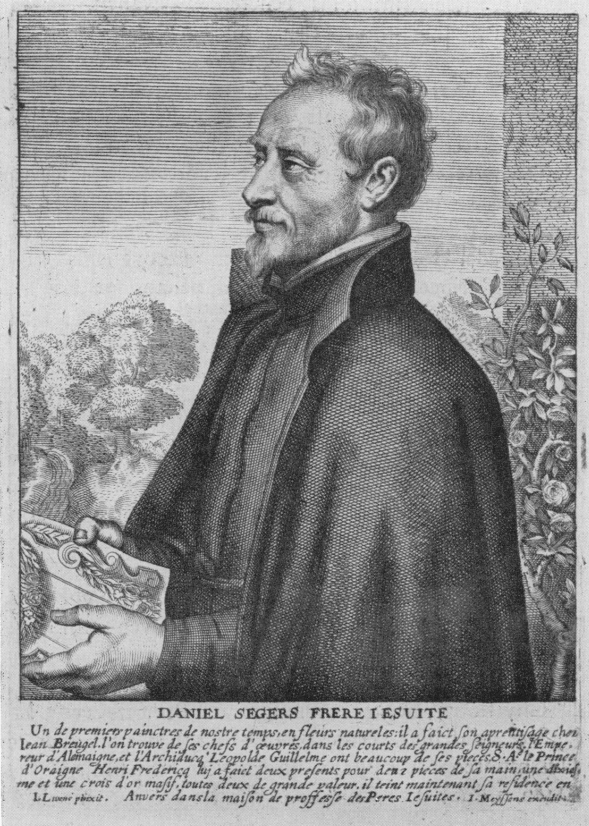
Daniel Seghers, page 213

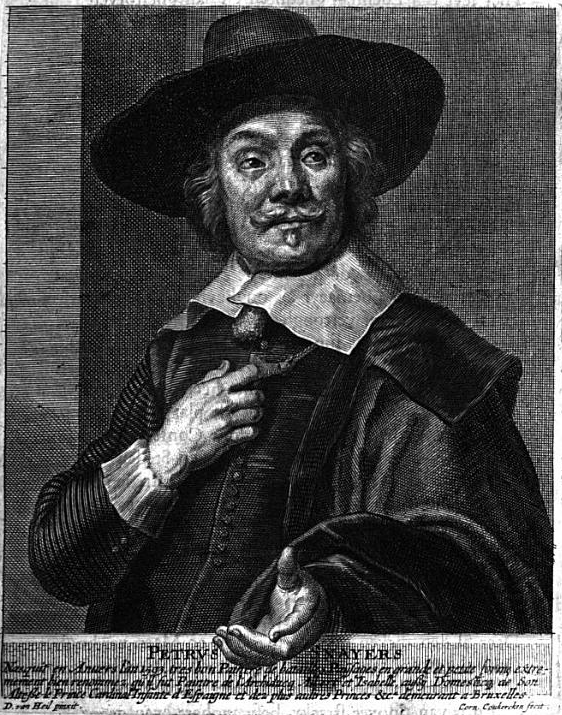
Peter Snayers, page 221

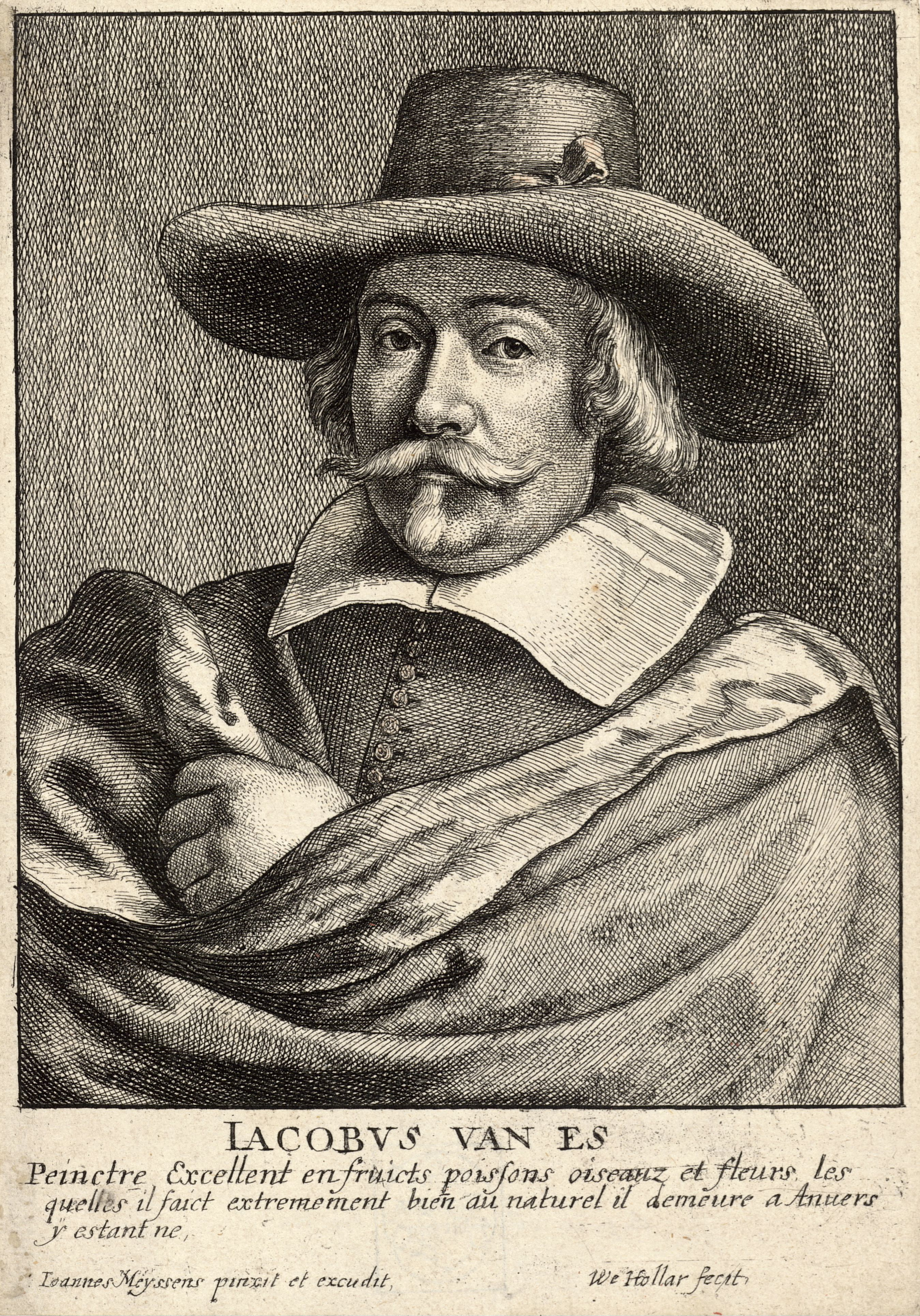
Jacob van Es, page 227

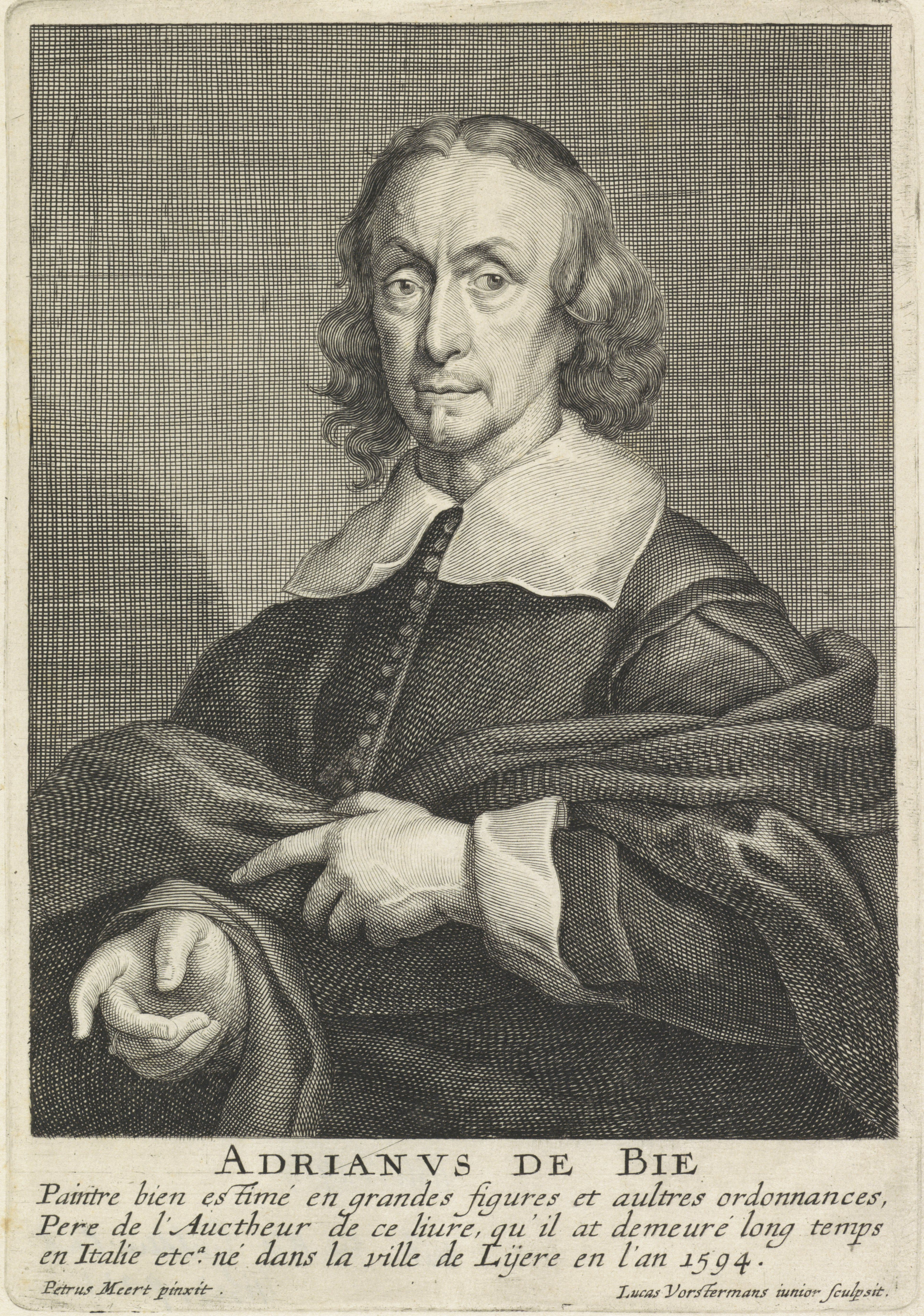
Adrian de Bie, page 231

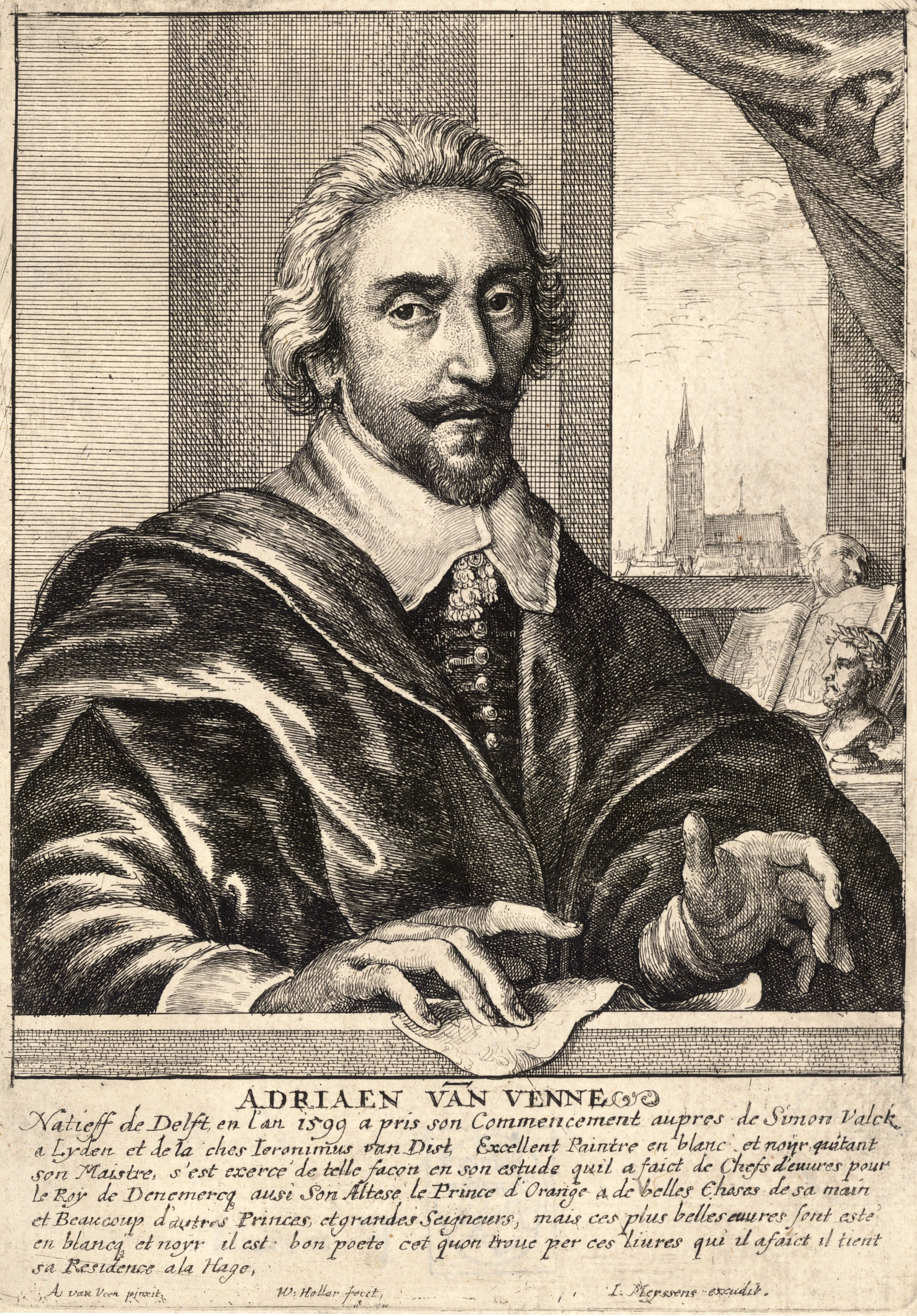
Adriaen van de Venne, page 235

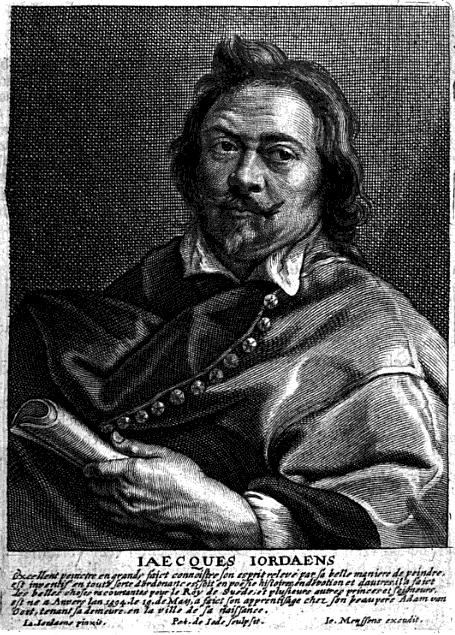
Jacques Jordaens, page 239

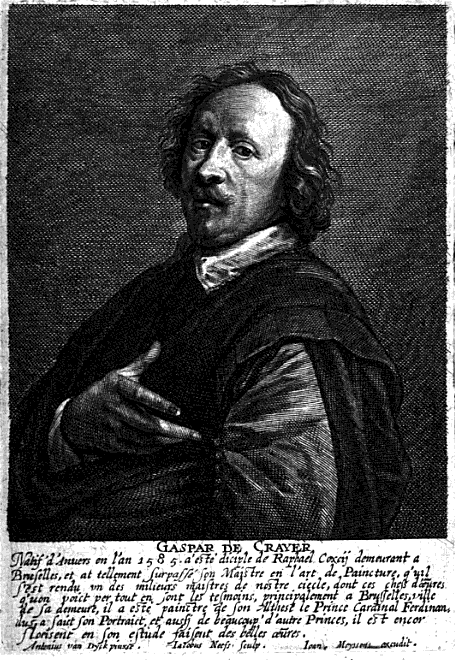
Gaspard de Crayer, page 245

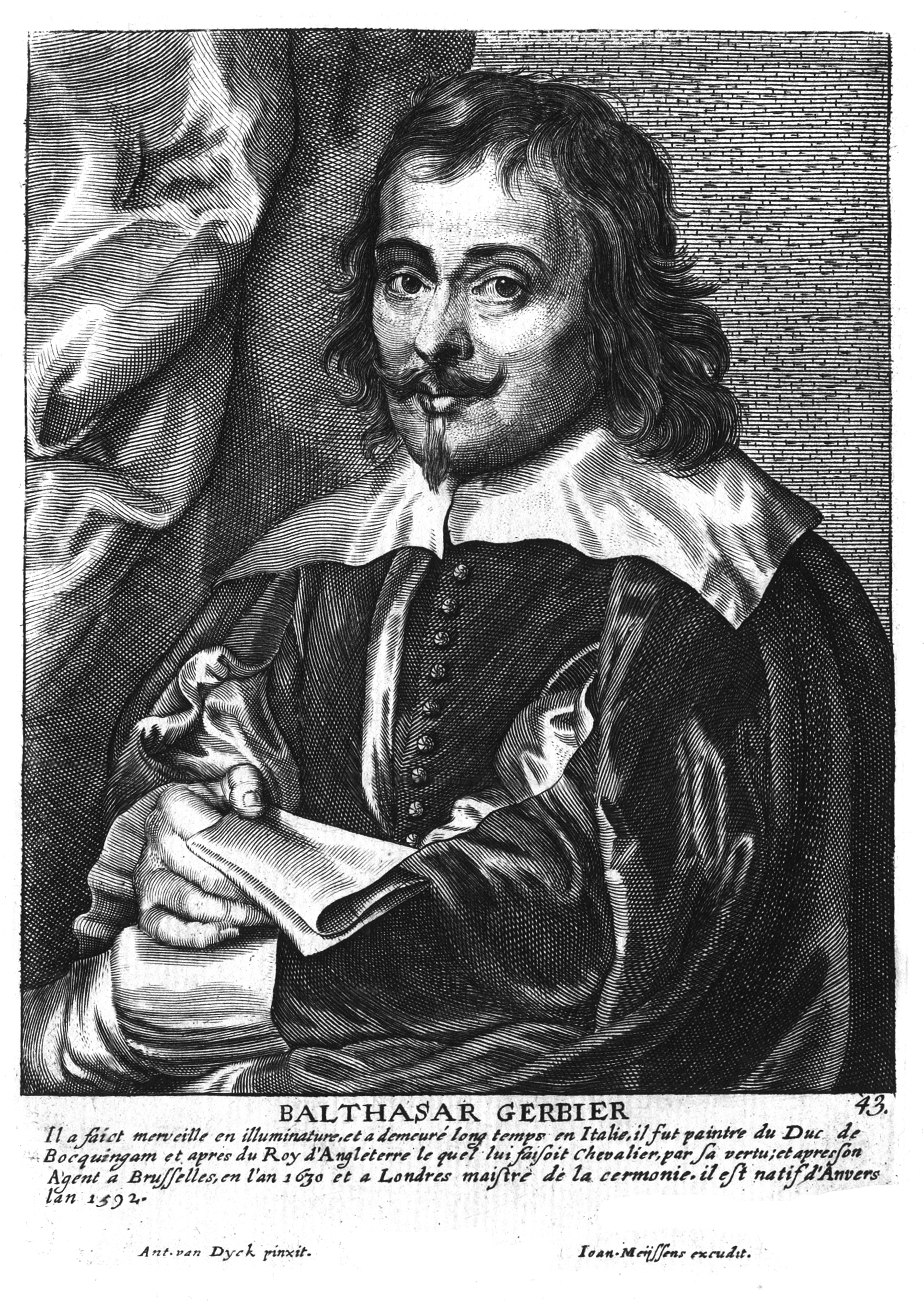
Balthazar Gerbier, page 249

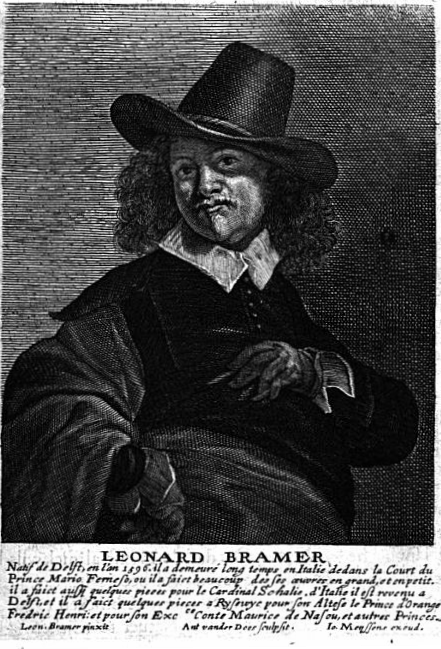
Leonard Bramer, page 253

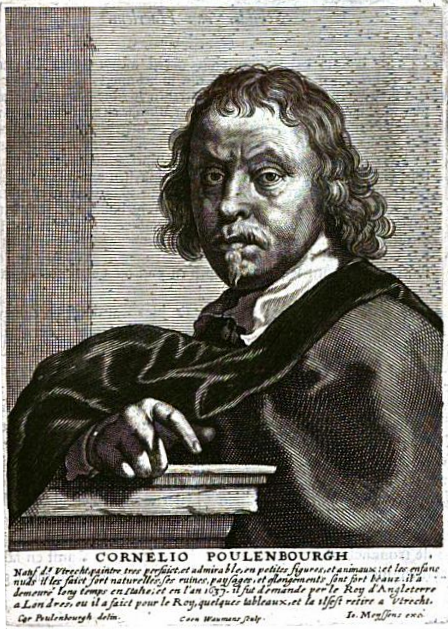
Cornelis van Poelenburch, page 257

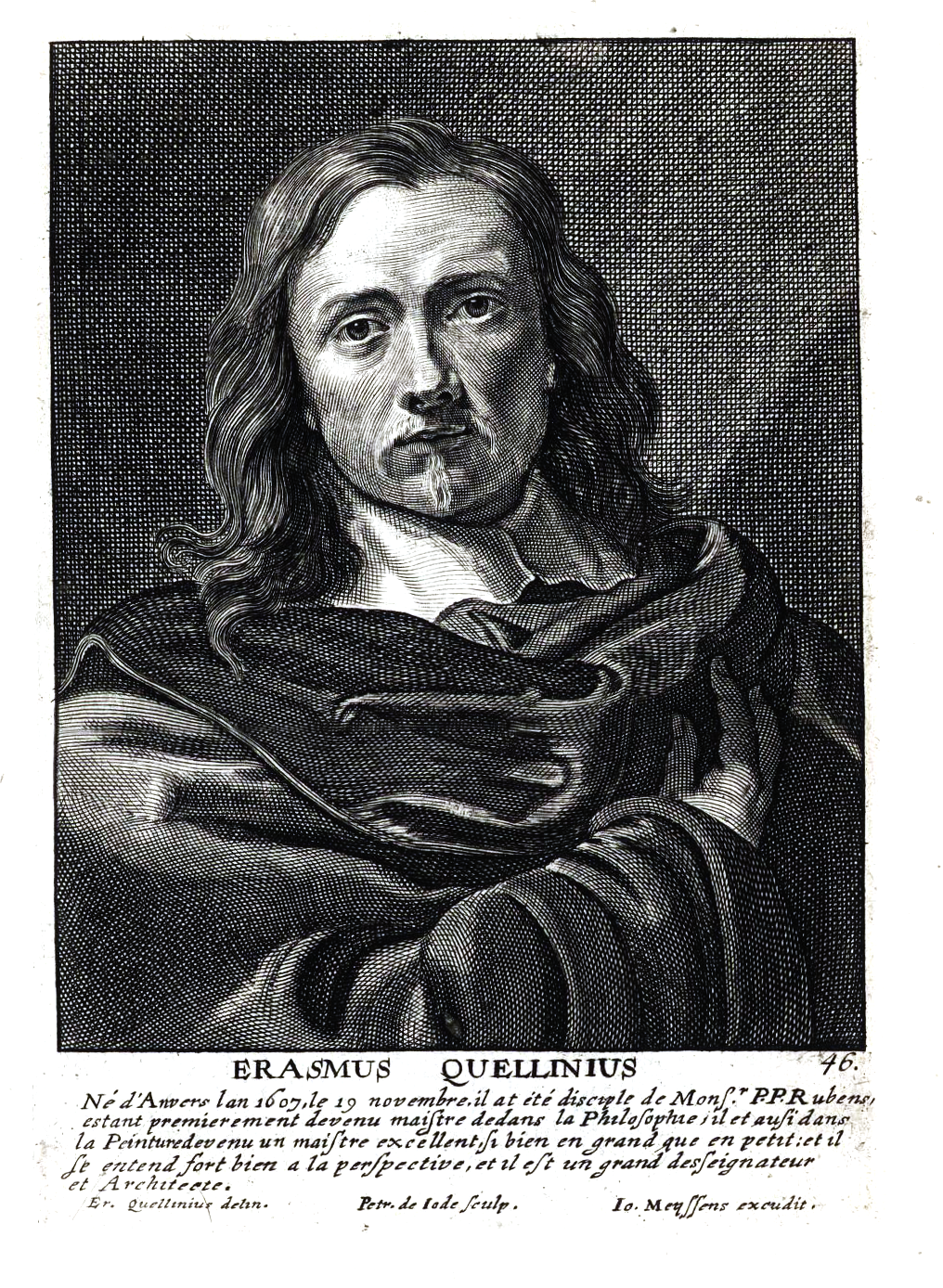
Erasmus Quellinus II, page 261

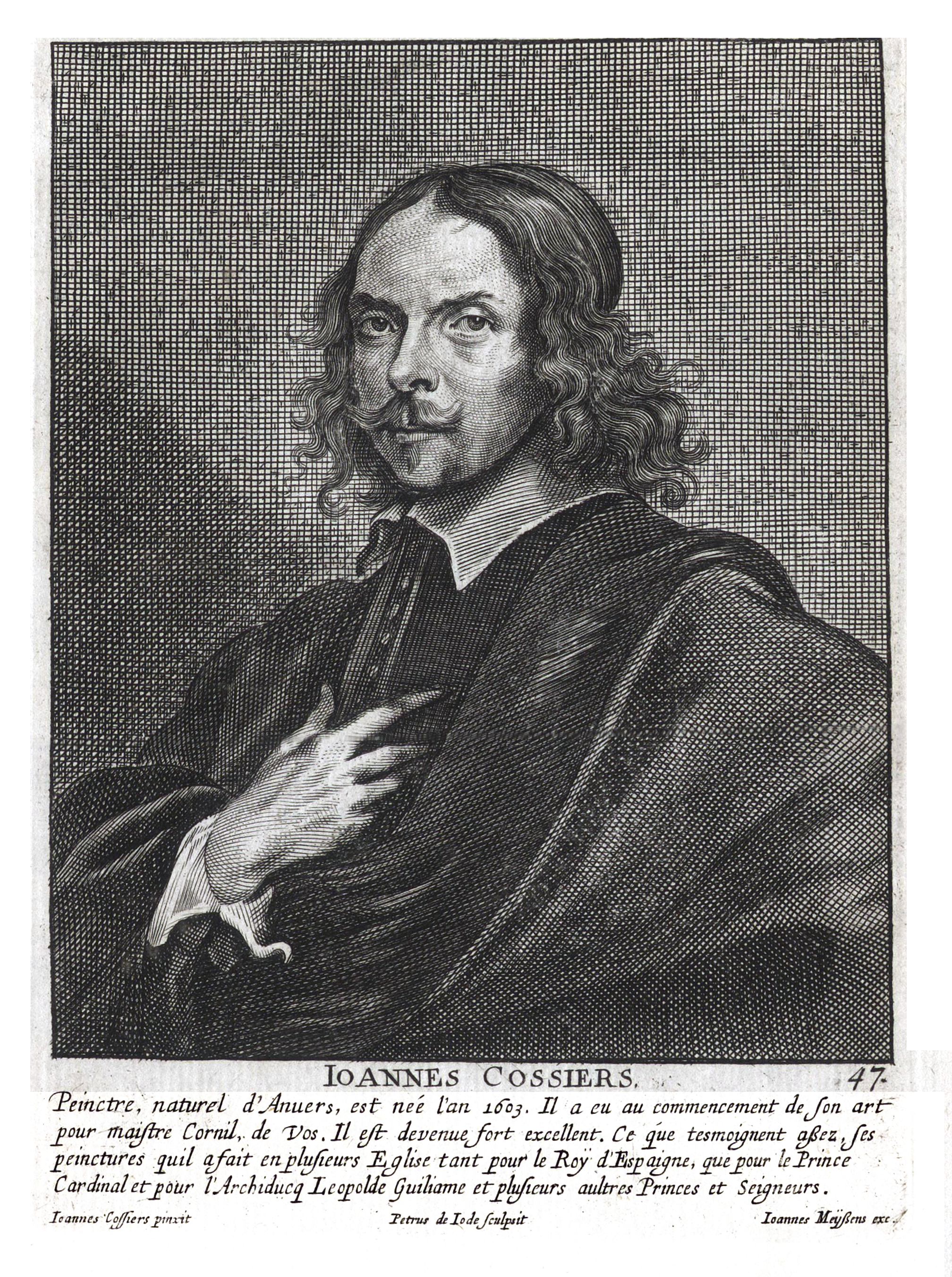
Jan Cossiers, page 267

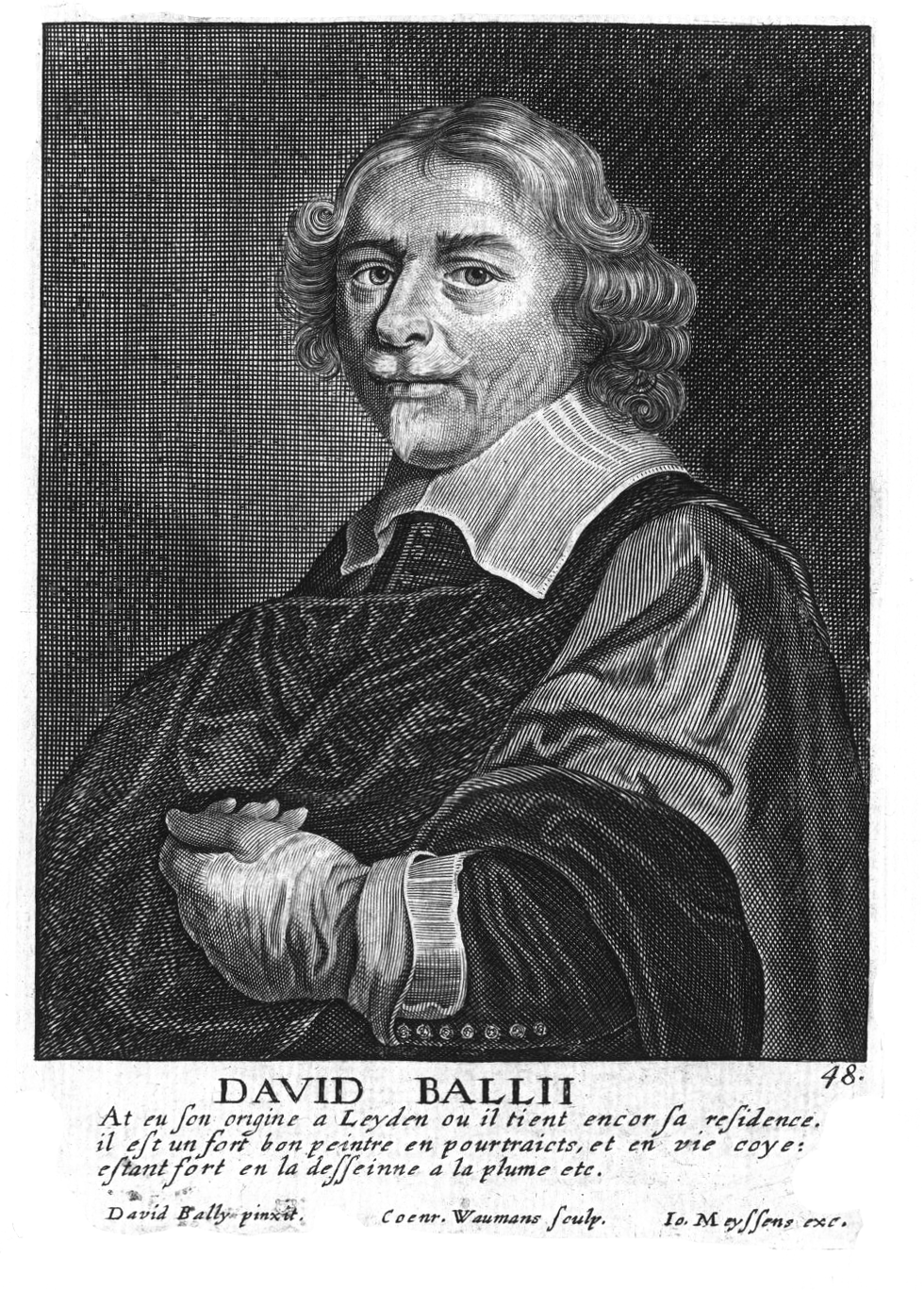
David Bailly, page 271

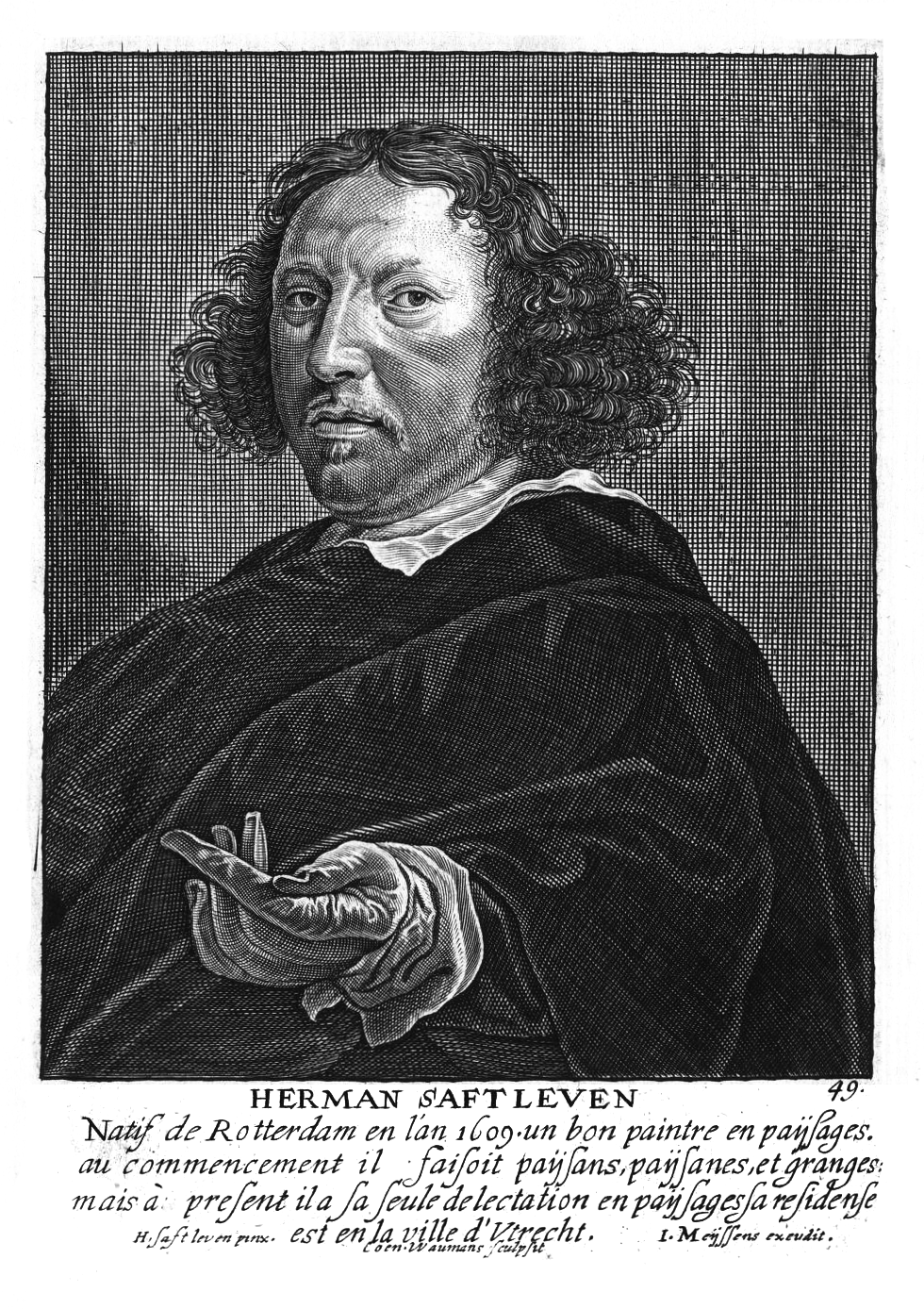
Herman Saftleven, page 275

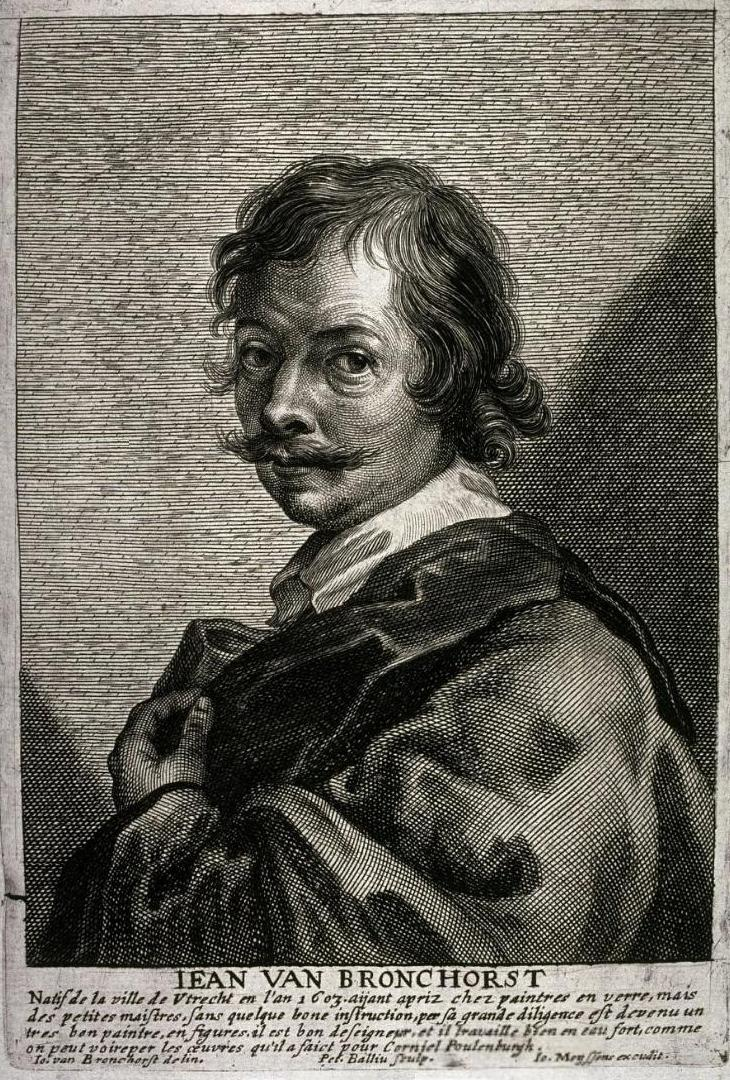
Jan van Bronkhorst, page 279

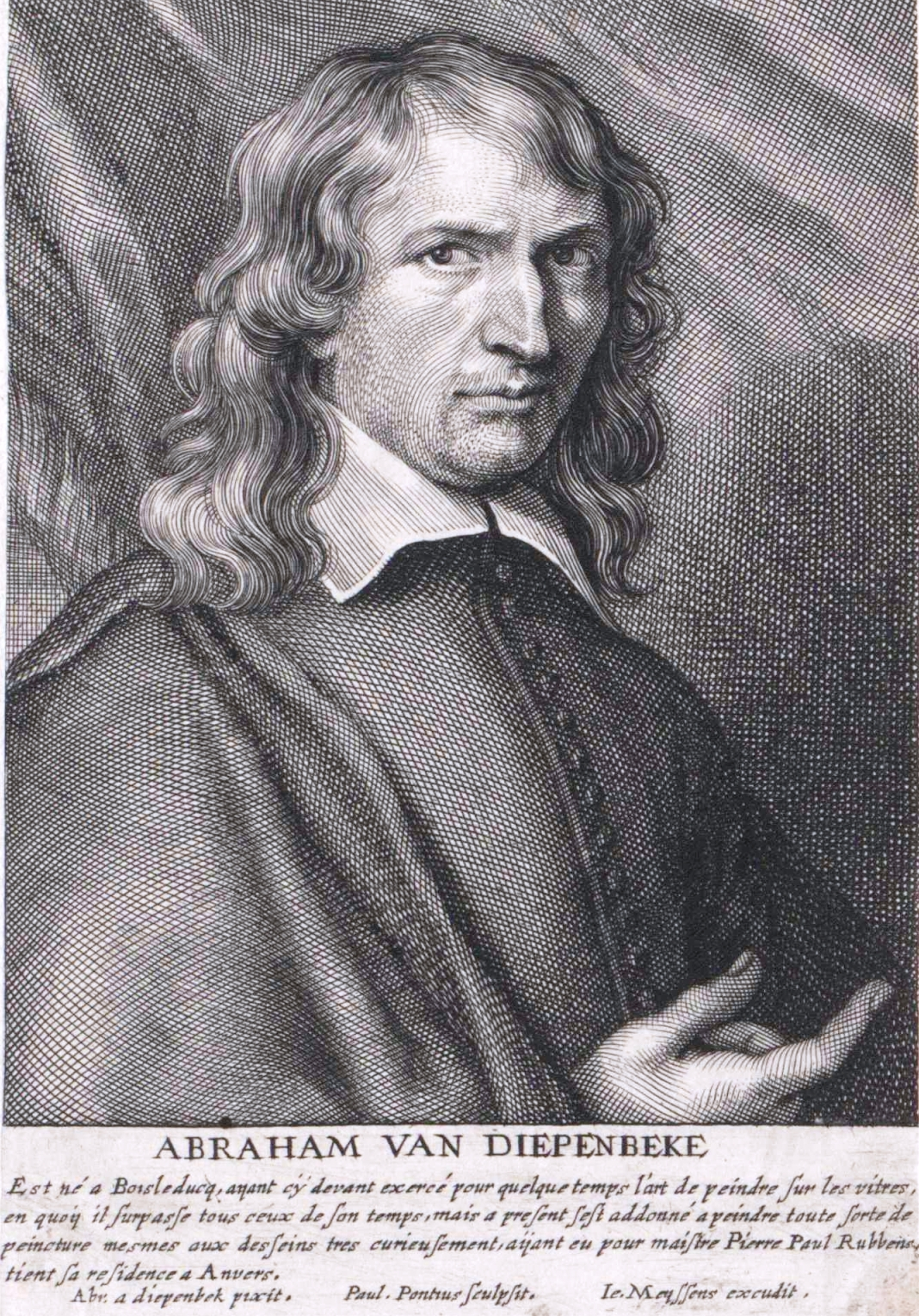
Abraham van Diepenbeeck, page 285

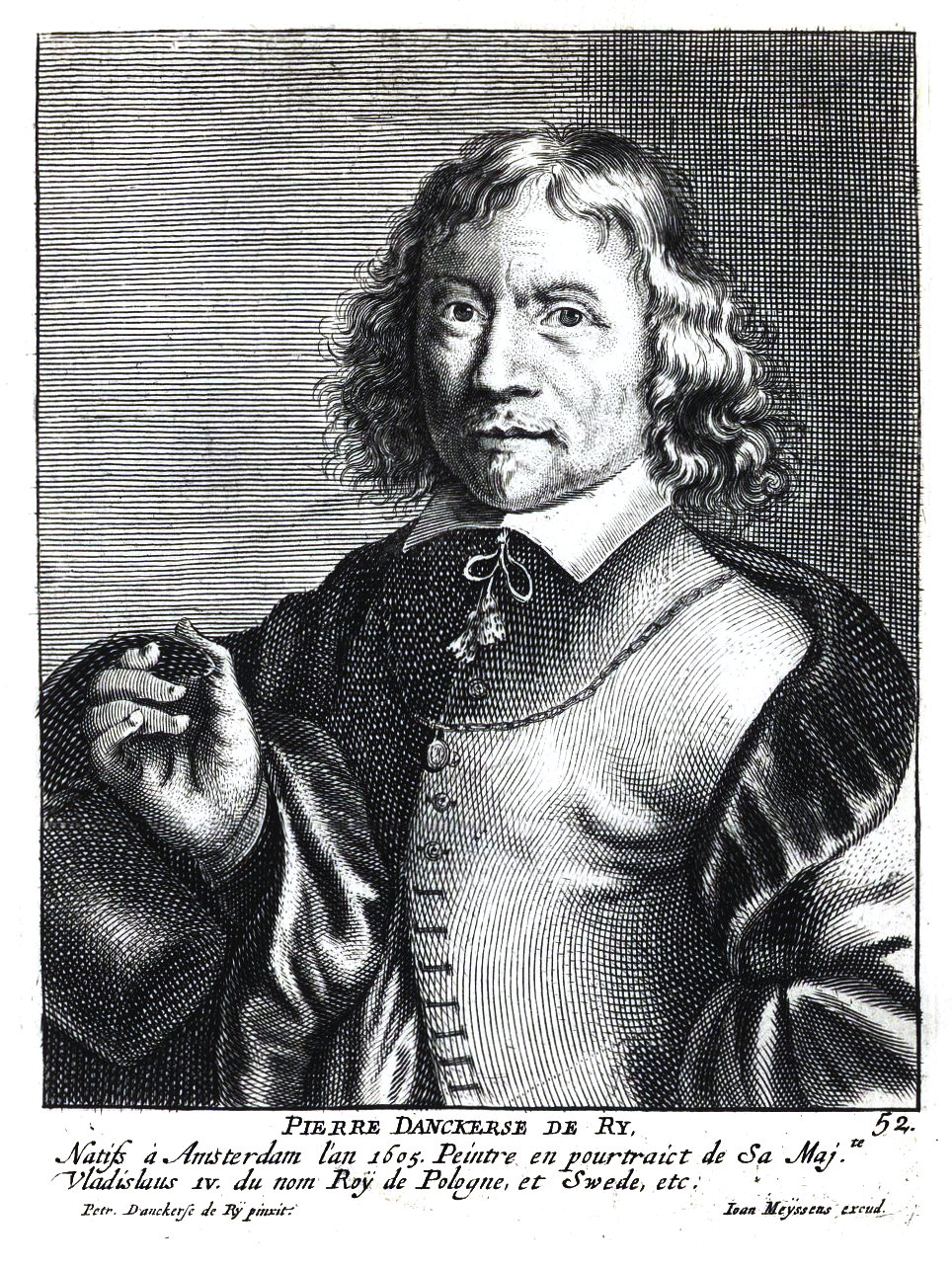
Pieter Danckerts de Ry, page 289

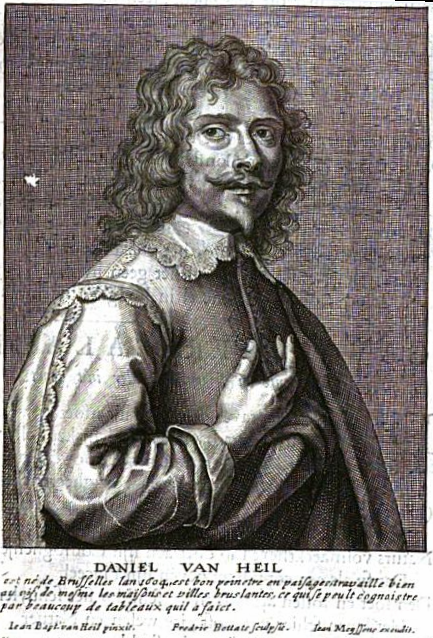
Daniel van Heil, page 293

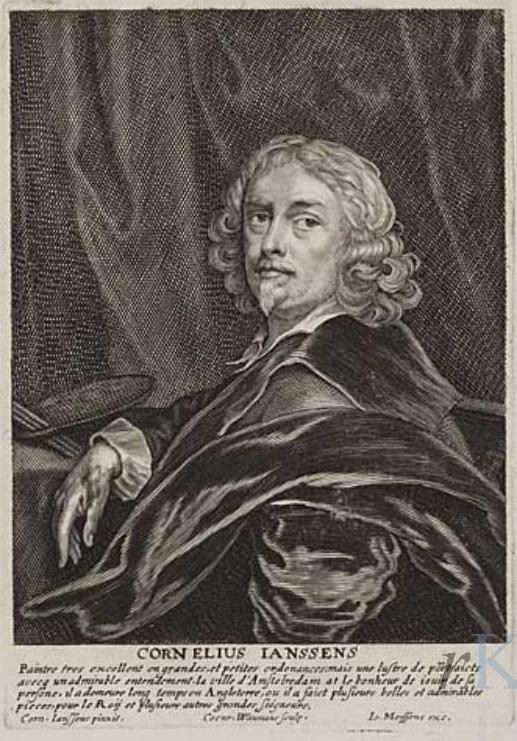
Cornelis Janssens, page 299

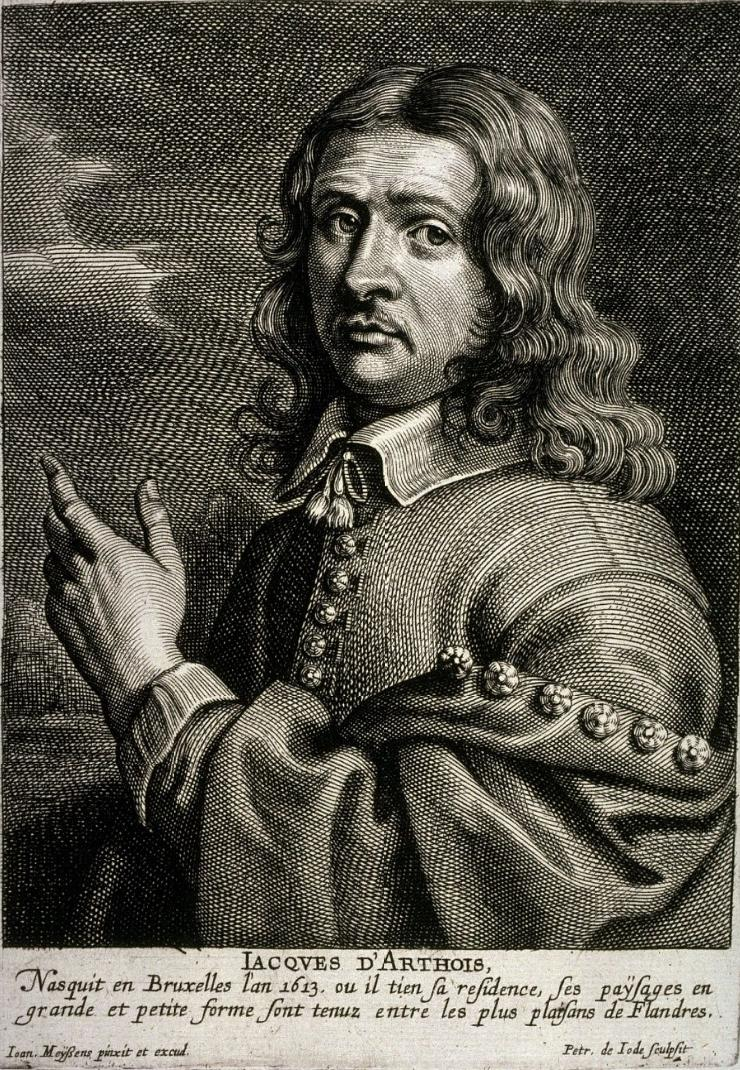
Jacques d'Arthois, page 301

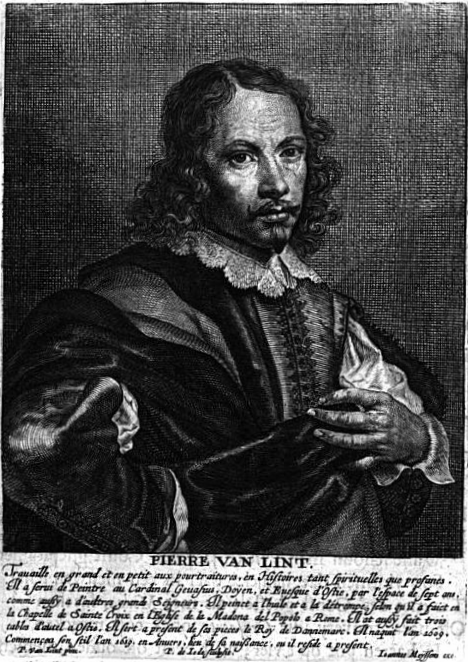
Pieter van Lint, page 307

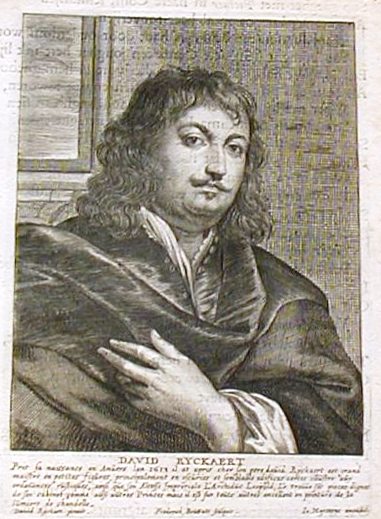
David Ryckaert, page 309

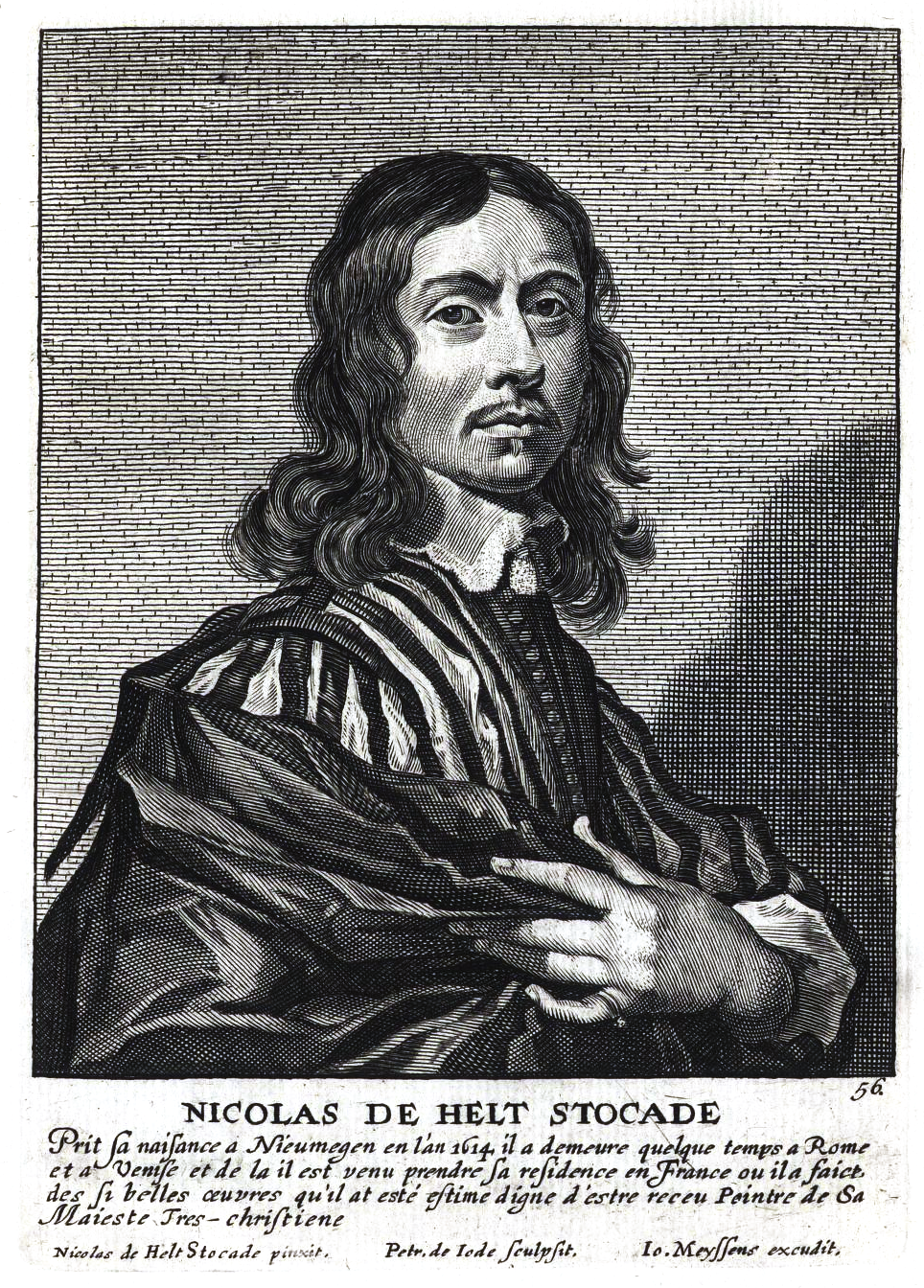
Nicolaes de Helt Stockade, page 313

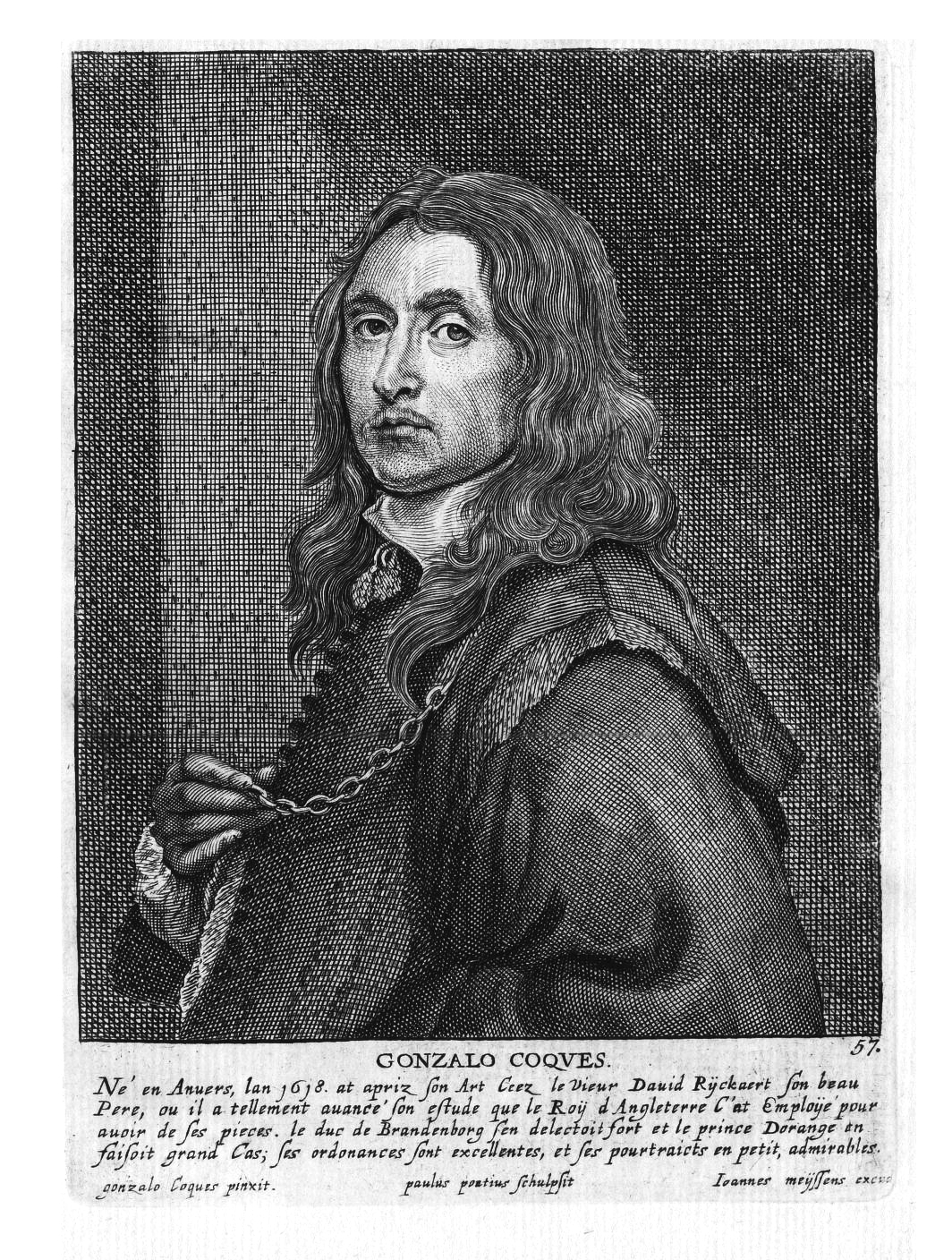
Gonzalo Coques, page 317

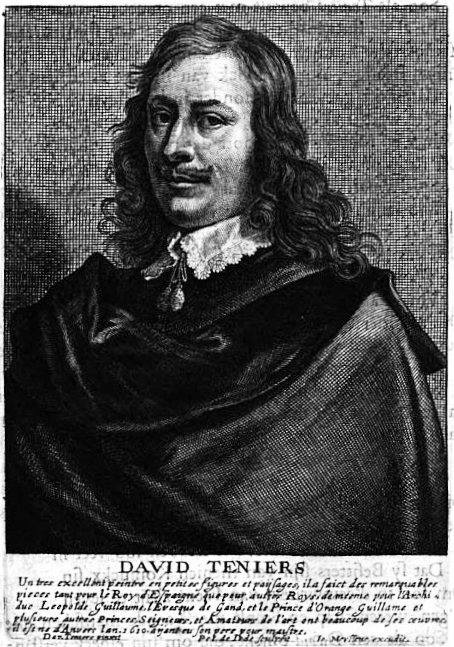
David Teniers II, page 335

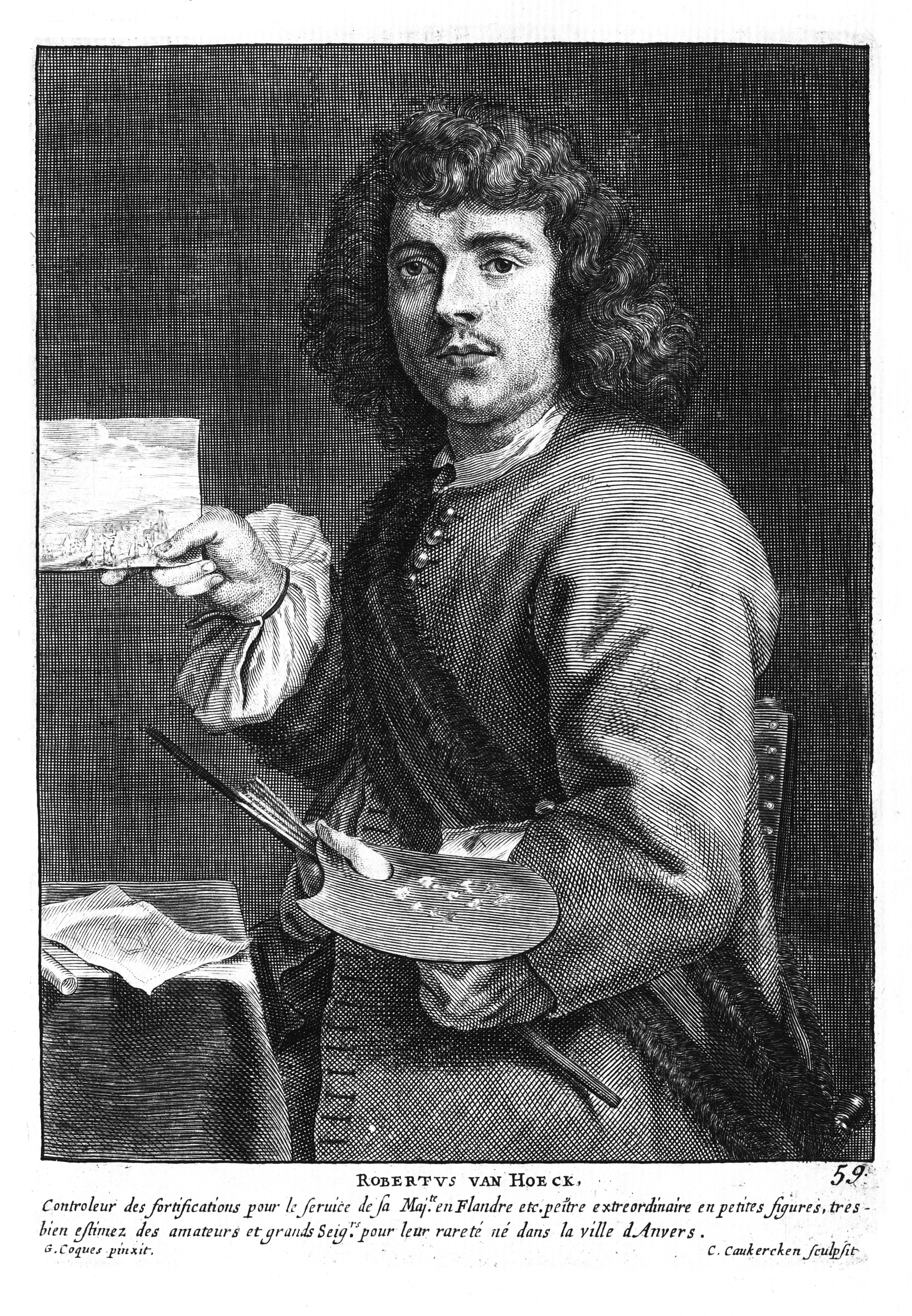
Robert van den Hoecke, page 341

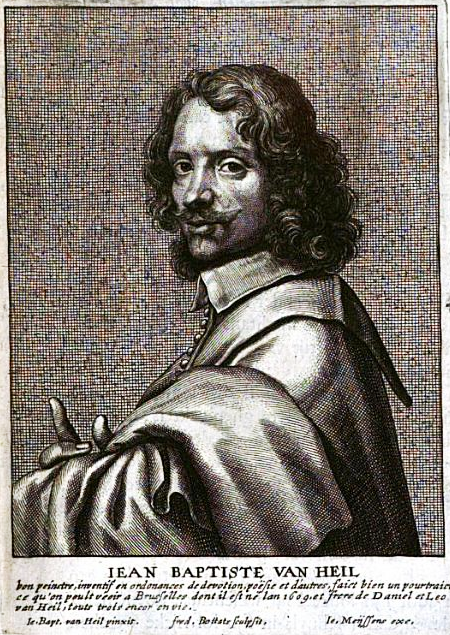
Jan Baptist van Heil, page 343

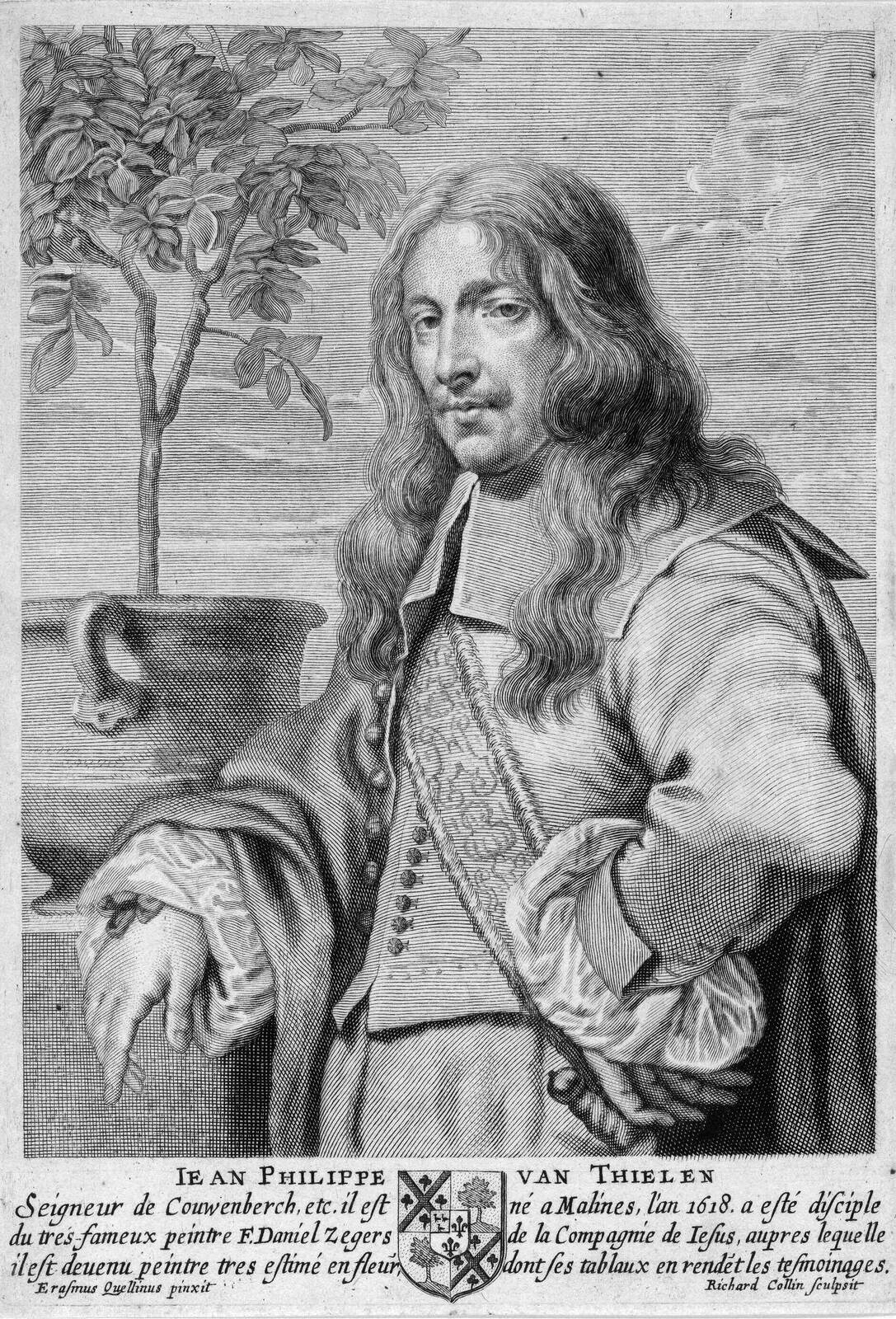
Jan Philips van Thielen, page 345

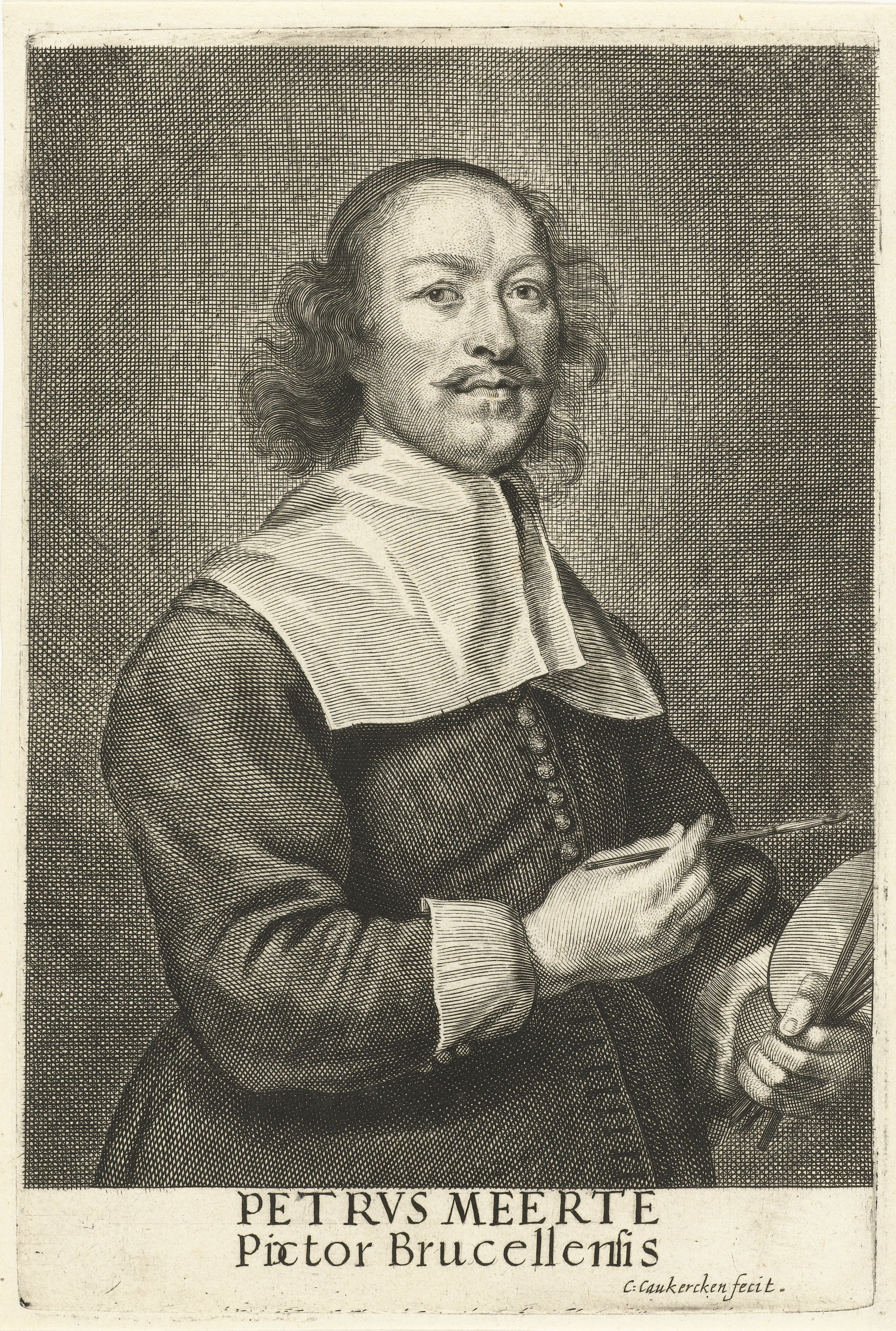
Petrus Meert, page 351

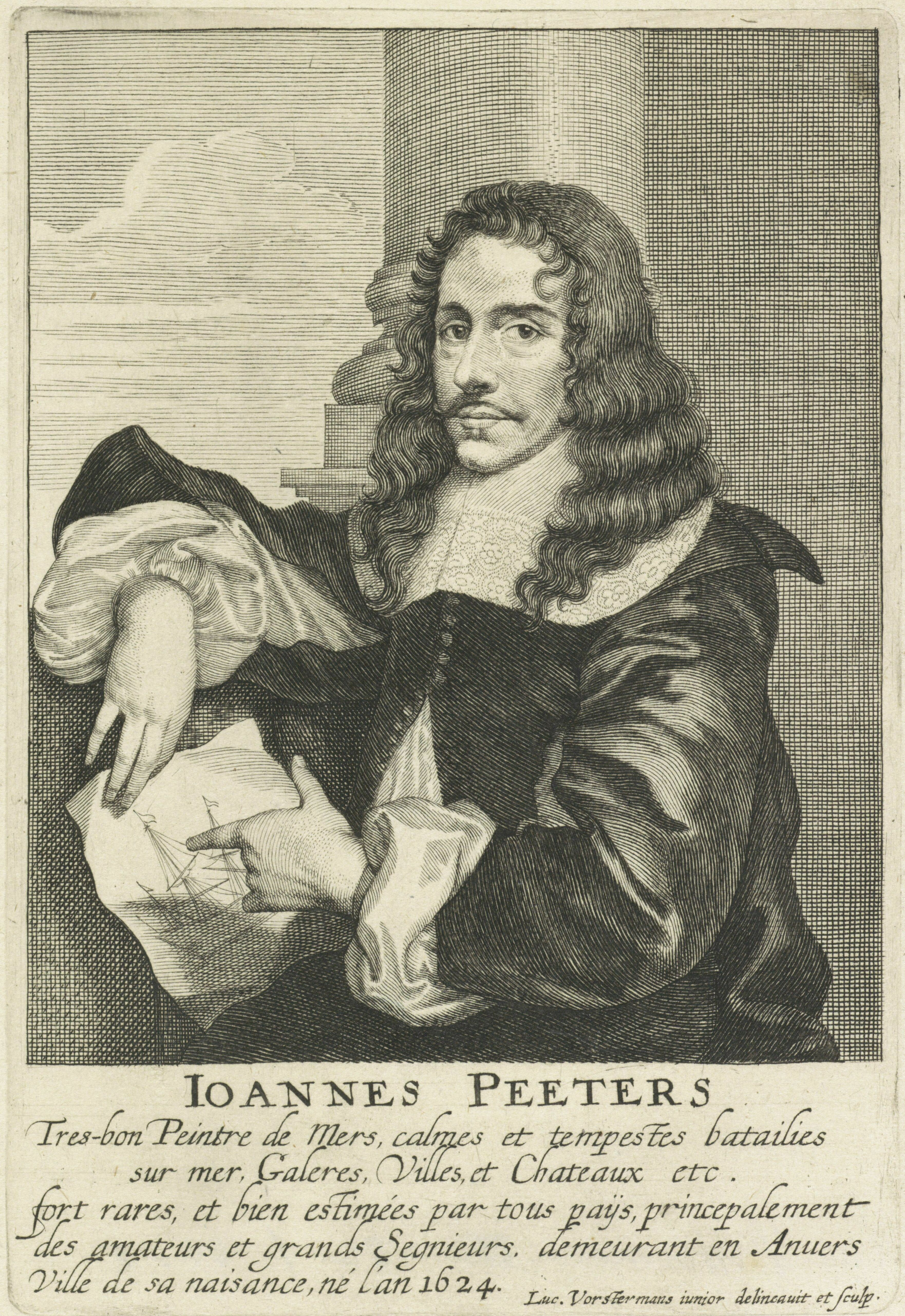
Jan Peeters I, page 355

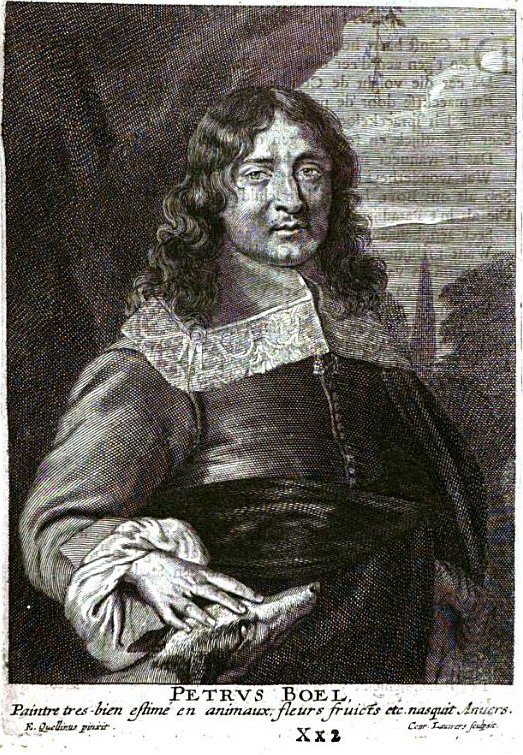
Petrus Boel, page 363

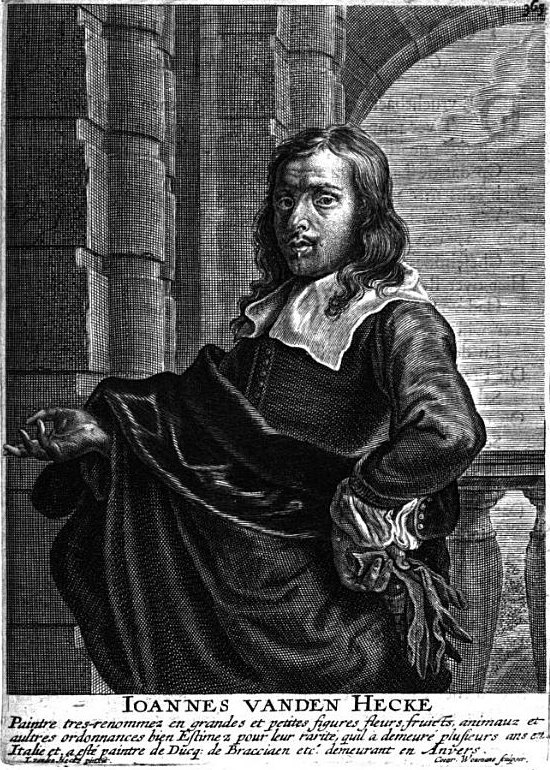
Jan van de Hecke, page 365

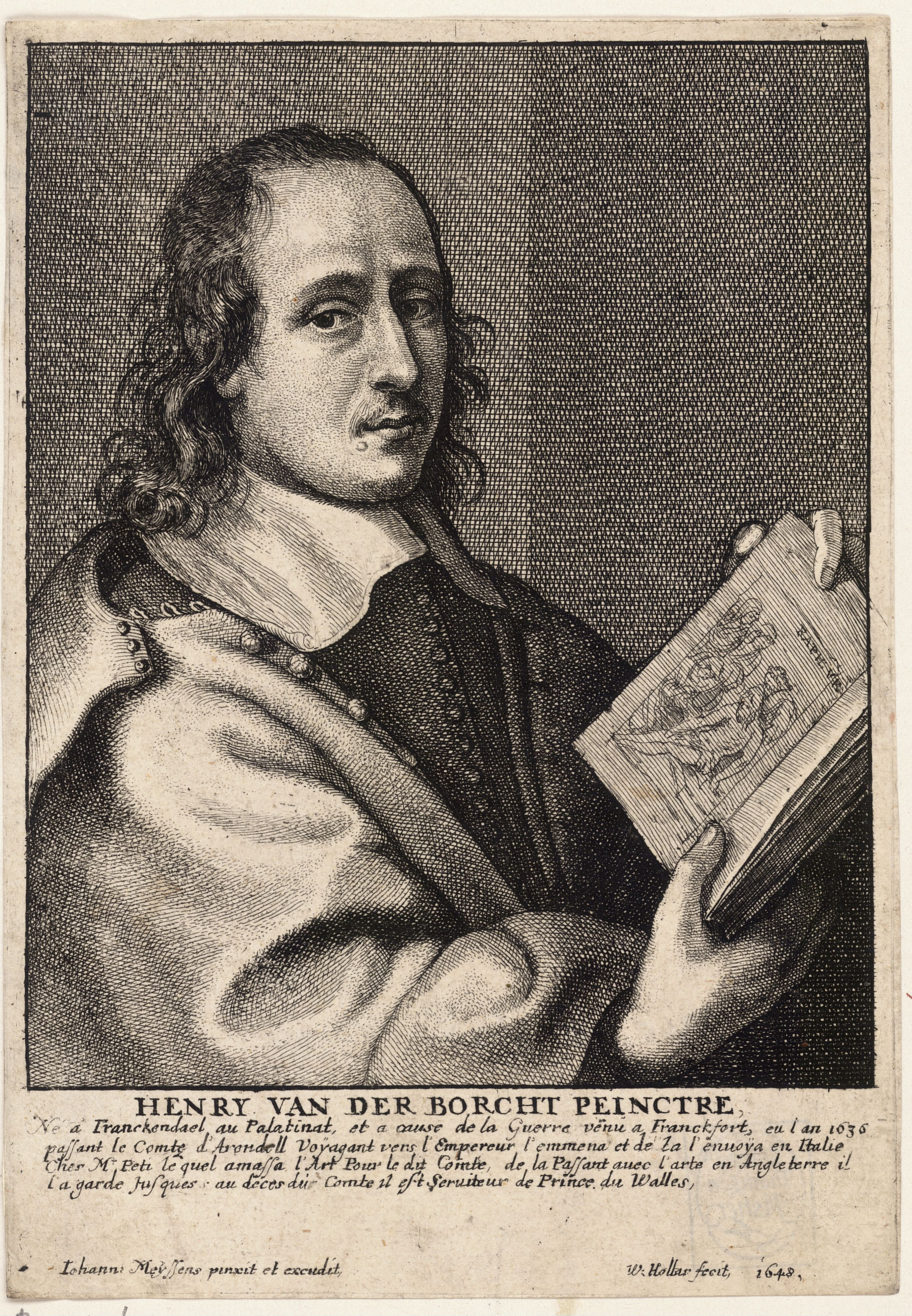
Hendrik van der Borcht II, page 383

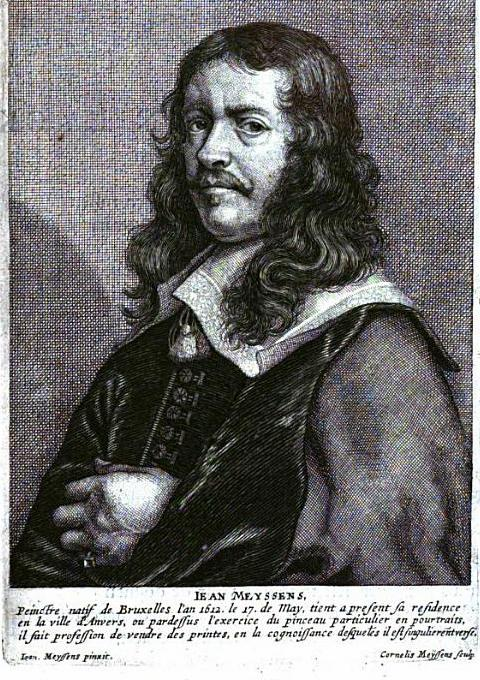
Jan Meyssens, page 387

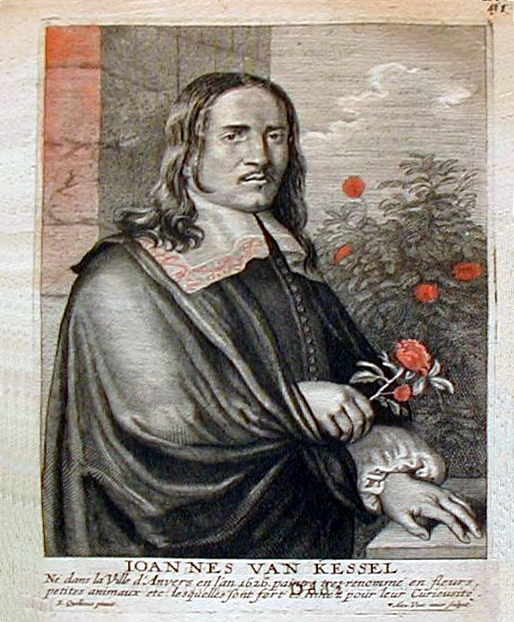
Jan van Kessel, page 411

- Daniel Seghers p 213
- Jan Davidsz. de Heem p 216
- Peter Snayers p 220
- Jacob van Es p 227
- Adriaan van Stalbemt p 228
- Lucas de Wael p 229
- Cornelis de Wael p 229
- Adriaan de Bie p 231
- Adriaen van de Venne p 235
- Paul de Vos p 236
- Simon de Vos p 237
- Jacques Jordaens p 238
- Lucas van Uden p 240
- Theodoor van Thulden p 241
- Justus Sustermans p 242
- Johannes Lievens p 243
- Simon Vouet p 243
- Gaspar de Crayer p 244
- Pieter Jansz. Saenredam p 246
- Abraham Willaerts p 247
- Jan Thomas van Ieperen p 247
- Balthazar Gerbier p 248
- Salomon Koninck p 250
- Justus van Egmont p 251
- Carolus Creten p 251
- Leonardus Bramer p 252
- Jan van Bockhorst p 254
- François Eyckens p 255
- Jan Eyckens p 255
- Peter vander Borght p 255
- Cornelis Poulenbourgh p 257
- Ostadi p 258
- Herman Swaenvelt p 259
- Hans Haringh p 259
- Erasmus Quellinus II p 260
- Claude Lorrain p 265
- Johannes Cossiers p 266
- David Bally p 271
- Philippe de Champaigne p 273
- Alexander Andriaensen p 273
- Herman Saftleven p 275
- Jacob Sandraet p 276
- Gerrit Dou p 277
- Jan Weenix p 277
- Jan van Bronckhorst p 278
- Goovaert Flinck p 280
- Pietro da Cortona p 280
- Dirk van Delen p 281
- Francesco Maltese p 282
- Bartholomeus Vander Elst p 283
- Jean Francisco Datsent p 283
- Abraham van Diepenbeeck p 284
- Giovanni Francesco Romanelli p 286
- Andreas Vacar p 297
- Nicolas Poussin p 297
- Peter Danckerse de Ry p 288
- Rembrandt p 290
- Peeter van Aelst p 291
- Albaen p 291
- Daniel van Heil p 292
- Cavailler Calabres p 294
- Giardino di Fiori p 295
- Gaspar Du Que p 295
- Andrea Sacchi p 296
- Bibiano p 296
- Michelangelo delle Battaglie p 297
- Cornelis Janssens p 298
- Jacques d'Arthois p 300
- Salvator Rosa p 303
- De Colonnen p 304
- Jan Benedetti Castilion p 305
- Hoscof p 305
- Peter van Lint p 306
- David Ryckaert p 308
- Monsieur Hans p 311
- Bernar p 311
- Pierre Patel p 311
- Nicolaes de Helt Stocade p 312
- Karel van Mander III p 314
- Dominiquin p 315
- Gonzales Coques p 316
- Cavailler Massimo p 319
- Charles Le Brun p 319
- Luigi Primo p 320
- La Hiere p 327
- Peter Tysens p 328
- Lanfranck p 330
- Sébastien Bourdon p 333
- David Teniers p 334
- Johannes Fyt p 339
- Robert van Hoeck p 340
- Jan Baptiste van Heil p 342
- Jan Philip van Thielen p 344
- Maria Theresa van Thielen p 347
- Anna Maria van Thielen p 347
- Françoise Catharina van Thielen p 347
- Johannes Coeper p 348
- Franciscus de Neve p 349
- Pieter Meert p 350
- Anthonius Rocka p 353
- Jan Peeters (I) p 354
- Peter Boel p 362
- Johannes van Heck p 365
- Gaspar van Eyck p 367
- Jan Meel p 368
- Cornelis de Heem p 369
- Johannes de Duyts p 370
- Jan Sibrechts p 373
- Joris van Schooten p 373
- Lucas Franchois p 374
- Karel Dujardin p 377
- Carel van Savoyen p 378
- Peter van Bredael p 380
- Hendrik van der Borcht II p 382
- Peter Tentenier p 384
- Gysbrecht de Hondecoten p 384
- Peter Lely p 385
- Cornelis van Berchom p 385
- Jan Meyssens p 386
- Nicolaes van Eyck p 388
- Philippus Fruytiers p 389
- Antonius Goebouw p 390
- Peter de Witte p 393
- Gaspar de Witte p 394
- Joris van Son p 402
- Frans van Mieris the Elder p 404
- Franciscus Verwilt p 405
- Jan Baptist van Deynum p 406
- Johannes van Kessel p 409
- Gysbrecht Thys p 412
- Martin Ryckaert p 413
- Artus Wolffort p 413
- Geeraert van Hoochstadt p 413
- Guiliam de Vos p 413
- Maarten Pepyn p 413
- Hendrik Berckmans p 414

== Artists in Het Gulden Cabinet, Part III ==
The engraved portraits included as illustrations in Book III are below, followed by the artists listed in order of appearance in the text. Book III begins on page 419.

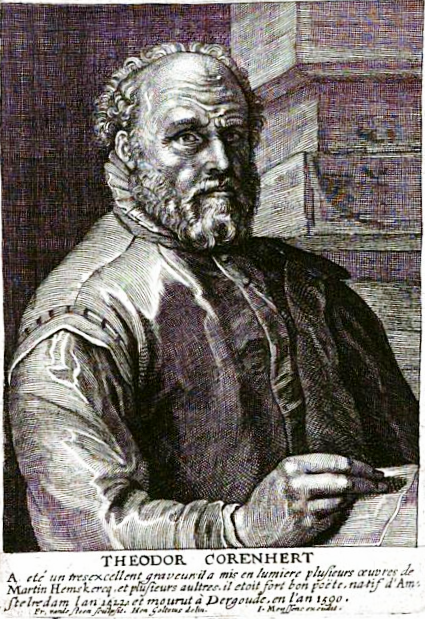
Coornhert, page 455

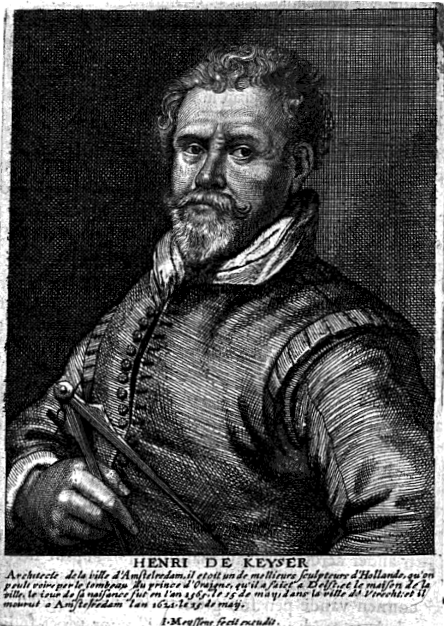
Hendrick de Keyser, page 459

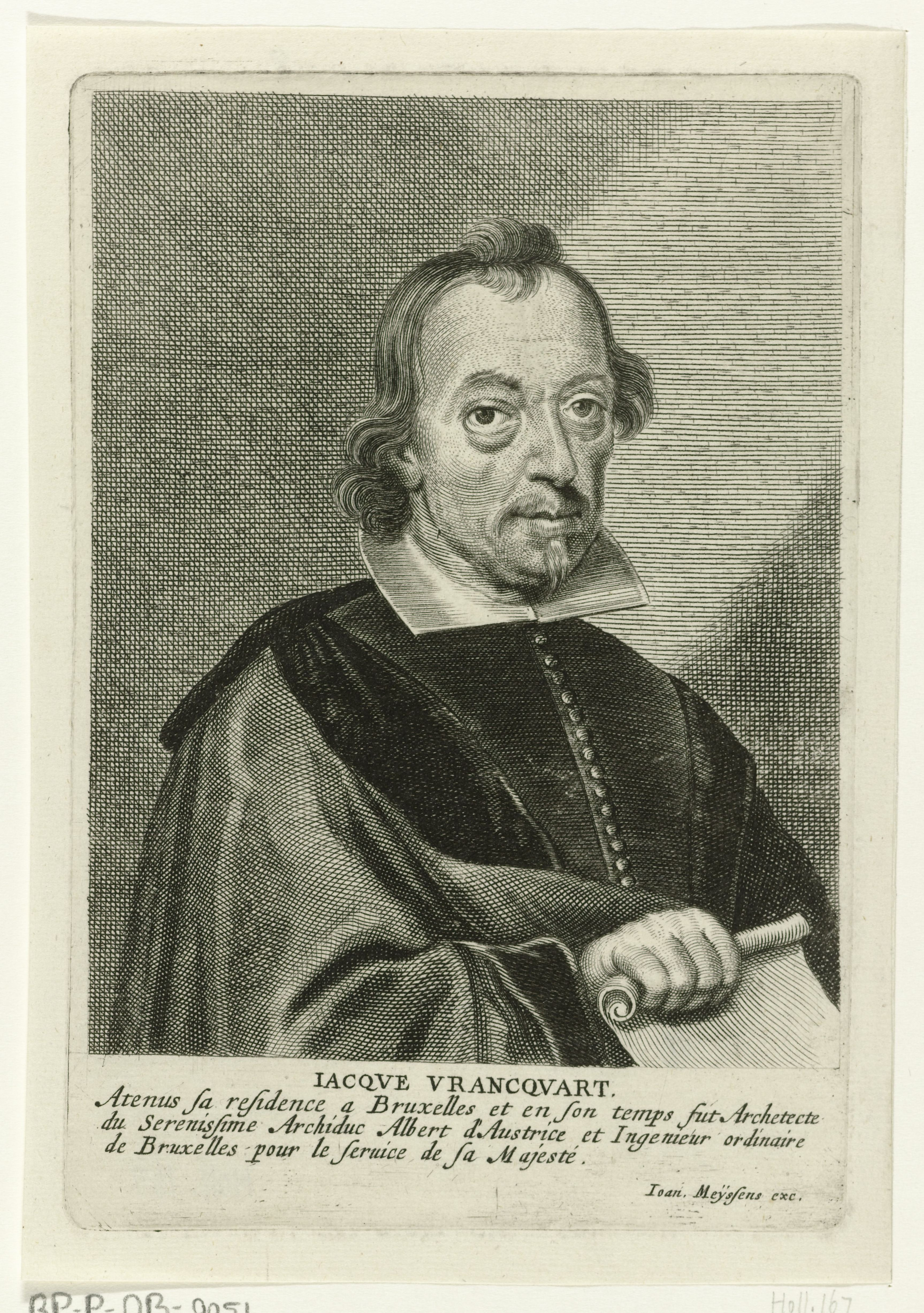
Jacob Franquart, page 479

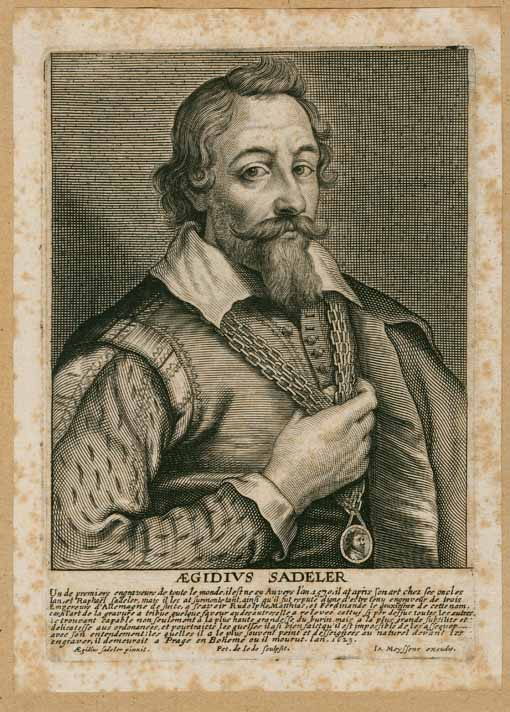
Egidius Sadeler, page 483

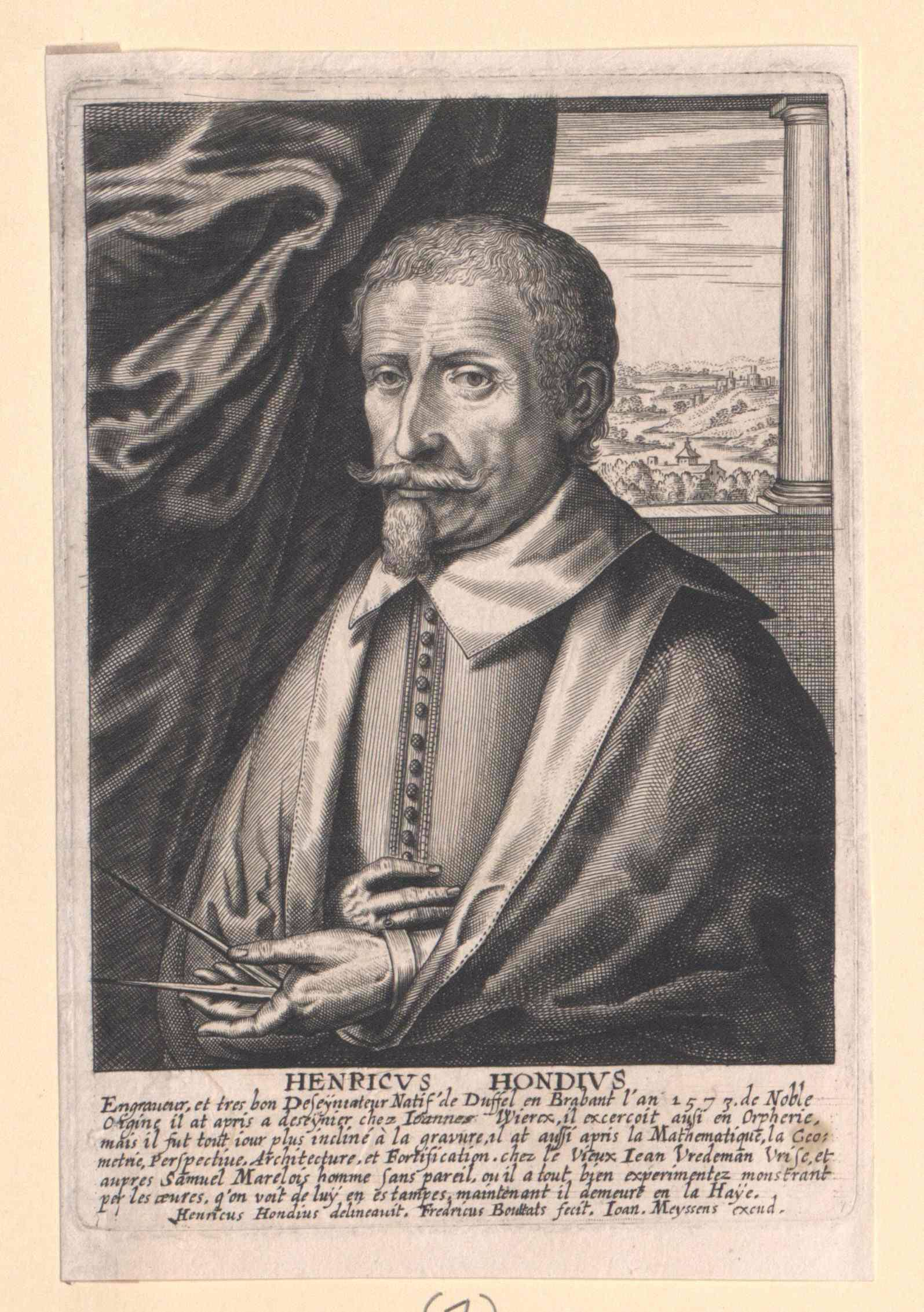
Hendrick Hondius, page 487

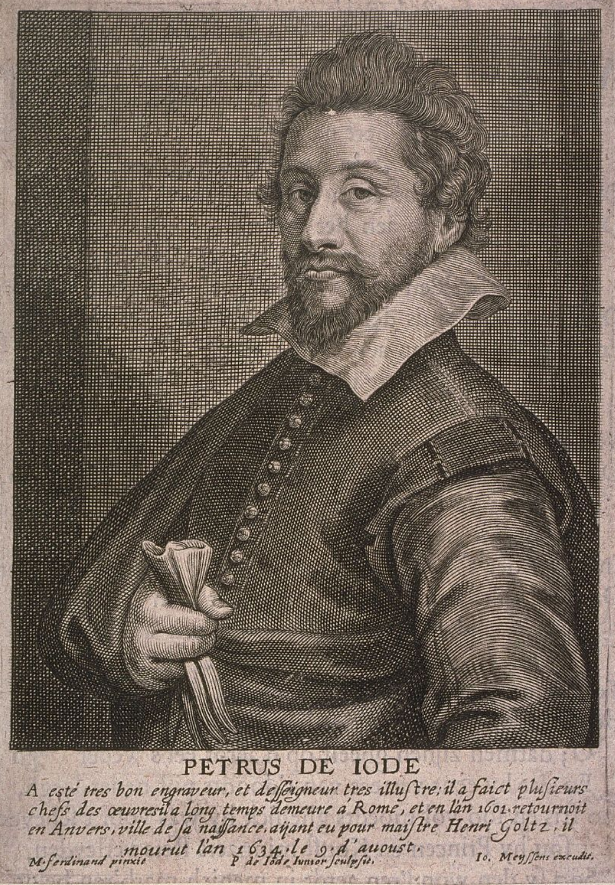
Petrus de Jode senior, page 493

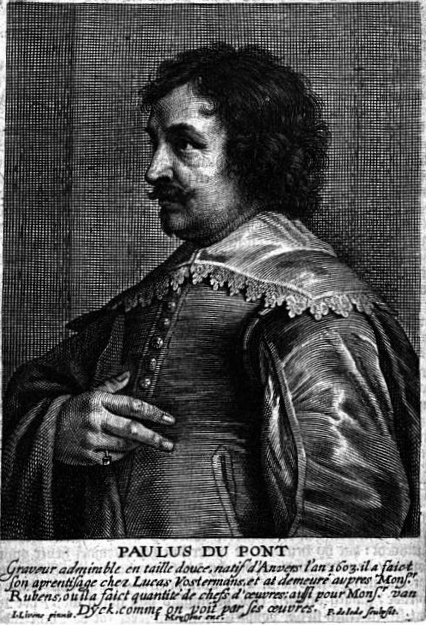
Paulus Pontius, page 497

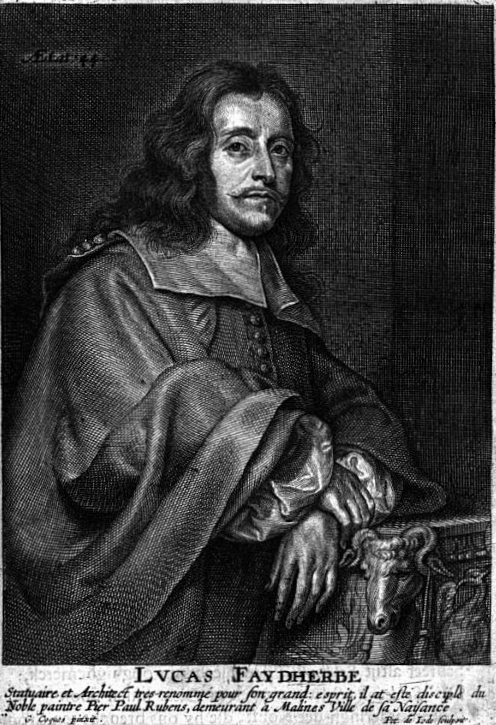
Lucas Faydherbe, page 499

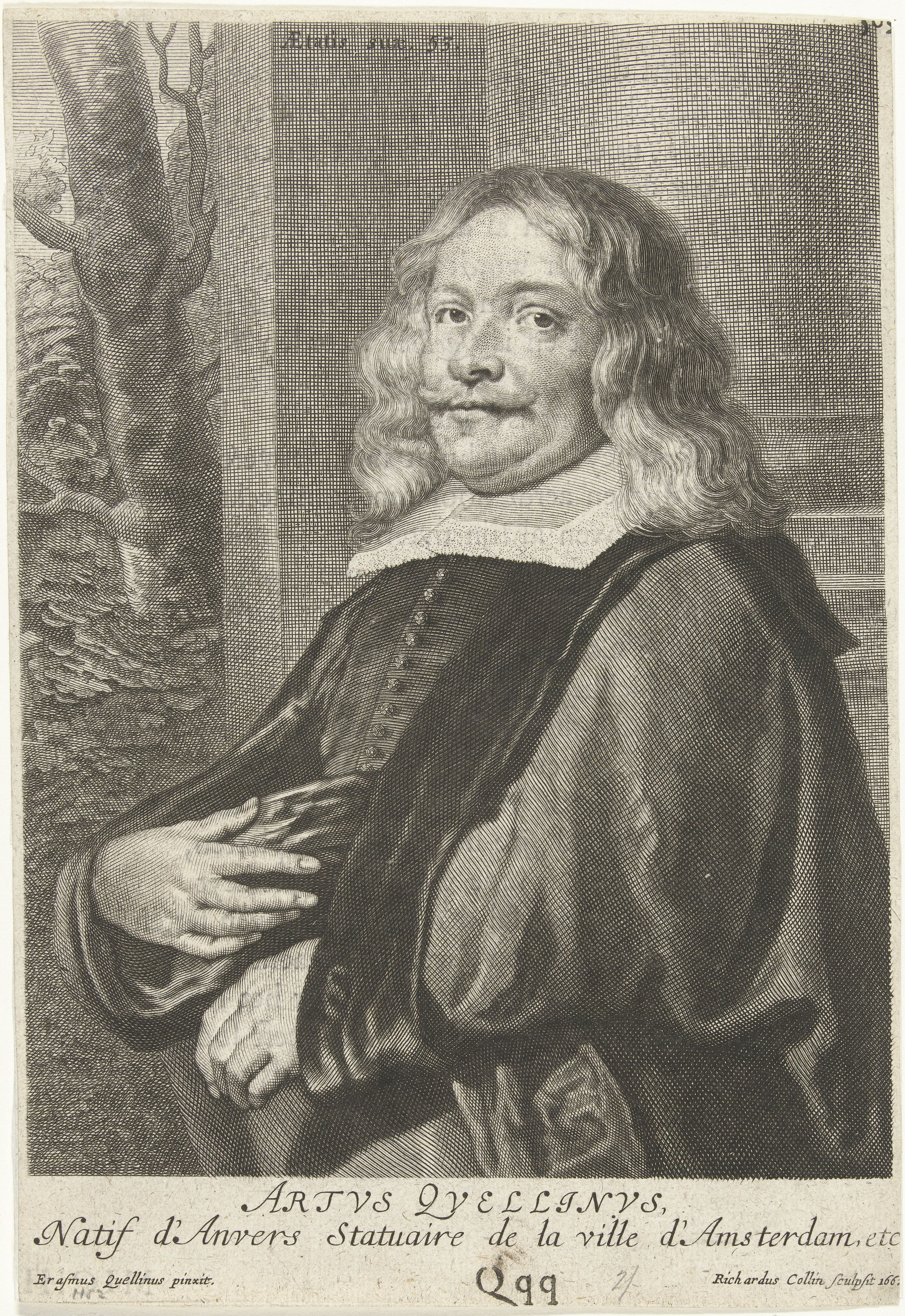
Artus Quellinus I, page 505

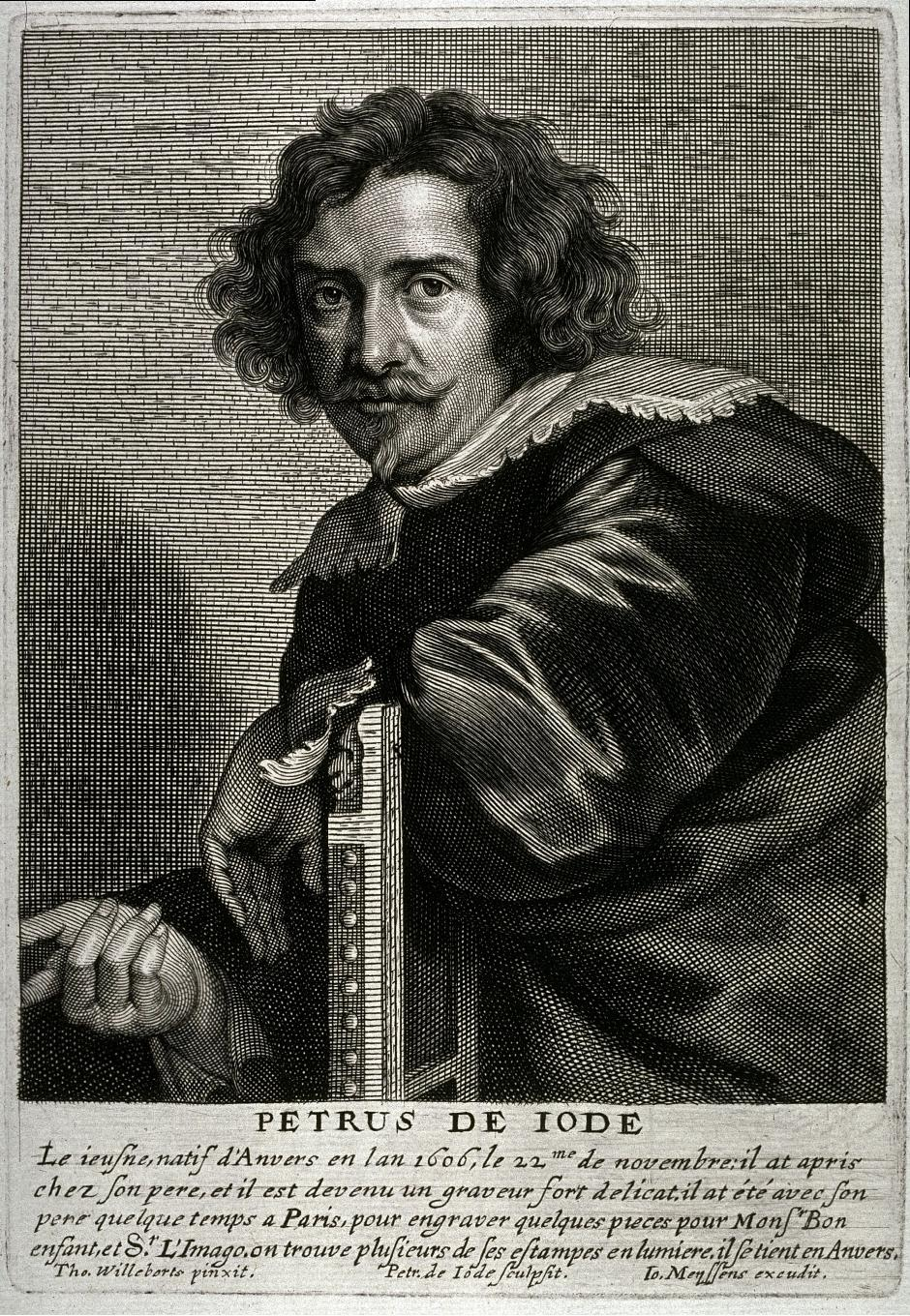
Petrus de Jode junior, page 511

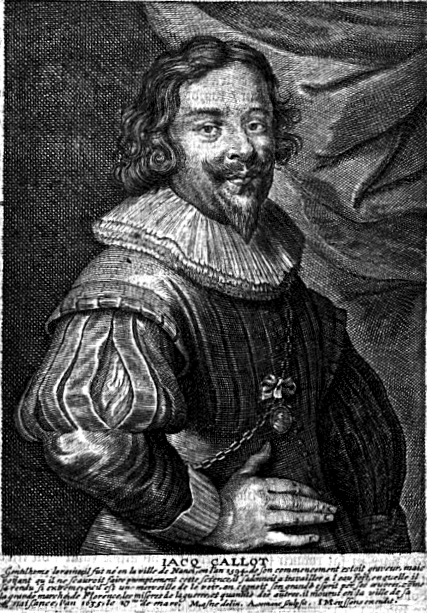
Jacques Callot, page 523

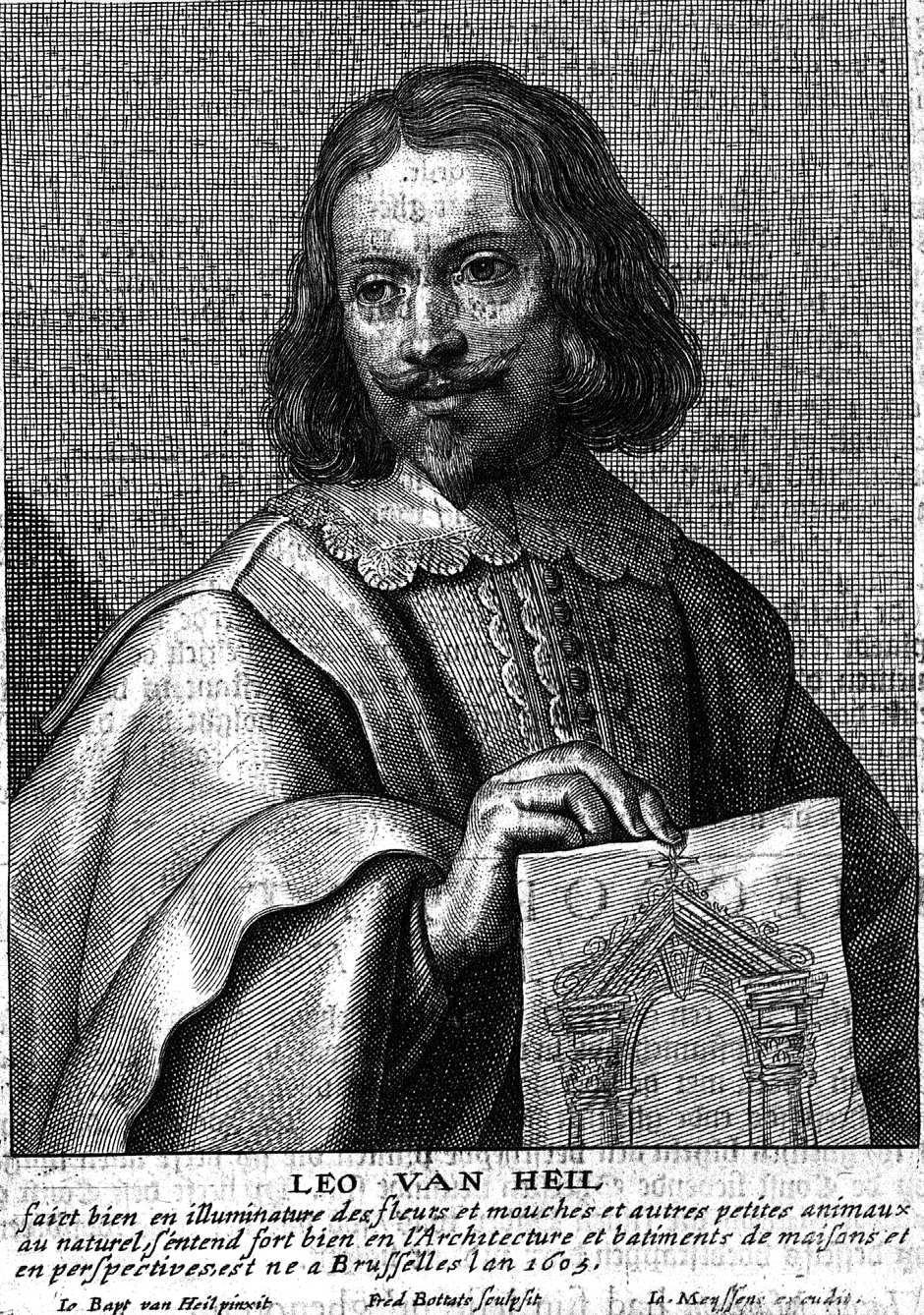
Leo van Heil, page 527

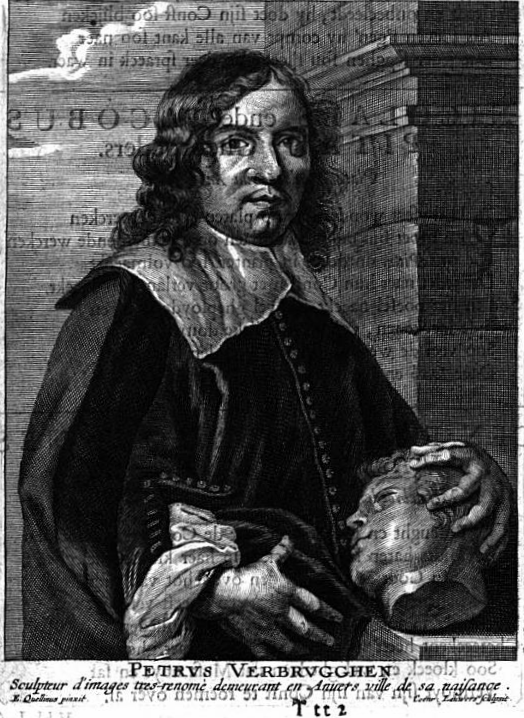
Petrus Verbrugghen, page 531

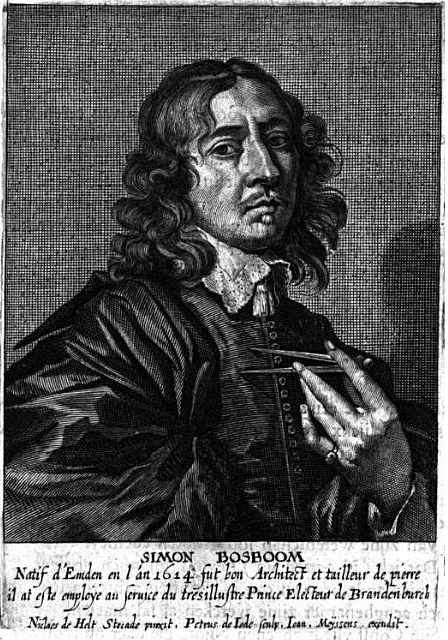
Simon Bosboom, page 547

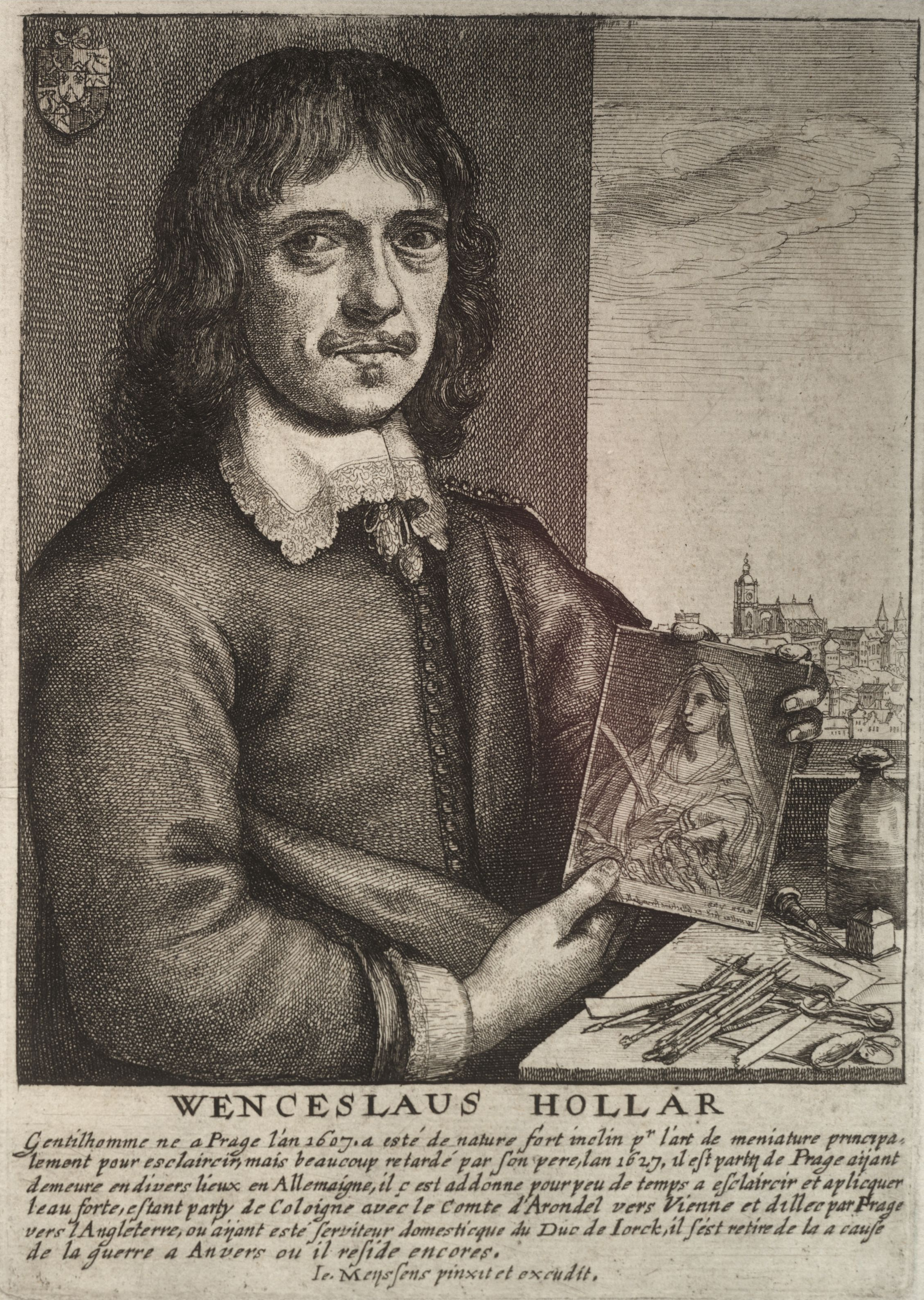
Wencelas Hollar, page 551

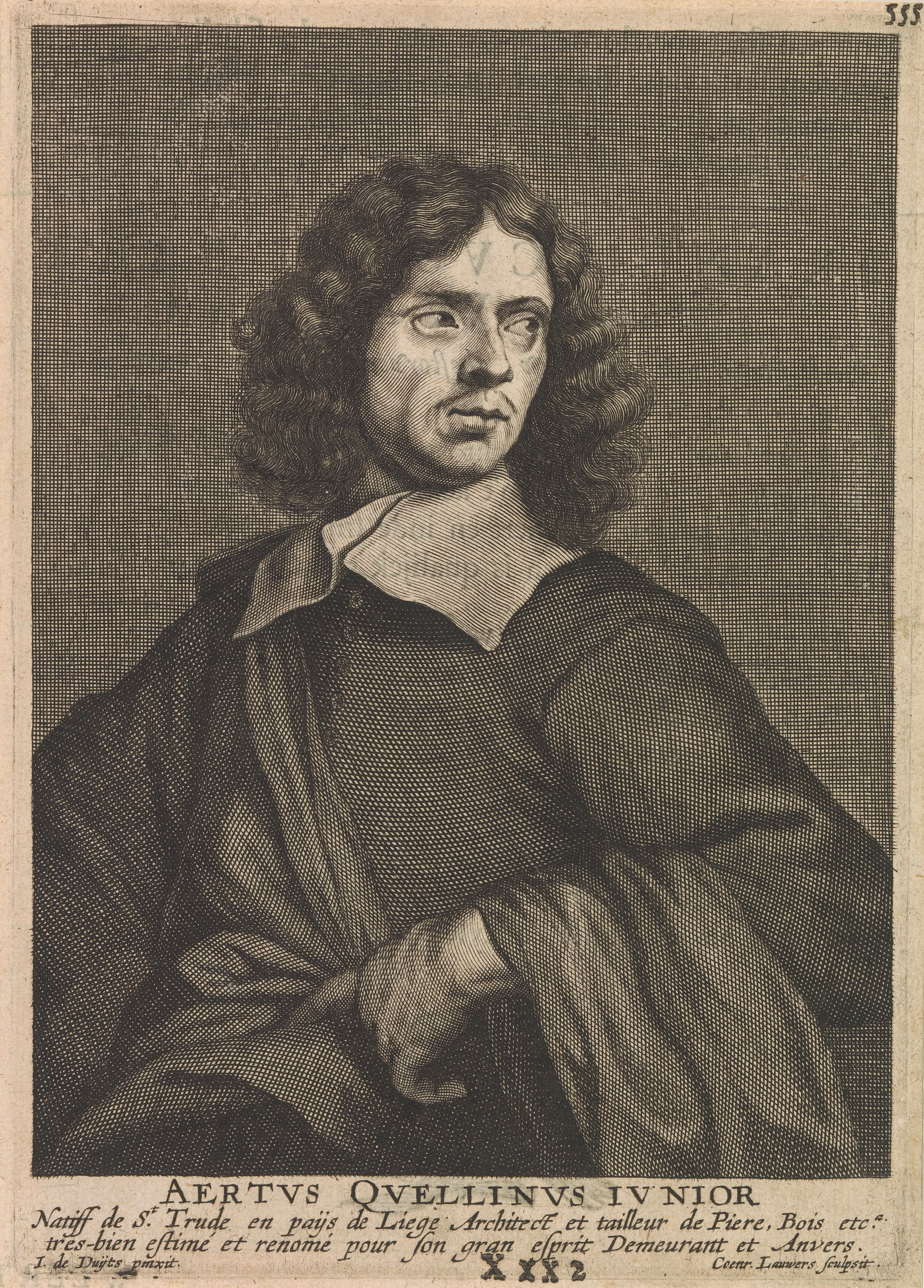
Artus Quellinus II, page 555

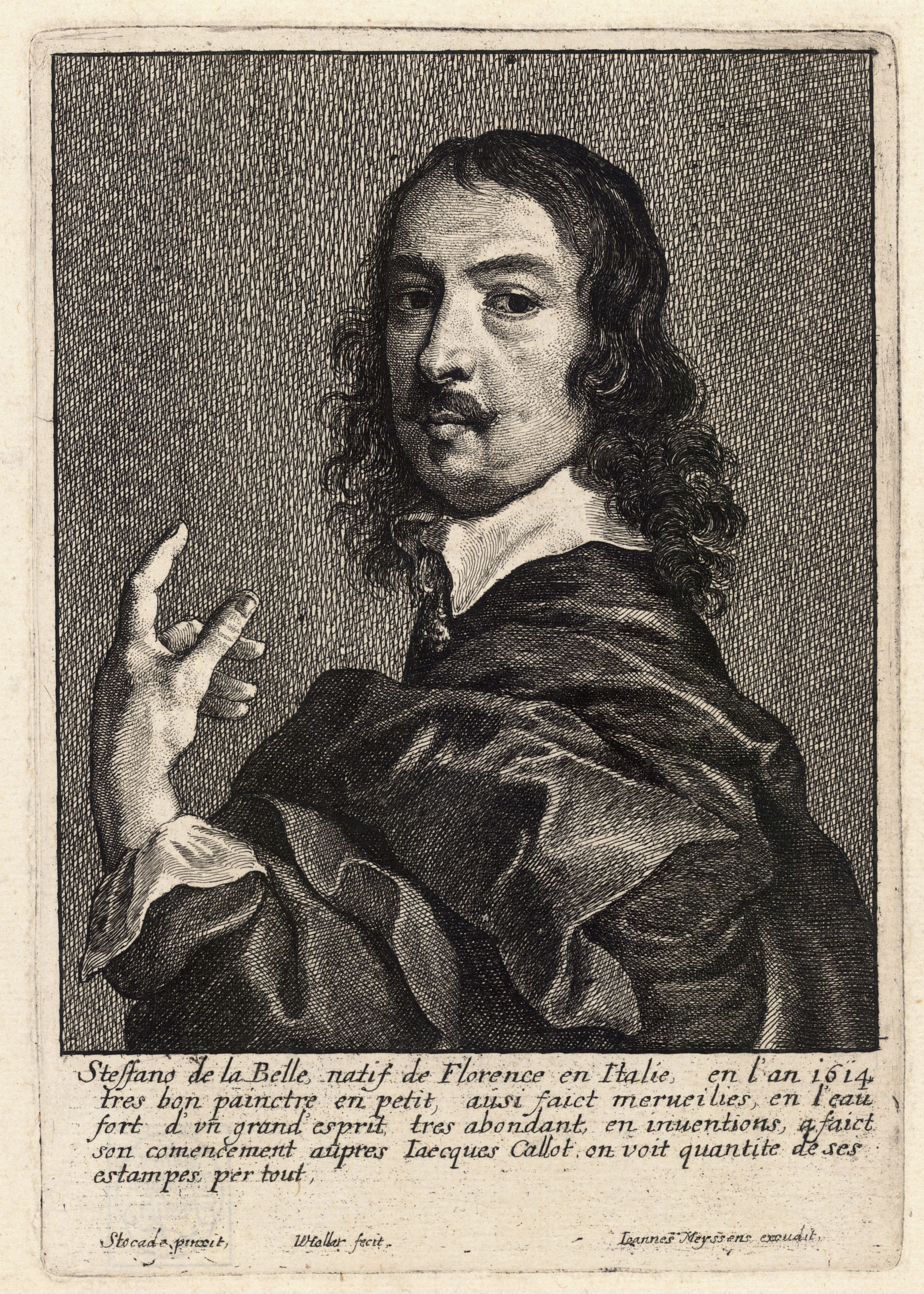
Steffano de la Belle, page 561

- François Duquesnoy p 442
- Bernini p 445
- Cornelis Danckerts de Ry p 446
- Johannes van Milder p 448
- Huybrecht vanden Eynden p 449
- Cornelis Cort p 450
- Theodorus Galle p 452
- Lucas Vorstermans the Elder p 453
- Dirck Coornhert p 454
- Andreas Colyns de Nole p 456
- Carolus de Malleri p 456
- Robertus van Voors p 457
- Hendrik de Keyser p 458
- Claes Jansz. Visscher p 461 (see note p 524)
- Jan Sadeler p 462
- Raphael Sadeler p 464
- Jacobus de Breuck p 472
- Jan Witdoeck p 473
- Nicolaes Lauwers p 473
- Jacobus Matham p 474
- Boetius Adams Bolswert p 476
- Schelte Adams Bolswert p 476
- Johannes Baptista Barbe p 477
- Jacques Francquaert p 478
- Cornelis Galle the Elder p 480
- Cornelius Galle the Younger p 480
- Jeremias Valck p 481
- Claude Melan p 481
- Egidius Sadeler p 482
- Cornelis Bloemaert p 485
- Mattheus Mereaen p 485
- Hendricus Hondius p 486
- Egidius Rousselet p 490
- Robert Nantuel p 491
- Nicolaes Loyer p 491
- Pieter de Jode I p 492
- Jan Cardon p 494
- Jean Le Potre p 495
- Paulus Pontius p 496
- Johannes Saenredam p 498
- Lanfan p 499
- Lucas Faydherbe p 500
- Michiel Lane p 502
- Alexander del Garde p 503
- Artus Quellinus p 504
- Michiel Natalis p 507
- Bertholet Flemael p 507
- Abraham Bosse p 508
- Perelle p 509
- Gerard van Opstal p 509
- Pieter de Jode II p 510
- Sebastiaen de Neve p 512
- M Koesel p 512
- Guiliam Gabron p 517
- Charles Emanuel Biset p 518
- Johannes Wierix p 520
- Jeronimus Wierix p 520
- Anthonius Wierix p 520
- Charles Erpard p 520
- François Polly p 521
- Nicolaes Polly p 521
- Jacques Callot p 522
- Leo van Heil p 526
- Lenaert van Orley p 528
- Theodor Matham p 528
- Peter vander Willighe p 529
- Peeter Verbruggen p 530
- Nicolas Pitau p 532
- Jacobus Pitau p 532
- Johannes van der Borght p 532
- Villamena p 533
- Simon Bosboom p 546
- Peeter van Schuppen p 548
- Francesco Fanelli p 549
- Wenceslaus Hollar p 550
- Franciscus vander Steen p 552
- Lucas Vorsterman the Younger p 553
- Jacobus Neefs p 553
- Artus Quellinus II p 554
- Franciscus Du Sart p 556
- Anna Schuermans p 557
- Catharina Peeters p 558
- Johanna Vergouwen p 558
- Stephanus de la Belle p 560
- Coenrard Lauwers p 562
