= Adriaenssen =

Adriaenssen is a surname. Notable people with the surname include:

- Alexander Adriaenssen (1587–1661), Flemish Baroque painter
- Ben Adriaenssen (born 1989), Belgian sidecarcross rider
- Emmanuel Adriaenssen (1554–1604), Flemish lutenist and composer
- Vincent Adriaenssen (1595–1675), Flemish Baroque painter
