= Cleve (surname) =

Cleve, van Cleve and Van Cleve are surnames. Notable people with the surname include:

- Anders Cleve (1937–1985), Swedish-speaking Finnish writer
- Astrid Cleve (1875–1968), Swedish biologist, geologist, chemist and researcher, first woman in Sweden to obtain a doctorate in science
- Bastian Clevé (born 1950), German film director
- Benjamin Van Cleve (1773–1821), a pioneer settler of Dayton, Ohio
- Brother Cleve, pseudonym of Robert Toomey (1955–2002), American musician and mixologist
- Cecilia Cleve (died 1819), Swedish librarian
- Charlotte Ouisconsin Clark Van Cleve (1819–1907), American women's suffrage advocate and social reformer
- Cornelius van Cleve (1520–1567), Netherlandish painter
- Halfdan Cleve (1879–1951), Norwegian composer
- Hendrick van Cleve III (died 1589), painter and engraver born in Antwerp
- Horatio P. Van Cleve (1809–1891), Union general in the American Civil War
- Jan Van Cleef or Cleve (1646–1716), Dutch-born Flemish painter
- Jim Van Cleve (born 1978), American musician, songwriter and producer
- John Cleve, a pseudonym of Andrew J. Offutt (1934–2013), American science fiction writer
- John Van Cleve, football player in the United States, only the fourth known professional player
- Joos van Cleve (c. 1485–1540/41), Flemish painter, father of Cornelius
- Marten van Cleve (1520–1570), Flemish painter, brother of Hendrick and probably related to Joos
- Per Teodor Cleve (1840–1905), Swedish chemist and geologist
- Richard Cleve, Canadian computer scientist
- Rudolf Cleve (1919–1997), highly decorated Luftwaffe officer of World War II
- Whitney L. Van Cleve (1922–1997), American college football player and coach
- Anders Cleve (1937–1985), Finnish writer
- Zacharias Joachim Cleve (1820–1900), Finnish pedagogue

== See also ==
- Van Cleave (surname)
