= Vincenzo Armanno =

Dutch painter (c. 1599–1649)

Vincenzo Armanno (c. 1599–1649) was a Flemish or Dutch landscape painter, who was active in Rome in the 1640s. The only source of information about Vincenzo Armanno is the 17th century Roman biographer Giovanni Battista Passeri who in his book Vite de pittori, scultori ed architetti: che anno lavorato in Roma, morti dal 1641 fino al 1673 included a chapter about Armanno. Since the publication of Passeri's book there has been a lot of speculation by art historians about the identity of this Vincenzo Armanno. Some historians have argued he is an unknown painter about whom nothing else is known while others have suggested he should be identified with one of the Flemish or Dutch painters who are known to have worked in Rome in the 1640s. Currently no works have been attributed to Vincenzo Armanno.

== Information on Vincenzo Armanno from Passeri's Vite ==
Passeri wrote that Armanno was not called by any name other than Monsieur Armanno and was from the Flemish nation. He came to Rome as an adult 'in a state of perfection'. He excelled in the painting of landscapes. He was well patronized by the aristocracy. Armanno was at some point accused of eating meat on prohibited days and times. He was locked up in the prison of the Roman Inquisition for quite a long time and then convicted to 'such punishment as is appropriate for those who ostensibly profess Catholicism but in reality live in heresy'. His punishment was reduced because of his penitence and his promise to mend his ways. He was punished to a period of 'deprivation of company' and jailed in the Dominican monastery adjacent to Santa Maria Sopra Minerva. Here he was treated courteously and painted two landscape frescoes in the sacristy of the church.

Upon his release, Armanno left Rome 'because he was ashamed of what had happened'. He started out on the return trip to his homeland. In Venice he contracted a fever from which he died a few days later at about the age of 50. Passeri describes him as 'of not disagreeable presence, but rather rude and impracticable' and as someone who did no like to talk except with his own compatriots and other Northerners.

== Who was Vincenzo Armanno? ==
Passeri is the only source about Vincenzo Armanno and nothing else is known with certainty about him. As Vincenzo Armanno is most likely not the real name of this Flemish or Dutch painter and no works are currently attributed to him, art historians have tried to figure out whom he should be identified with. Various theories have been proposed.

The chief suspects

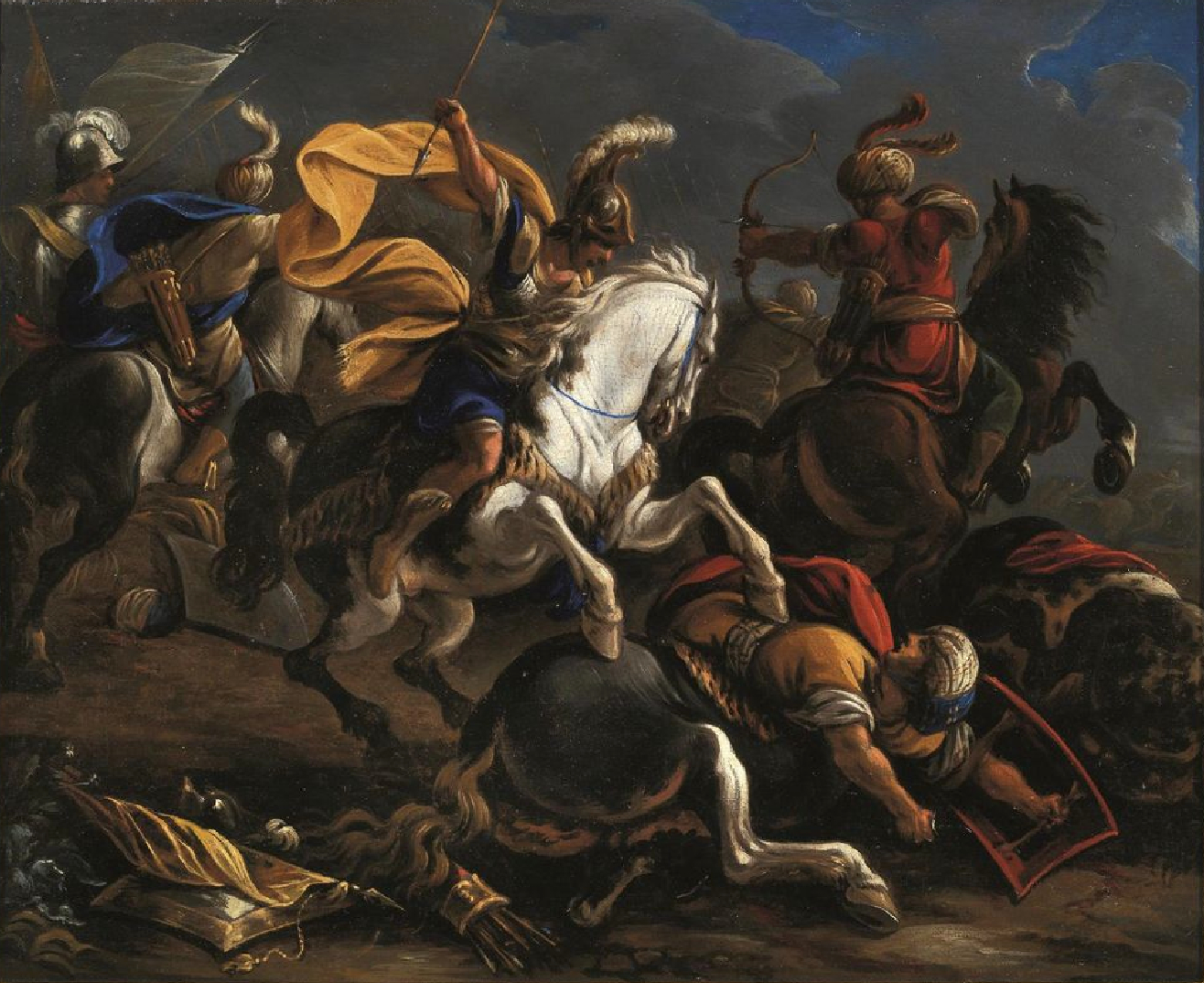
Vincent Adriaenssen, Cavalry battle between Turks and Christians

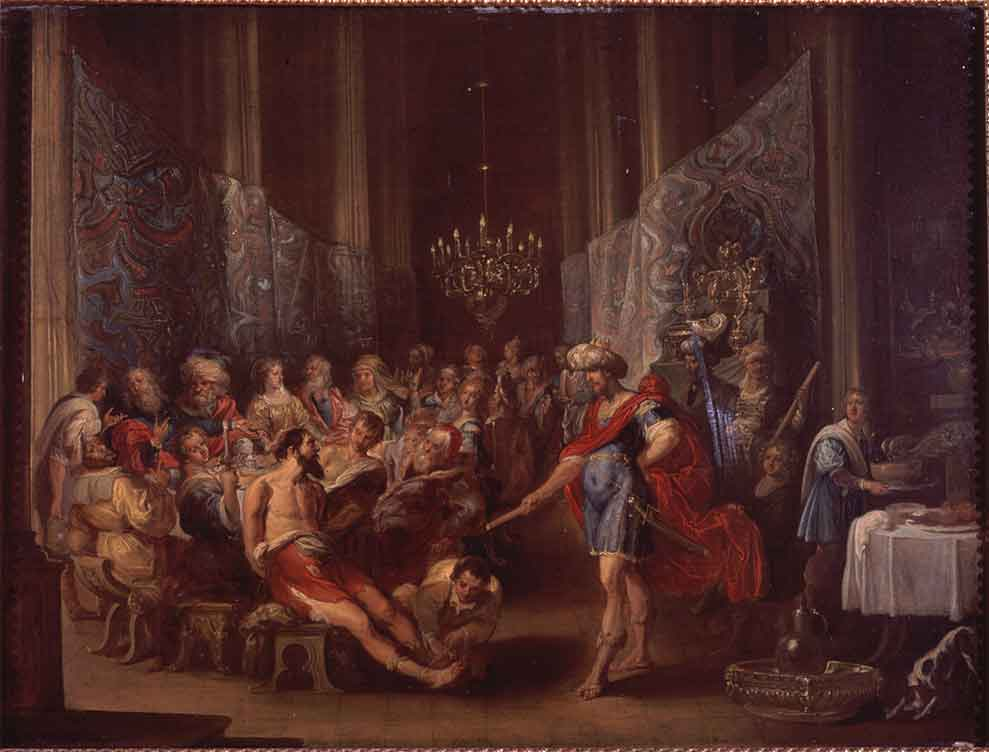
Vincent Malo, The uninvited wedding guest

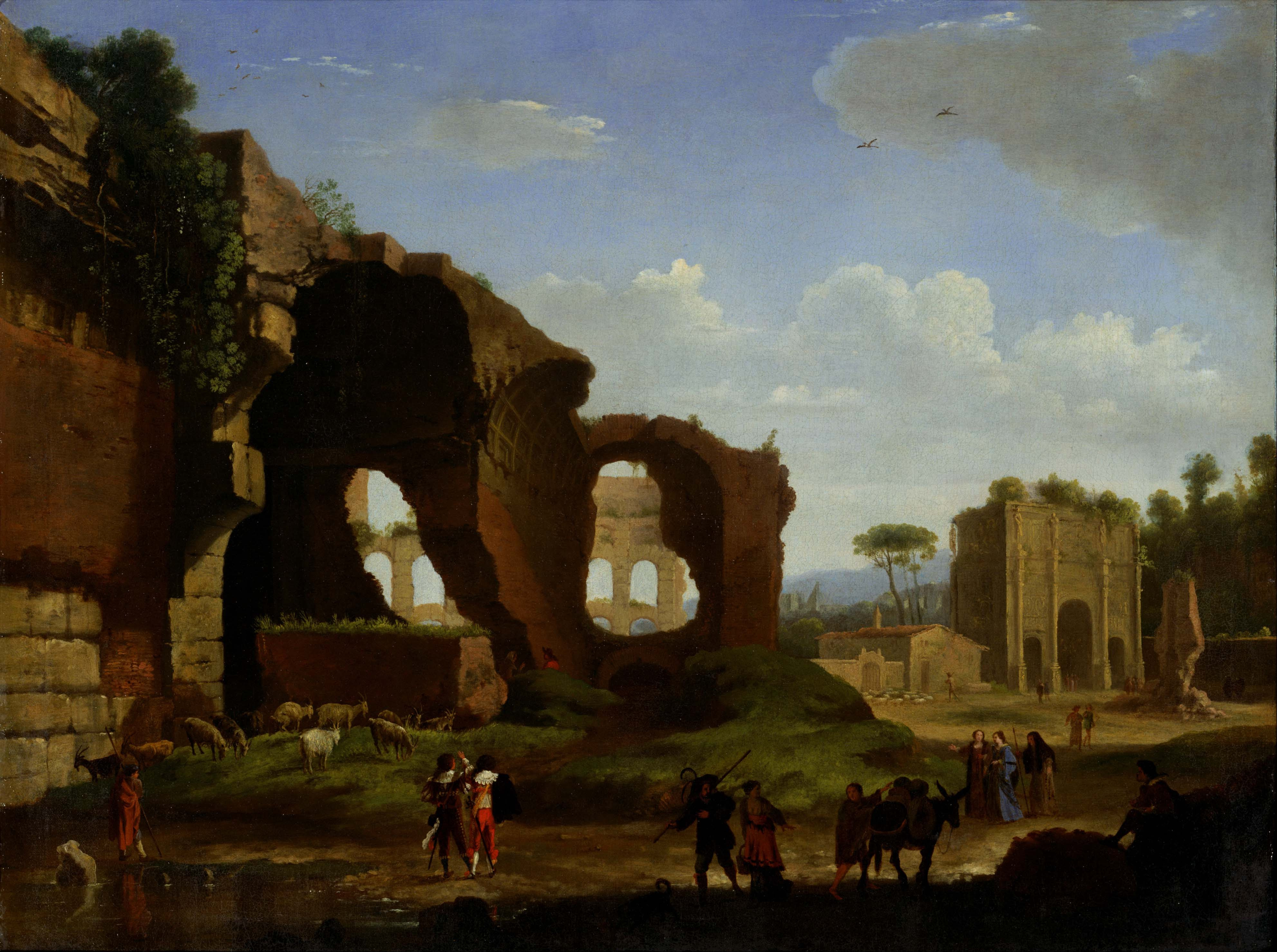
Herman van Swanevelt, A Roman View of Ruins

Timon Henricus Fokker suggested in a 1931 publication that Vincenzo Armanno should be identified with the Flemish painter Vincent Malo. The Netherlands Institute for Art History lists Vicenzo Armanno as a name variation of Vincent Malo (I).

G.J. Hoogewerff proposed in 1952 an identification with the Flemish painter Vincent Adriaenssen who was also active in Rome in the 1640s. Jacob Hess stated in 1967 that he could not agree with this identification. He argued that the real name of the artist discussed by Passeri was Vincenz Armann who is nearly unknown under this name.

Didier Bodart argued in a 1970 article against the identification of Armanno with Malo. He came to the conclusion that the Vincenzo Armanno described by Passeri should rather be identified with the Dutch painter Herman van Swanevelt. Bodart compared the biography of Vincenzo Armanno by Passeri with that of Vincent Malo by Raffaello Soprani in his 1768 publication about artists in Genoa Le vite de' pittori, scultori, ed architetti genovesi. Bodart found that there is absolutely no similarity between the lives of the individuals described in the two biographies. First, Malo is a history painter while Armanno was known for his landscapes. Secondly, Bodart showed on the basis of records in Rome that, like the Vincenzo Armanno described by Passeri, Swanevelt had been in trouble with the Catholic authorities in Rome which had resulted in a conviction by the Holy Chair. Also Passeri paints Swanevelt as someone who did not like to talk and this matches with what is suggested by Swanevelt's nickname 'eremiet' (hermit). Bodart found that in only one fact does Swanevelt's biography differ from that of Armanno: Armanno died in Venice while Swanevelt died in Paris. But in any event, neither died in Rome where the Vincent Malo of Soprani died. Other scholars, such as Susan Russell, have accepted this identification of Vincenzo Armanno with Herman van Swanevelt. The identity of Vincenzo Armanno has still not been resolved with complete certainty.
