= Van Cleve =

Van Cleve, Van Cleave or Vancleave may refer to:

== Places in the United States ==
- Van Cleve, Iowa, Marshall County, Iowa
- Vancleave, Mississippi, a census-designated place
- Van Cleve, Missouri, an unincorporated community
- Van Cleve Opera House, Hartford City, Indiana

== People ==
- Cleve (surname), which also includes people surnamed Van Cleve or van Cleve
- Van Cleave (surname), a list of people with the surname Van Cleave or Vancleave
