= Van Cleef =

Van Cleef is a Dutch surname. Notable people with the surname include:

- Jan Van Cleef (1646–1716), Flemish painter
- Joos van Cleve (also spelled Jos van Cleef) (1485–1540), painter from Cleves
- Cornelius van Cleve (1520–1567), painter and son of Joos
- Lee Van Cleef (1925–1989), American film actor who primarily starred in westerns
- June Van Cleef (born 1941), American photographer
- Nathan van Cleef, one of the villains of Shanghai Noon (modeled after Lee Van Cleef)

== See also ==
- Van Cleef & Arpels, French jewelry house
