= Vincent Malo =

Flemish painter (c. 1604–1644)

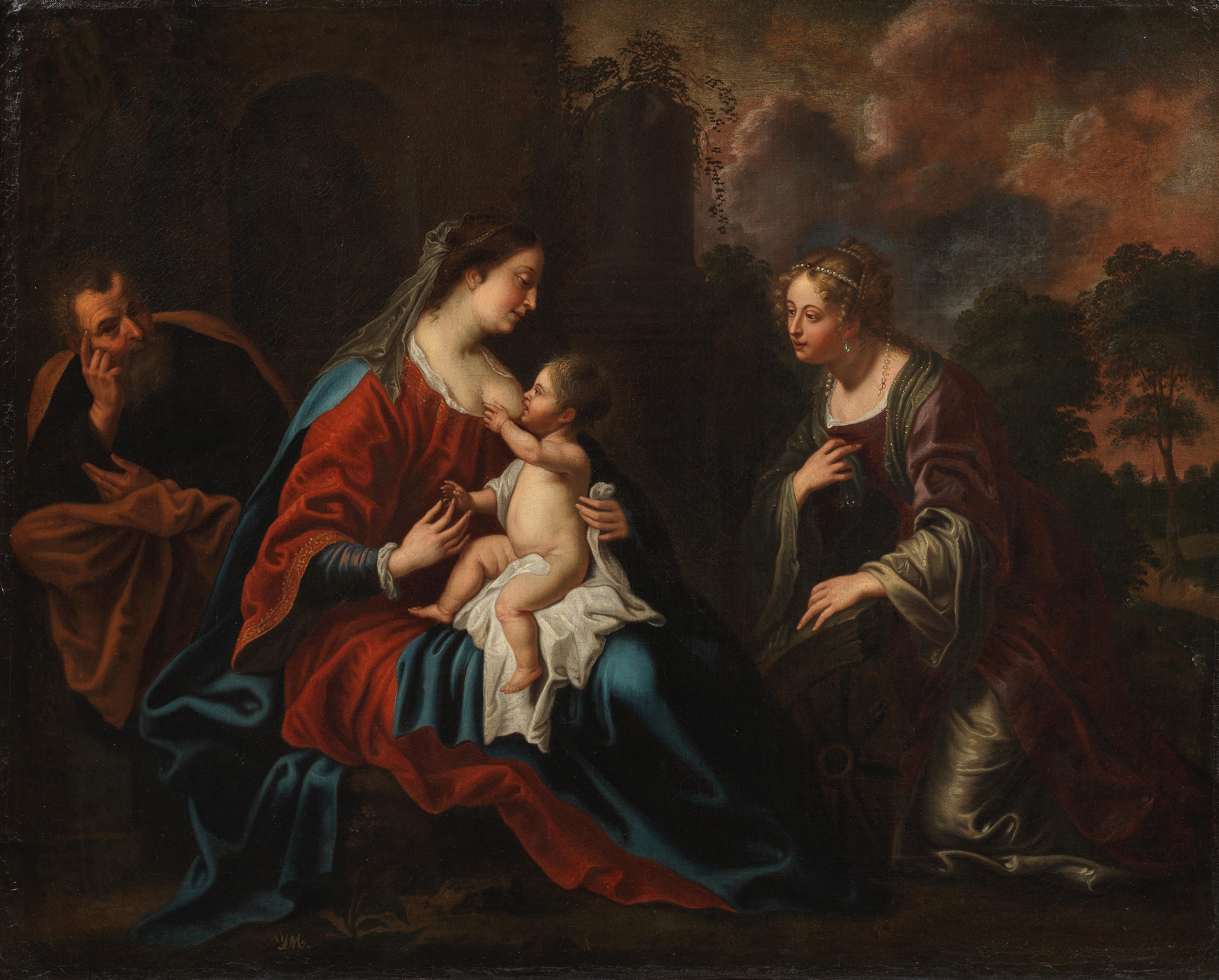
Madonna and Child with Saint Catherine of Alexandria

Vincent Malo or Vincent Malo I (Cambrai c. 1602 or 1606 – Rome, 14 April 1644) was a Flemish painter who after training and working in Antwerp was mainly active in Italy, where he was known, amongst others, as Vincenzo Malo, Vincenzo Malò and Vincenzio Malo. Vincent Malo painted genre scenes as well as religious and mythological subjects and, occasionally, portraits.

== Life ==
Due to a lack of reliable sources, the details of Vincent Malo's life are not well established. In 1662 the Flemish biographer Cornelis de Bie called him the "Great master Vincent Malò" and praised him for his skill in painting large- and small-scale works, in particular of nudes. De Bie did not specify any dates for Malo. The earliest biographer naming a Vincenzio Malo is Raffaello Soprani in his 1768 publication about artists in Genoa Le vite de' pittori, scultori, ed architetti genovesi. This book is still our primary source of information on Malo. The date of birth of Vincent Malo is not known. In a document of 12 March 1637 the painter declares to be 31 years old, which would indicate he was born in 1606. The registers of the parish of San Lorenzo in Lucina in Rome record that the painter died there on 14 April 1644 at about 42 years old which suggests a birth date around 1602.

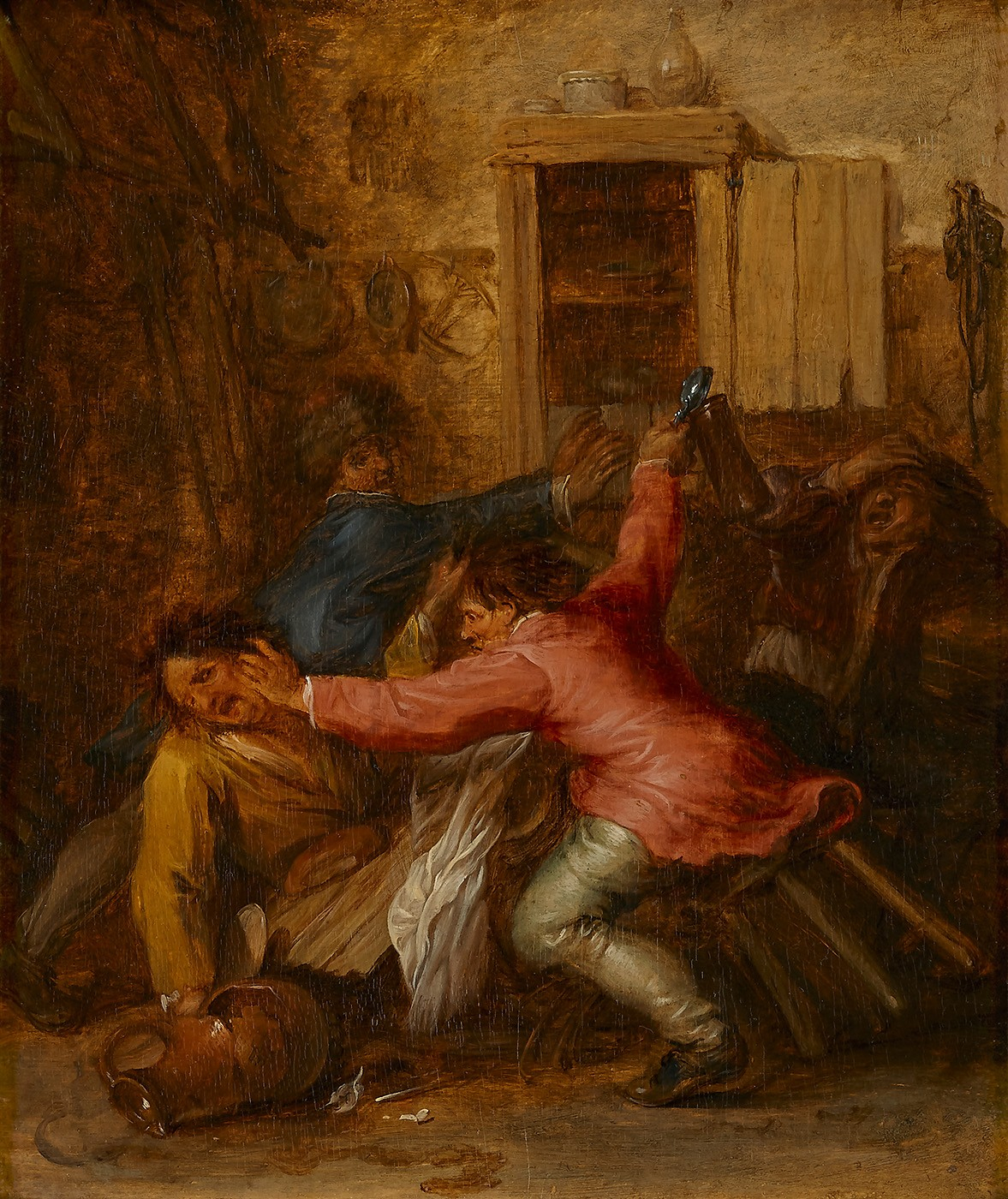
Interior with fighting peasants

De Bie mentions that Malo was a pupil of the leading Flemish Baroque painter David Teniers the Elder while Soprani states that he studied in addition with Peter Paul Rubens. The fact that certain of Malo's works show his knowledge of the drawings used in Rubens' workshop is regarded as evidence that Malo did spend time in Rubens' workshop. From his two masters he would have learned the Flemish Baroque style of painting. From 1623 to 1634 he was active in Antwerp. During this period he was a member of the Antwerp Guild of St. Luke. He married in Antwerp and had a son also named Vincent in 1629. His son would later become a painter and be known as Vincent Malo II.

He moved to Genoa in Italy after 1634. He lived and collaborated with fellow Flemish painter Cornelis de Wael, who played a pivotal role in the Flemish artistic community in Genoa. Genoa was at the time an attractive destination for artists since the competition between artists there was less intense than in the leading cultural centres Rome, Florence and Venice. Genoa was a thriving port city where a large number of potential patrons and collectors lived. In Genoa Malo completed various commissions for local churches and palaces.

Malo later travelled to Florence with his family and resided and worked there for a while. He then travelled to Rome around 1642. He died in Rome on 14 April 1644. His family returned to Antwerp and in 1652 his son was admitted in the local Guild of St. Luke as the son of a master.

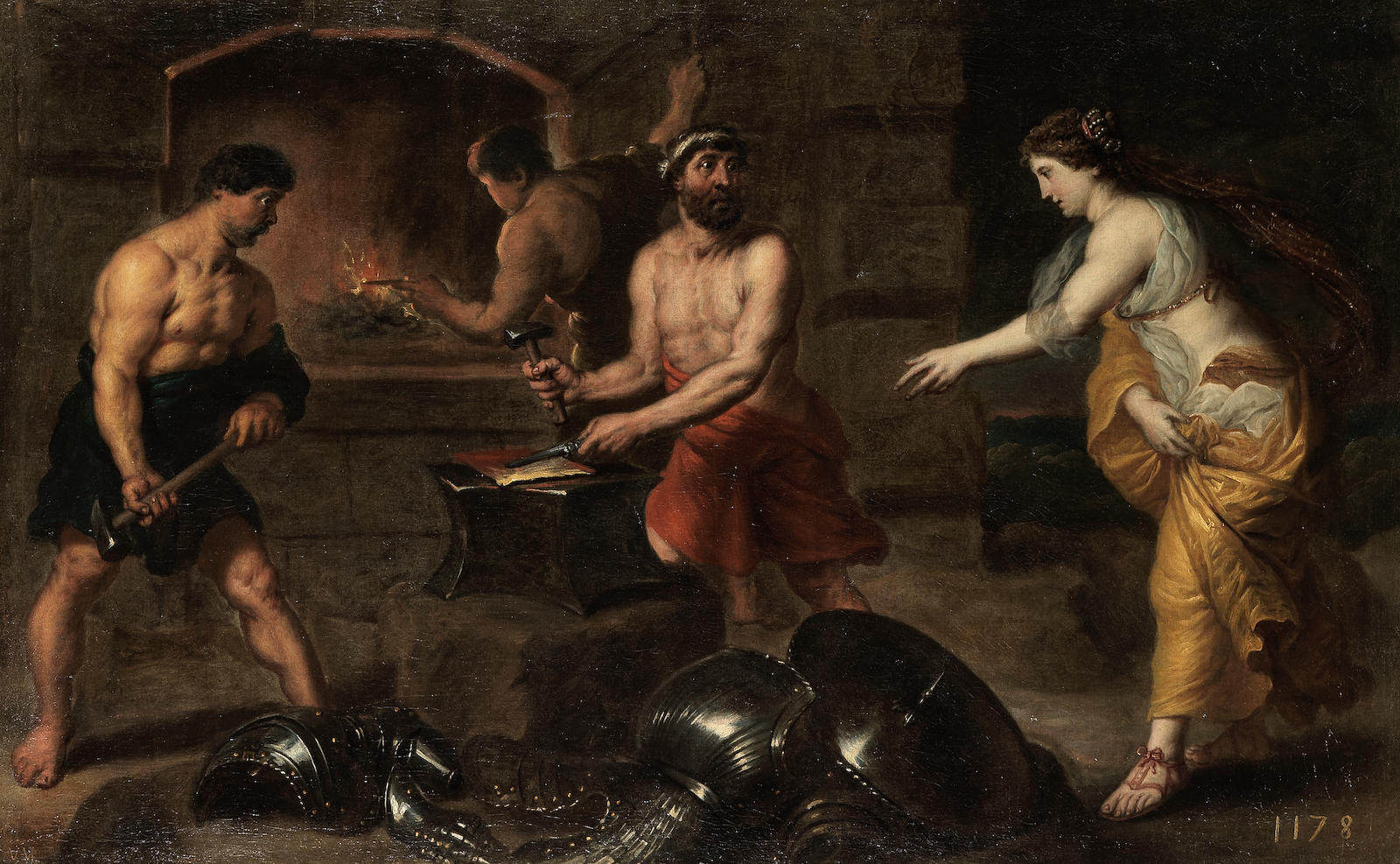
Venus in the forge of Vulcan

Flups Mertens, Jakes Clasens and the still life painter Isaac Wigans were his pupils in Antwerp and Antonio Maria Vassallo was his pupil in Genoa.

== Mix-up of Vincent Malo with other artists ==
The art historian Timon Henricus Fokker suggested in a publication of 1931 that Vincenzo Malo should be identified with the Vincenzo Armanno described in Passeri's book Vite de pittori, scultori ed architetti: che anno lavorato in Roma, morti dal 1641 fino al 1673. The art historian Didier Bodart argued in a 1970 article against this identification. He expressed the view that the Vincenzo Armanno described by Passeri should rather be identified with the Dutch painter Herman van Swanevelt. Bodart compared the biography of Vincenzo Armanno by Passeri with that of Vincent Malo by Soprani. He concluded that the lives of the two persons described in these biographies are completely dissimilar and that Armanno and Malo were clearly two different persons. Moreover, some facts recorded about van Swanevelt's life such as his troubles with the Holy Office in Rome and his specialisation as a landscape painter made him the more likely candidate for identification with Vincenzo Armanno. The matter of the identity of Vincenzo Armanno has still not been resolved with certainty.

Charity

Vincent Malo has also been confused with the Flemish painter Vincent Adriaenssen who worked for a significant time in Rome. In fact, both painters called Malo (Vincent Malo I and Vincent Malo II) had died before Vincent Adriaenssen. Today it is assumed that Malo mainly made religious and genre works and Adriaenssen painted battle scenes.

== Works ==
Vincent Malo was a painter of genre scenes and of religious and mythological subjects and occasional portraits. While his early works retain Mannerist traits, his mature works showed a Baroque style close to that of Rubens and van Dyck.

He collaborated with other Antwerp painters. He added figures in the land- and seascapes of Andries van Eertvelt and Gijsbrecht Leytens and also collaborated with Cornelis de Wael during his stay in Genoa.

Works of Vincenzo Malo are held in the collections of the Accademia Ligustica di Belle Arti (Genoa), Palazzo Bianco (Genoa), Palazzo Colonna (Rome), Galleria nazionale di Parma (Parma), Vatican Museums (Rome), Pinacoteca di Brera (Milan), the Rijksmuseum (Amsterdam), the Indiana University of Pennsylvania Art Gallery (Indianapolis). The Royal Collection holds three religious paintings attributed to Malo but these attributions are not firm.
