= Van Cleave (surname) =

Van Cleave is a surname. Notable people with the surname include:

- A. R. VanCleave (1889–1987), American football coach
- Aaron Van Cleave (born 1987), U.S./Canadian pair skater
- Ira Van Cleave, American football coach
- Nathan Van Cleave (1910–1970), American composer and orchestrator known as Van Cleave
- Ryan G. Van Cleave (born 1972), American author and teacher
- William Van Cleave (1935–2013), American political scientist, advisor to President Ronald Reagan

== See also ==
- Vancleave, Mississippi, United States, a census-designated place
- Van Cleave, Kentucky, an unincorporated community
- Van Cleve
- Cleve (surname), includes Van Cleve
- Van Cleef, a surname
