= Stenroos =

Stenroos is a surname. Notable people with the surname include:

- Albin Stenroos (1889–1971), Finnish long-distance runner and Olympic marathon champion
- Kaarlo Eemeli Kivirikko (born Karl Emil Stenroos; 1870–1947), Finnish zoologist, school teacher and non-fiction writer
- Soili Stenroos (born 1958), Finnish lichenologist and curator
