= Aukusti Juhana Mela =

Finnish botanist (1846–1904)

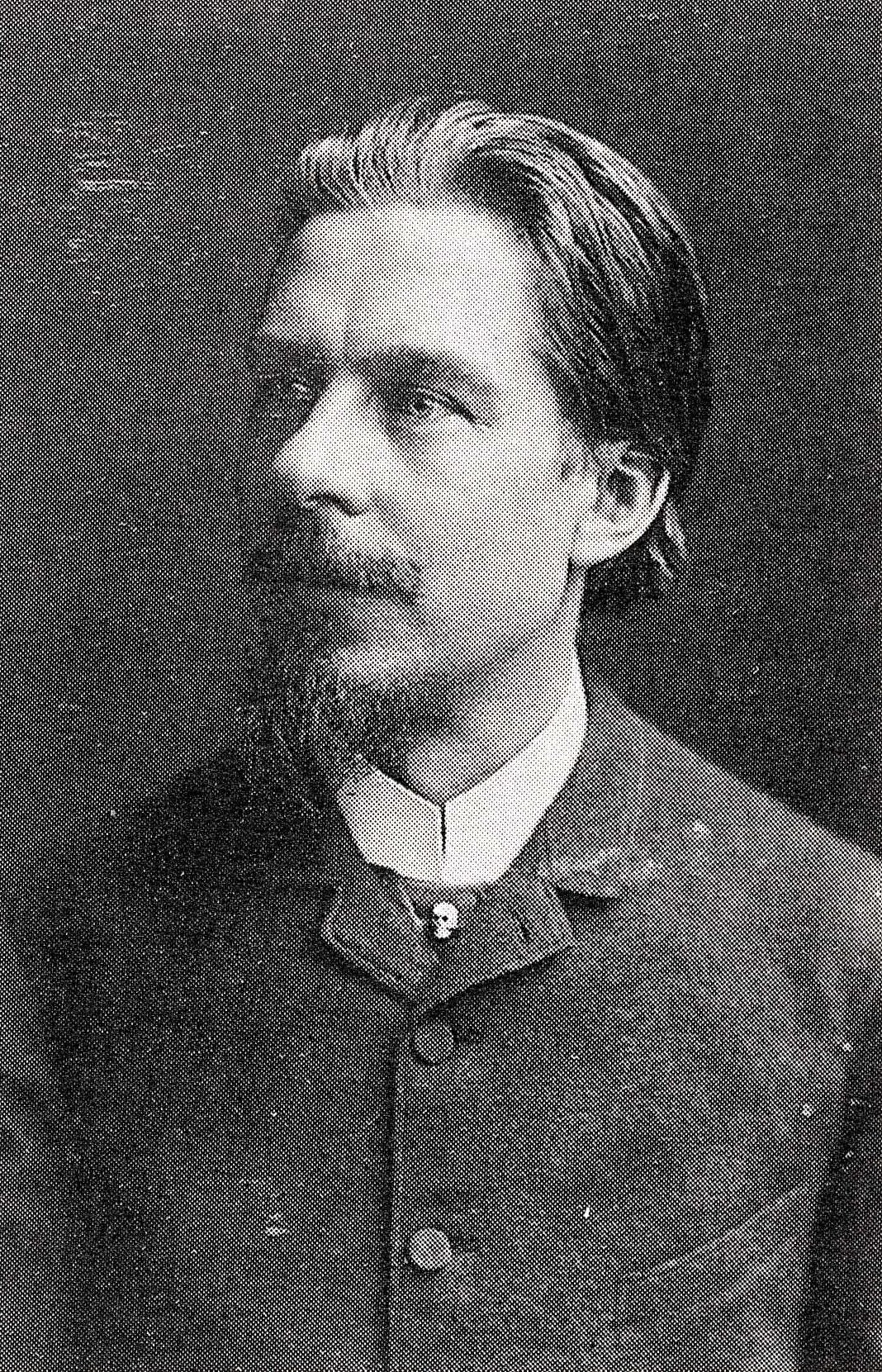
Mela, c. 1870

Aukusti Juhana Mela born August Johan Malmberg (8 March 1846 – 3 February 1904) was a Finnish naturalist and teacher. He wrote several textbooks on zoology and natural history and was an influential figure in education in Finland.

Mela was born in Kuopio, the son of assessor Karl August Malmberg and Julie Schlüter. Mela became interested in nature in school thanks to the influence of the doctors Martin Johan Lindfors and Anders Edvin Nylander. Other influences included his contemporaries Zacharias Joachim Cleve and Mikael Runeberg, the national poet's son. He joined the University of Helsinki in 1865 and received a master's in philosophy in 1873 after which he became a teacher. In 1870 he travelled to the Kola peninsula along with fellow student Johan Reinhold Sahlberg. He became a senior teacher at the Finnish Normal Lyceum in 1888 and at the same time worked as an amanuens at the zoological museum under his friend J. A. Palmén. He was the only teacher of natural history at schools in his time and wrote several textbooks including one on botany in 1877 and another on zoology in 1899. He encouraged the translations of other works into Finnish. He also wrote a book on the vertebrate fauna of Finland in 1872 which went through several editions. He gave lectures on Darwinism and edited the satire magazines Pilkkakirves and Matti Meikäläinen which often attacked the church. He Finnicized his name from the Swedish form in 1876.

Mela collected fossils and specimens which he donated to the Kuopion lunnoon ystäväin yshystys (Kuopio nature lovers' association). He was an active member of the Societas pro Fauna et Flora Fennica.
