= Kaarlo Eemeli Kivirikko =

Finnish zoologist, school teacher and writer (1870–1947)

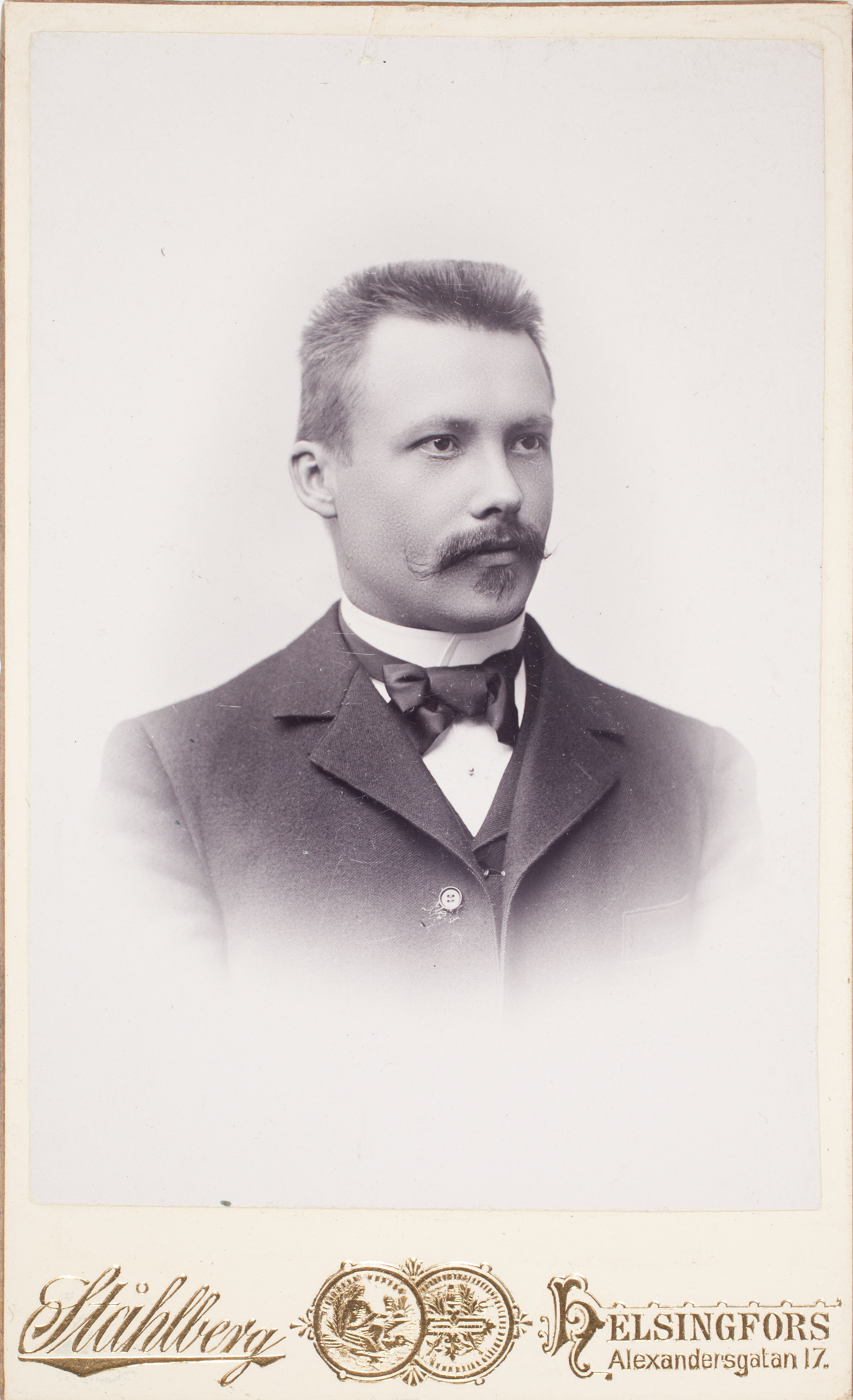

Kaarlo Eemeli Kivirikko (born Karl Emil Stenroos; January 28, 1870 – April 26, 1947) was a Finnish zoologist, school teacher and writer of non-fiction. He collected bird specimens on travels to eastern Europe and his specimens are now held at the University of Helsinki.

Stenroos was born to builder August and Agatha Charlotta Corzard. He matriculated in 1889 from the Normal Lycaeum where he was influenced by Aukusti Juhana Mela to study natural history. The family spent summers in Nurmijärvi where he observed birds. He received a bachelor's degree in 1892. He made research trips to the trips to White Karelia in 1894 and to Transcaspia, Turkestan and Siberia in 1896. He received a doctorate in 1898 for his study of the limnology of Nurmijärvi-See. He taught natural history and geography at the Sortavala Real Lyceum and at the Sortavala Seminary from 1899 to 1905. After his marriage in 1906 he changed his surname to Kivirikko. He became a senior lecturer of natural history and geography at the Finnish Normal Lyceum from 1905. He became a head teacher in 1911 and worked until his retirement in 1938. He studied birds in his spare time and was a president of the Finnish ornithological association between 1926 and 1936. He wrote a two volume book on the birds of Finland (Suomen linnut) in 1926–1927.
