= Caterina Ginnasi =

Italian artist (1590–1660)

- Born: 1590; Rome
- Died: 30 November 1660 (aged 69–70); Rome
- Known for: Painting
- Movement: Baroque

Caterina Ginnasi (1590 – 30 November 1660) was an Italian noblewoman and painter of the Baroque period, active mainly in Rome.

Ginnasi was orphaned under a young age, and placed in the care of her uncle, Cardinal Domenico Ginnasi, who was the dean of the Holy College in Rome. He had arranged for her to marry a cousin, but she refused to consent and chose instead to remain single and dedicate herself to a spiritual and devotional life. Although she never became a nun she lived like one and was close friends with other Roman noblewomen nuns. When her talent was recognised, she started training under the painter Gaspare Celio, and then under Giovanni Lanfranco until 1634. Lanfranco had painted a Pentecost scene in oil on the ceiling of the gallery for Cardinal Ginnasi in the Palazzo Ginnasi between 1629 and 1632.

== Career as an artist ==
Caterina was the only woman included in Giovanni Battista Passeri's biography of contemporary artists and was one of a few women to become a member of the Accademia di San Luca. Passeri praised Caterina for her dedication to studying drawing and painting, rather than the usual women's pastimes of sewing. Her uncle Cardinal Ginnasi appreciated and encouraged her work; he displayed four of her paintings amongst works by Titian and Guido Reni in his gallery: a St Catherine with the wheel; an Assumption of the Virgin; St Michael Archangel and a Virgin with Velletri's protector saints. He also asked her to paint altarpieces for the church of Santa Lucia alle Botteghe Oscure in Rome and for his chapel in the cathedral of Velletri (now lost).

Caterina's success in Rome was due to these religious altarpieces. The majority of her works were completed for the church of Santa Lucia alle Botteghe Oscure that had been rebuilt in 1630 under her uncle's patronage; the church was destroyed in 1936, her altarpiece of the martyrdom of Saint Lucy and a lunette of the Last Supper (cut down from an altarpiece) are visible in a surviving photograph of the church; the altarpiece and lunette are now in the chapel and sacristy of the present Palazzo Ginnasi. The Saint Lucy altarpiece was designed by Lanfranco. Caterina also painted a small oval of the Virgin for this church, as well as an altarpiece of Saint Blaise healing a boy, whose face is said to be modelled on Cardinal Ginnasi.

For the chapel in Velletri, Caterina painted a large altarpiece of the Virgin and Velletri's Four Protector Saints; two side paintings of saints; four corner Evangelists and the chapel's dome; these have been destroyed or repainted. She also painted the main altarpiece for the church of SS. dell'Angeli Custodi (demolished in 1928-1929 for the Via del Tritone) depicting a guardian angel leading a boy to Paradise away from Hell (now lost). A painting of Saint Joseph (untraced) was also recorded in Rome in 1925. A Nativity and Pieta were also recorded in an 18th-century collection. A portrait of Cardinal Ginnasi in the Podestà-Lucciardi Collection, Sarzana, has been attributed to Caterina; along with an oval version previously in the Castel Bolognese.

== Patronage ==
In 1637, Caterina persuaded her uncle Cardinal Ginnasi to found a convent of Discalced Carmelite nuns of the Corpus Domini which was built inside the family palace, Palazzo Ginnasi, and attached to the church of Santa Lucia alle Botteghe Oscure. The convent was run by Caterina and her mother, Faustina Gottardi. Caterina owned many religious images, particularly of Saint Catherine, relics, statuettes and wax images as well as objects believed to be magical. At his death in 1639, her uncle left her a large dowry which she invested and doubled in worth. She commissioned a tomb for her uncle from Giuliano Finelli.

== Legacy ==
Like her family, Caterina was interred in the church of S Lucia; however, in 1938 this church and convent were torn down during enlargement of the Via delle Botteghe Oscure. The Baroque funerary monuments of the family were transferred to a modern chapel inside the modern rebuilt Palazzo Ginassi. Caterina's inscription is translated as:

Caterina Ginnasi, nephew of Cardinal Ginnasi, because of her fruitful virtue, mother of the poor and married yet barren. She did not use the money on earth to purchase the profits from Heaven, but proferred it in charity towards all. In furnishings, in victuals, in lodging: in all, she only sought suffering for herself; and to live after death, she lived as if her residence were but a tomb. In the early morning in winter while attending the sacred functions, spurred by the heat of her divine love, she contracted a cold, and for this, she died, but her charity will never die.
