= Luigi Primo =

Italian painter (c. 1605–1667)

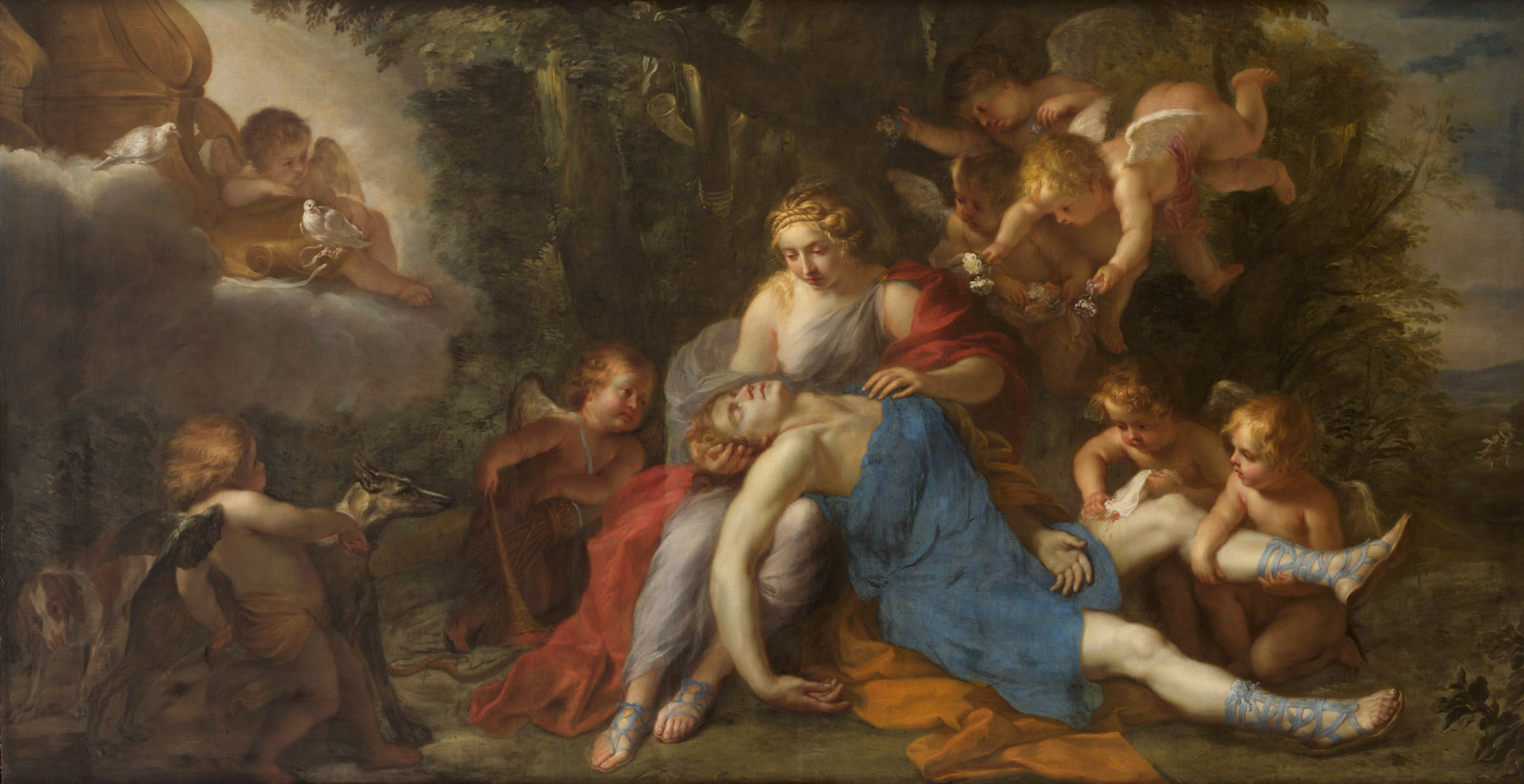
Venus Lamenting the Death of Adonis

Louis Cousin, in Italy mainly known as Luigi Primo or Luigi Gentile (c. 1605–1667) was a Flemish painter of the Baroque period, who was active in Italy for a major part of his career. Working in a style, which combined his Flemish roots with the profound influence of Italian art, he was known for his portraits and altarpieces.

== Life ==
His birthplace was probably the village Breivelde near Ninove in present-day Belgium but it is also possible that he was born in Brussels. A birth before 1606 is also considered possible. He was apprenticed to Gillis Claeissins the younger in Brussels in 1617. He left the southern Netherlands while still young. According to the 17th-century biographer Joachim von Sandrart Cousin continued his studies in Paris.

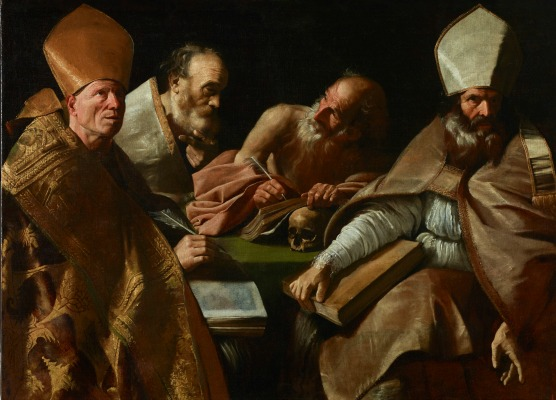
The four Doctors of the Church, Royal Palace of Madrid

He was in Rome as early as 1626. Here he would remain for thirty years. He joined the Bentvueghels, the informal association of mainly Dutch and Flemish painters resident in Rome. In the Bentvueghels he was given the nickname Gentile or Gentiel on account of his gentle manners. He was in Rome commonly known by his nickname Gentile. He used also in Italy the surname 'Primo' which is a translation into Italian of his surname which in French means 'cousin'.

In Rome he studied the works of the great masters. The first work in Rome that brought him some fame was a fresco on the side altar of the Santi Domenico e Sisto church in Rome. It depicts a miracle attributed to Dominic Guzman. Then he painted one of four oil paintings in the Saint Catherine chapel in the Basilica di Santa Maria Maggiore. This work increased his reputation and earned him new, well-paid commissions.

In 1635 he joined the confraternity of the Church of St. Julian of the Flemings, signing with 'Ludovicus Cousin, alias Primo, alias Gentile'. He was further inducted into the Accademia di San Luca in 1650 and even became its director from 1651 to 1652. The admission criteria of the Accademia were very strict and considered both the artistic merit and personal qualities of the candidate. The selection process consisted of two rounds of voting in order to ensure that only the most eminent artists were selected and the prestige of the Accademia would be preserved.

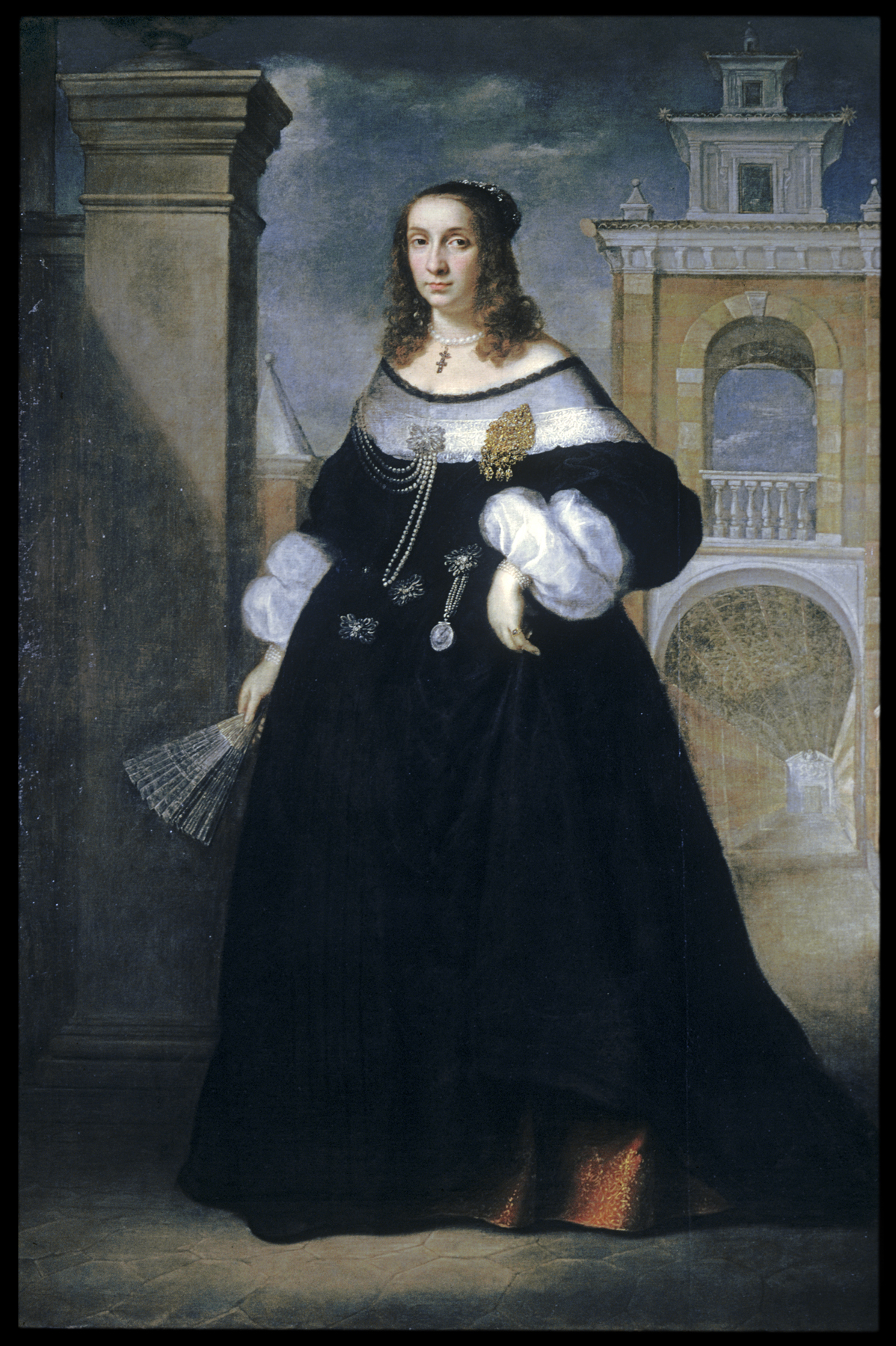
Portrait of a Noblewoman of Ancona (1650–1660)

The seventeenth-century Italian biographer Giovanni Battista Passeri wrote that Cousin's passion for women induced him to neglect his work and squander all his money. Cousin decided to leave Rome. He traveled to Loreto, where he made a painting for the high altar of the church of Santa Margherita, and then to Pesaro, where he worked in the cathedral. Finally he moved to Venice, where he painted several portraits.

He returned to Rome a few years before the death of Pope Innocent X in 1655. He was the first artist who painted a portrait of his successor Alexander VII following his election.

After spending more than thirty years in Rome, he returned to Brussels. He became a member of the local Guild of Saint Luke in 1661. He continued to paint portraits and historical themes, and also made designs (cartons) for tapestries that were then manufactured by local weavers. Through his involvement in the manufacture of tapestries, he was exempt from taxes.

His work was popular with the Habsburg princes from whom he received numerous commissions. For the Spanish king he made a few cartons for tapestries and a large painting entitled Venus Lamenting the Death of Adonis (around 1656–1557). He painted a number of paintings for Archduke Leopold Wilhelm of Austria and made for the Austrian emperor some portraits of the emperor.

According to Passeri he left little money after his death because he was fond of entertainment and thus liberally spent the money he earned.

He had a number of students, including Jan van Cleef.

== Work ==
Louis Cousin painted mythological subjects and religious works and was also very appreciated as a portrait painter. The style of Cousin is situated halfway between the Italian and Flemish traditions and is a typical example of the lofty, somewhat tediously decorative style of the High Baroque.

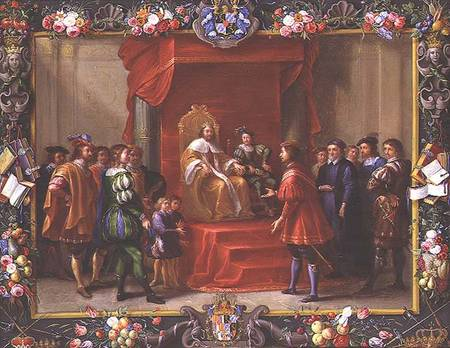
Guillermo Ramón Moncada visiting the King of Aragon possibly Charles

Some of the altarpieces he painted between 1633 and 1657 for churches in Rome are still in situ (e.g. Virgin Presenting the Child to St Anthony of Padua, 1655, San Marco, Rome).

According to some sources say Cousin painted between 1646 and 1652 27 small devotional paintings on copper for Pope Innocent X. The small panels that were greatly admired by his contemporaries are, however, lost. He collaborated on a series of twenty copper panels that narrate the deeds of two Sicilian noble brothers of Spanish origin, Guillermo Ramón Moncada and Antonio Moncada. Of twelve scenes devoted to the former, Luigi Primo painted five, Willem van Herp six and Adam Frans van der Meulen one. Jan van Kessel the Elder, an artist specialised in still lifes with flowers, insects and animals, executed the decorative borders that frame the various episodes.
