= Gijsbrecht Leytens =

17th-Century Flemish painter

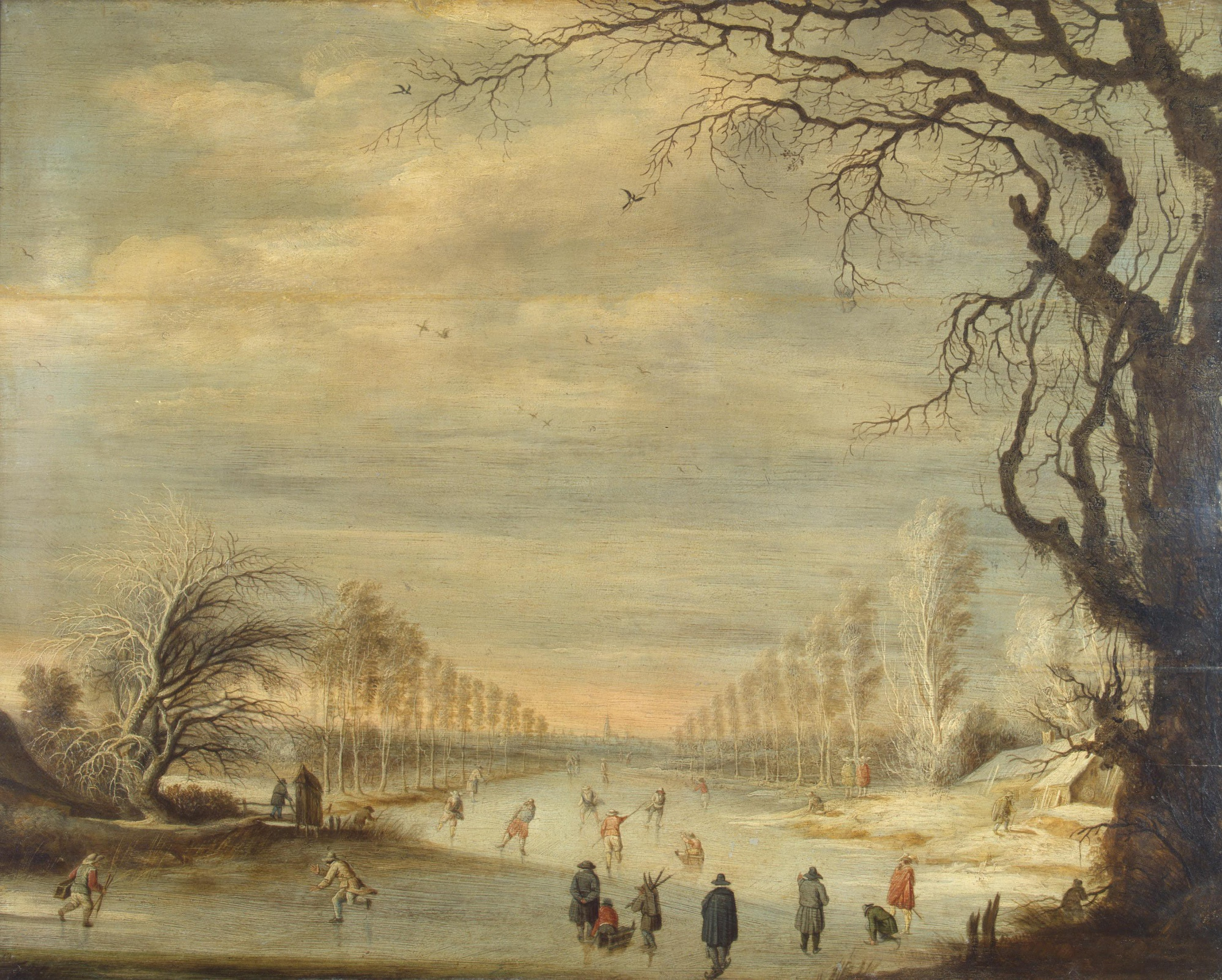
Winter landscape

Gijsbrecht Leytens, formerly known as Meester van de Winterlandschappen or Master of the Winter Landscapes, (1586– after 1643 and before 1656) was a Flemish painter who specialized in landscapes and in particular winter landscapes.

== Life ==
He was born in Antwerp. He became a pupil of Jacob Vrolijck in 1598. He joined the Antwerp Guild of Saint Luke as a master in 1611. He married Maria van Omel.

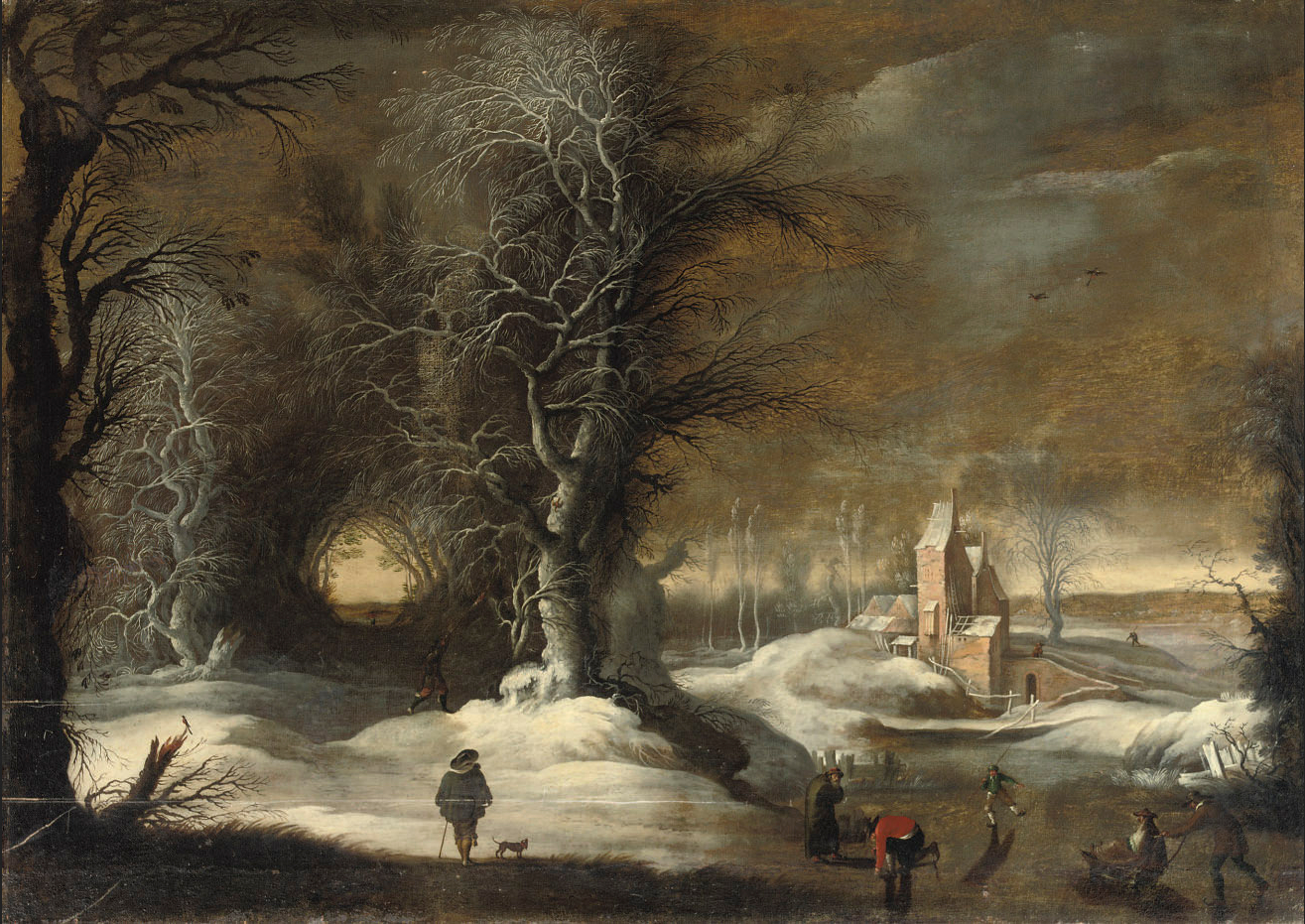
Winter landscape with figures sleighing and skating

There was a lot of demand for the winter landscapes painted by Leytens as is confirmed by the fact that they were often incorporated in the art gallery paintings of Frans Francken the Younger. Between 1617 en 1627 he had a number of pupils demonstrating an active workshop.

Since there is a record showing he was alive in 1643 while in 1657 he is recorded as 'the late' he must have died between those years.

He was the teacher of Jan Baptist Rocataillate and Francois Veeken.

== Work ==
Leytens' work was originally attributed to an unidentified painter referred to as 'Meester van de Winterlandschappen' or 'Master of the Winter Landscapes'. Only in 1942 F.J.J. Reelick tentatively identified Gijsbrecht Leytens with this anonymous master. This attribution was confirmed in 1988 by Ursula Härtung on the basis of a fully signed work.

Leytens painted mainly landscapes. All known landscapes by him are winter landscapes except for a few such as A mountainous landscape with deer (Herzog Anton Ulrich Museum, Braunschweig) and a Wooded Mountain Landscape with Waterfall and Travellers (Nationalmuseum, Stockholm). It is known that he painted six marine paintings but these are now lost.

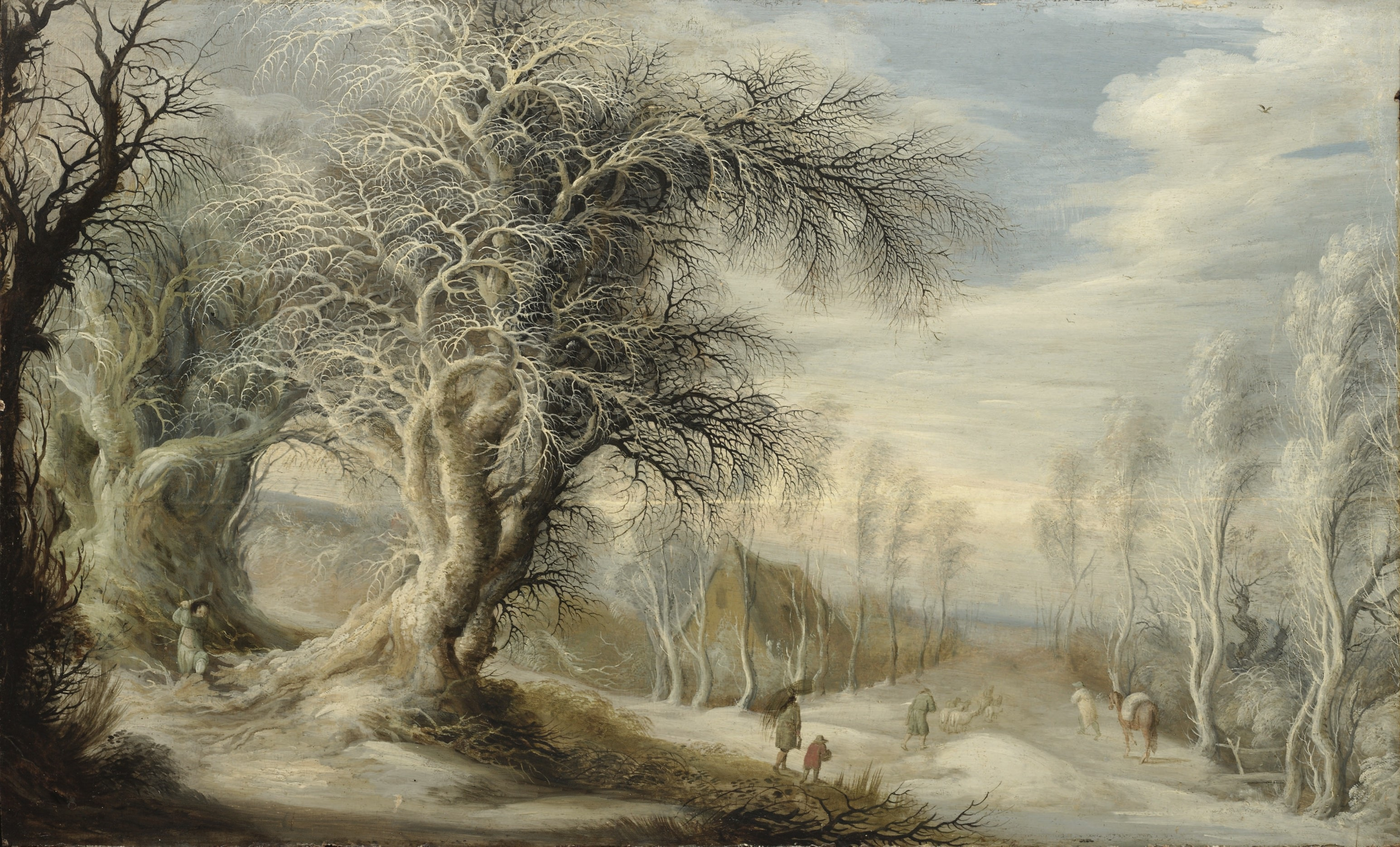
Winter landscape with a woodsman and travelers

Artists such as Pieter Bruegel the Elder and Abel Grimmer, as well as Denis van Alsloot and Daniel van Heil, had turned the winter landscape into one of the preferred subjects of Flemish painting. The theme was taken up by Dutch painters such as Hendrick Avercamp, Aert van der Neer and Anthonie Verstraelen. Gijsbrecht Leytens' work is unique in distancing itself from the austere, dreary and unsettling landscapes that rely on human figures to come to life. Leytens succeeded in recreating winter while avoiding a simple academic rendering showing the trivial details of human activities. His winter landscapes shimmer in the light of sunny mornings. Leytens is regarded as the 'poet of the frost', since he succeeds in expressing the poetic beauty of winter by devices such as depicting the naked sun on a countryside caught in the ice. He stands out through the refinement of his subtle colour harmonies.

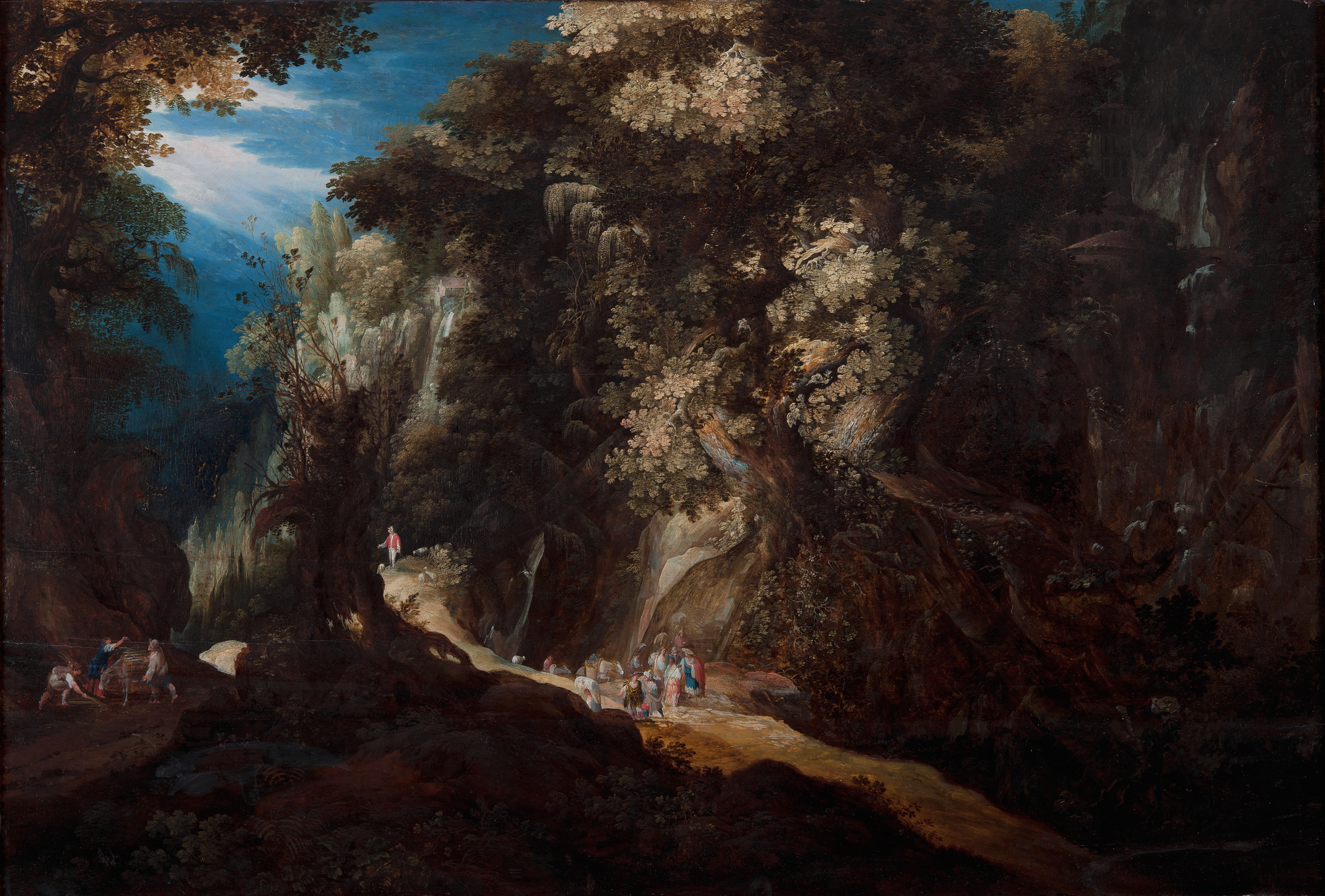
Wooded mountain landscape with waterfall and travellers

Gijsbrecht Leytens was influenced by Jan Brueghel the Elder and Gillis van Coninxloo. Like his contemporaries in Antwerp, Abraham Govaerts and Alexander Keirincx, Leytens painted wooded landscapes populated with small figures, bracketed by strong repoussoir trees.

As was common in Antwerp artist circles in the 17th century Gijsbrecht Leytens regularly collaborated with other painters who were specialists in a particular genre. Inventories of the 17th century provide evidence for collaborations between Leytens and artists such as Frans Francken the Younger, Sebastiaen Vrancx and Vincent Malo, who would paint the figures while Leytens painted the landscapes. Often Leytens reused his landscape designs and let his collaborators add different figures to them thus creating a different theme. This points to serial work in his workshop due to the great demand for his work.
