= Isaac Wigans =

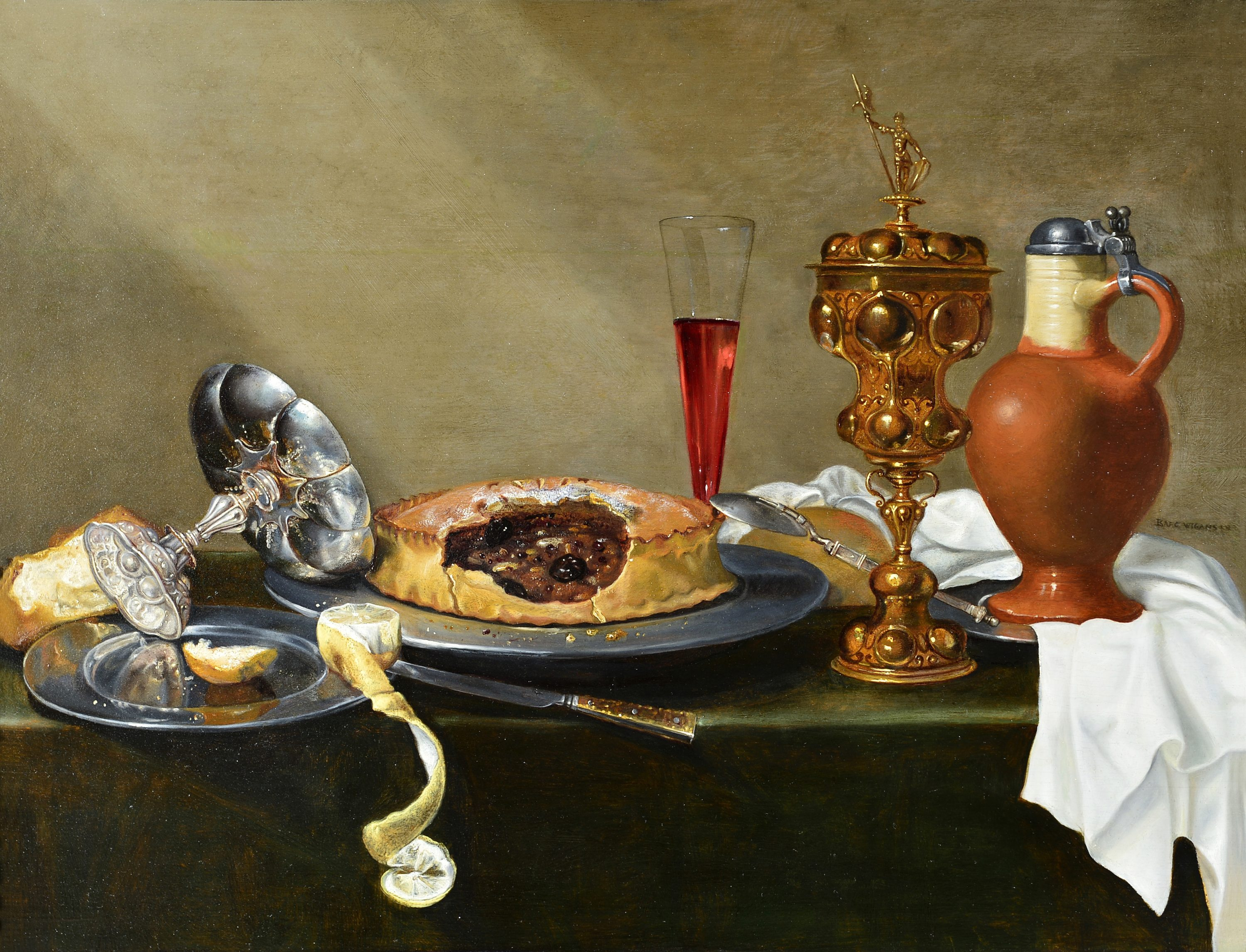
Still life on a draped table

Isaac Wigans (Antwerp, 1615 – Antwerp, c. 1663) was a Flemish still life painter active in Antwerp. He is known for his fruit still lifes and banquet-style still lifes. He may also have been active as a copyist or imitator of monochrome banquet still lifes in the style of contemporary Dutch artists in The Hague.

== Life ==
Little is known about the life of the artist. He was born as the son of Mattheus (Matthys) Wigans (died on 13 May 1661) and his first wife Adriana Langeryt (died in 1615) in Antwerp where he was baptized on 11 June 1615 in the St. Walburga Church. His father was a registered member of the Antwerp Guild of Saint Luke in the capacity of dealer in paintings.

Still life of silverware, a dead fish, a watch and a glass on a draped table

Isaac trained with the Flemish history painter Vincent Malo. He was registered as a pupil of Malo at the Antwerp Guild of Saint Luke in the guild year 1631–1632. It is not clear whether he is identical with the Isac Wigans who was registered at the Antwerp Guild as a master in 1651 as the son of an existing member (a 'wijnmeester'). This may have been a younger member from his family.

The artist was active in Antwerp until his death in the year 1662 or 1663.

== Work ==
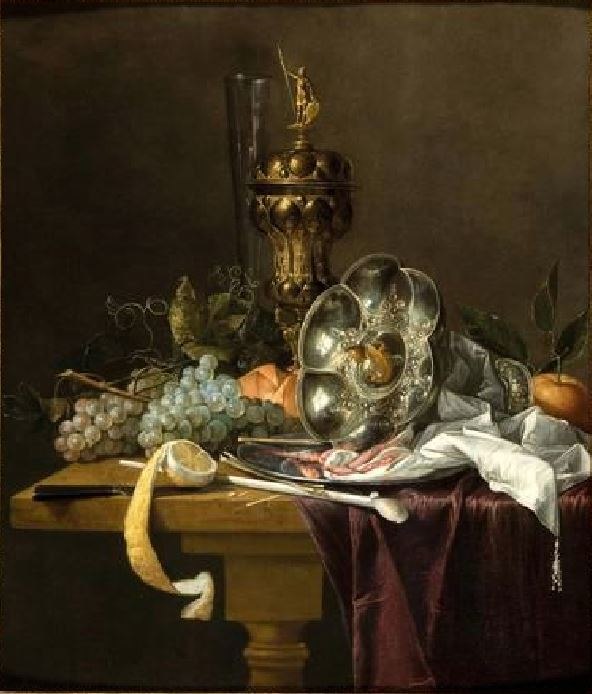
Still life of silverware and fruit

Only three signed works by the artist are known. Isaac Wigans was a still life specialist who is known for his fruit still lifes and banquet style-still lifes. He is also believed to have painted monochrome banquet still lifes in the style of contemporary Dutch artists active in The Hague such as Pieter Claesz and Willem Claesz Heda. There is no unanimity among art historians on the attribution of certain works to the artist.
