= Emmanuel Adriaenssen =

Flemish lute player and composer

Emmanuel Adriaenssen (also Adriaensen, Adriansen, Hadrianus, Hadrianius; c. 1554 in Antwerp – buried 27 February 1604 in Antwerp) was a Flemish lutenist, composer and master of music. He authored the influential Pratum Musicum, which contains scores for lute solos, and more importantly settings of madrigals for multiple lutes and different ensembles involving lutes and voices. He also had an important influence on the next generation of lutenists through his activity as a teacher of music in his own music school.

== Life ==
Emmanuel Adriaenssen was born in Antwerp between 1540 and 1555. Little is known about his early life and training. It is known that he travelled to Rome in 1574 to study music. Upon his return to Antwerp he started a lute school with his brother Gysbrecht. The brothers had in 1587 a conflict with the musicians' guild of Antwerp because they practised as musicians without becoming members of the guild. Emanuel later became a master of the guild.

He married Sybilla Crelin in 1584 with whom he had six sons and one daughter. Their sons Alexander (1587–1661), Vincent (1595–1675) and Niclaes (1598–1658) became respectively a still life painter, a battle painter and a portrait painter. Prior to the Fall of Antwerp, Emmanuel was likely a Calvinist as he only had his first son baptised in a Catholic after the Fall of Antwerp. He was registered as a Catholic in the purge records of the Antwerp civic guard after the Fall of Antwerp. His wealth and good connections with the higher circles of Antwerp society may have protected him. Emmanuel was later appointed captain of the civic guard, an activity providing a regular income. In 1595 he took part in the liberation of the neighboring town of Lier, which had been occupied by troops of the Dutch Republic.

Adriaenssen became a well-off burgher who frequented the local notables including probably from the nobility, who valued his virtuosity on the lute. He gained an international reputation thanks to his publications of lute music which found their way into the libraries of illustrious people, such as Philips of Marnix, Lord of Saint-Aldegonde, Constantijn Huygens, King John IV of Portugal and Cardinal Mazarin. Composers Adrian Denss (1594), Robert Dowland (1610), Georg Leopold Fuhrmann (1615), Jean-Baptiste Besard (1617), Wolfgang Printz (1690) and Ernst Gottlieb Baron (1727) mention him as a leading composer for lute. As a teacher, he played an important role because of the outstanding tablatures that he published and because he was the initiator of an Antwerp lute school whose pupils included, in all likelihood, Denss and Joachim van den Hove.

Emmanuel Adriaenssen died in Antwerp between 2 February 1604, the date on which he made his last will, and 27 February 1604, the date of is funeral and burial in the St. James' Church, Antwerp. His wife remarried and emigrated later to Leiden in the Dutch Republic taking her youngest son Niclaes with her.

== Works ==
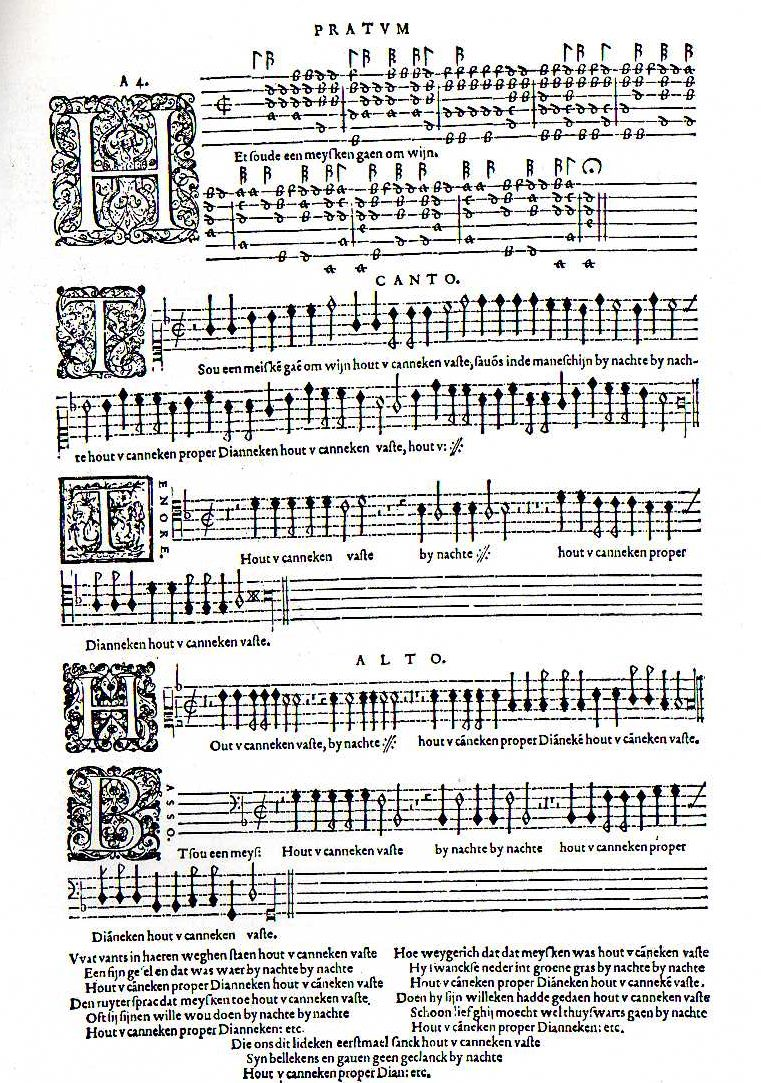
Page (f. 59v) of the Pratum Musicum

The Pratum Musicum was first published in Antwerp in 1584 and was reprinted with alterations several times until 1600. They constitute 3 editions:

- Pratum musicum longe amoenissimum, cuius ... ambitu comprehenduntur ... omnia ad testudinis tabulaturam fideliter redacta... opus novum (Antwerp, Petrus Phalesius the Younger 1584), reprinted in 1600; and
- Novum pratum musicum... selectissimi diversorum autorum et idiomatum madrigales, cantiones, et moduli... opus plane novum, nec hactenus editum (Antwerp, Petrus Phalesius the Younger and Johannes Bellerus, 1592).

The Pratum Musicum contains lute solos, and more importantly settings of madrigals for multiple lutes and different ensembles involving lutes and voices giving much study material for the researcher into renaissance performance practice. The book contains around 85 tablatures for fantasias, songs and dances. Most of the vocal pieces are in Italian. The Neapolitan songs, with their parallel fifths (which not required in Italian text, so it is a question here of a style marker) have a more rustic character. One of them, Del crud’amor, has an almost Oriental character. Various dances for solo lute also tend toward the rustic.

The ensemble pieces have been recorded by the Dowland Consort of Lutes and by the Liuto Concertato.
