= Alexander Adriaenssen =

Flemish Baroque painter (1587–1661)

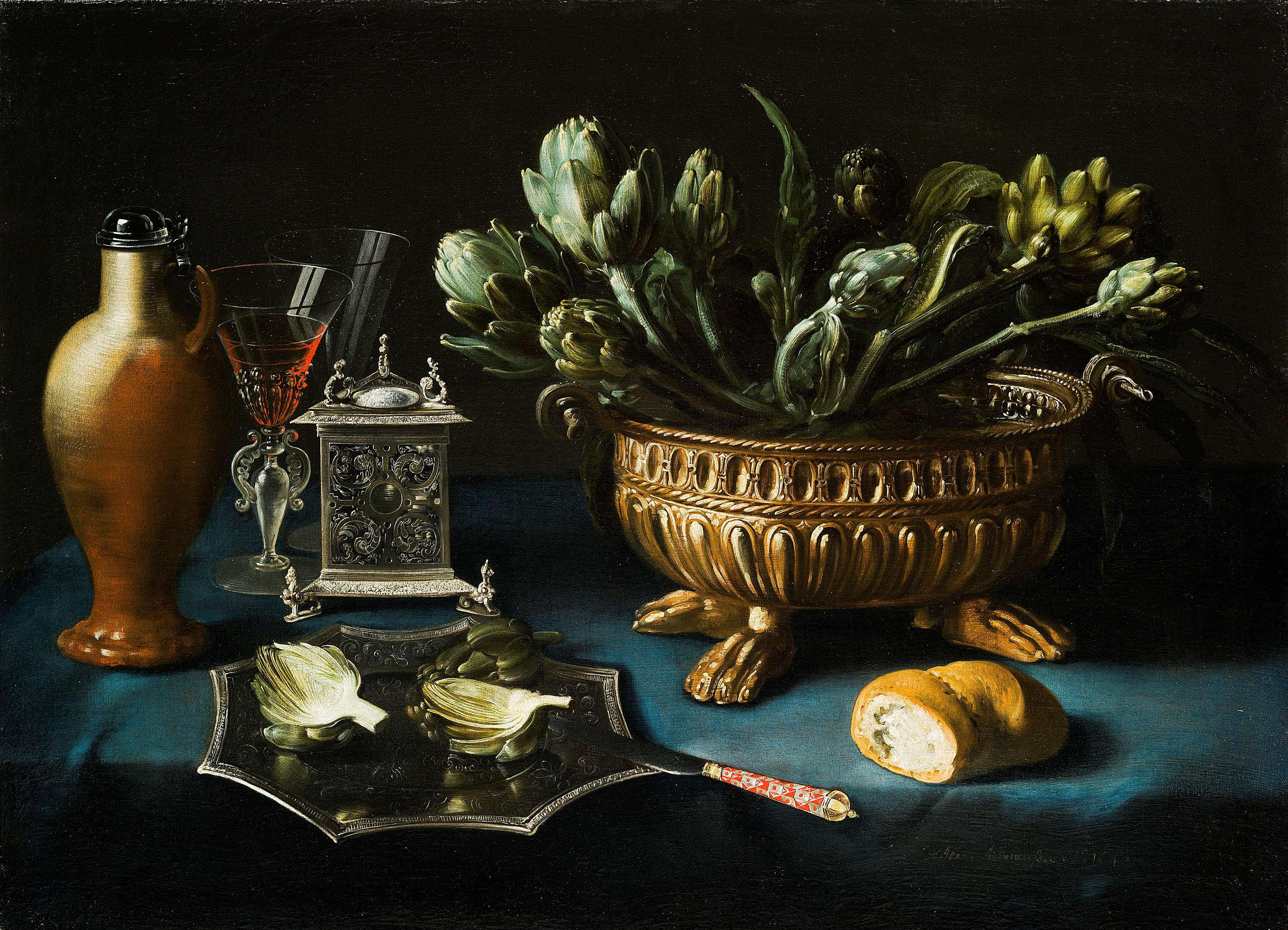
Still life with artichokes in a silver gilt wine cistern and other silver objects

Alexander Adriaenssen (1587–1661) was a Flemish Baroque painter, particularly known for his still-lifes of fish and game pieces. He also painted banquet pieces with food and flower still lifes.

== Life ==
Alexander Adriaenssen was born in Antwerp, the son of the famous Antwerp composer and lute player Emmanuel Adriaenssen and Sibilla Crelin. He was baptised on 17 January 1587 in the St. James' Church, Antwerp. His younger brother Vincent became a battle painter. Another younger brother called Niclaes became a portrait painter and would in 1612 emigrate with his widowed mother to Haarlem.

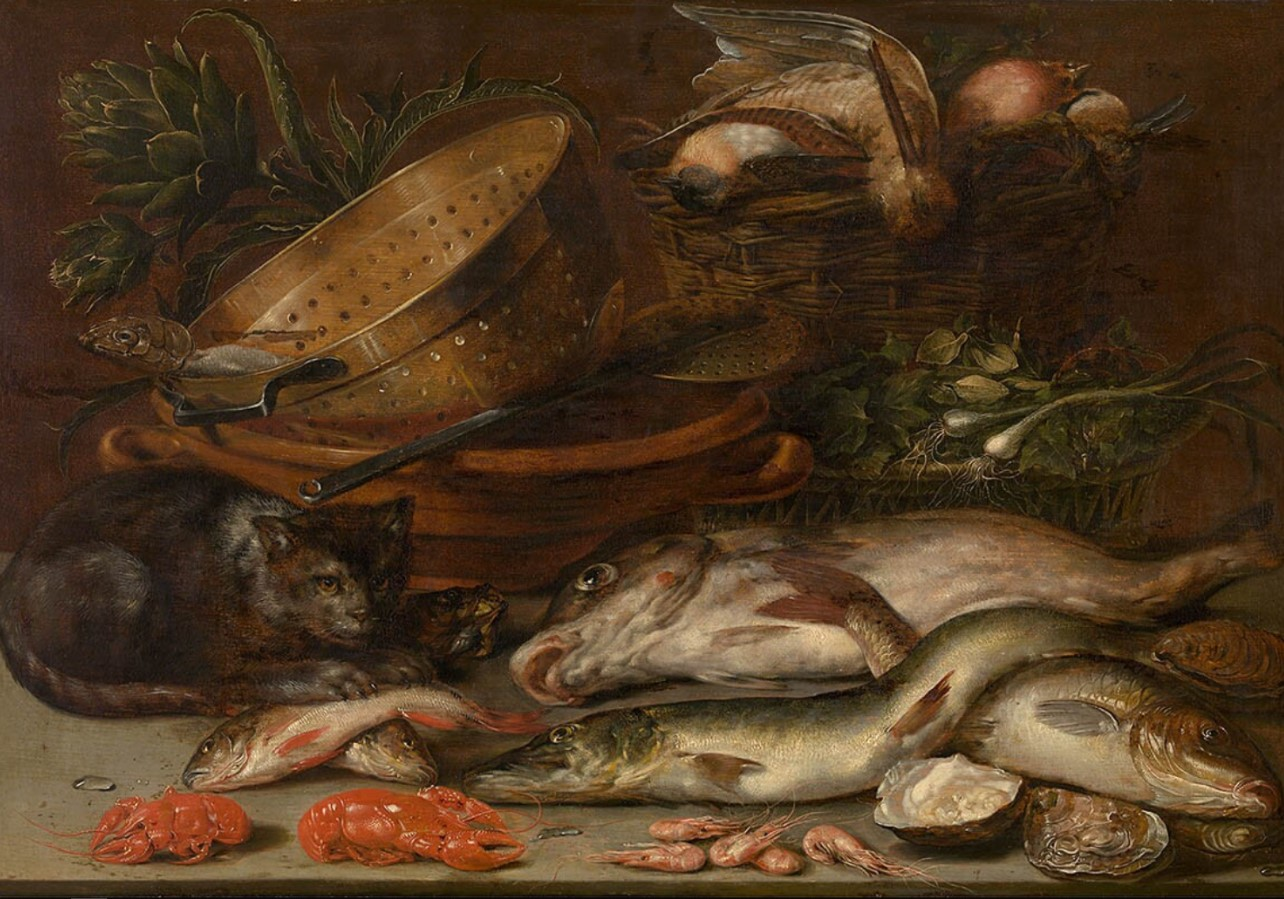
Fruits, dead birds and fish, touched by a cat

Alexander was registered as the pupil of Artus van Laeck in 1597. In 1610 he became a master of the Guild of St. Luke of Antwerp. As he had trained particularly in the art of painting coats of arms on parchment, he was registered as a water colour painter. He soon became skilled in painting with oil and specialized in still lifes. He was able to build his reputation with these works. Rubens was an admirer and bought two of Adriaenssen's works for his collection. Anthony van Dyck also appreciated the artist's output and painted his portrait, which was engraved by Antony van der Does.

The artist married Maria Seeldraeyers on 2 February 1611. The couple had 6 children. The battle painter Peter Snayers was the godfather of one and Isabella Brandt, Rubens' first wife, the godmother of another. When his brother Niclaes returned from Holland in 1616 he took up residence with Alexander.

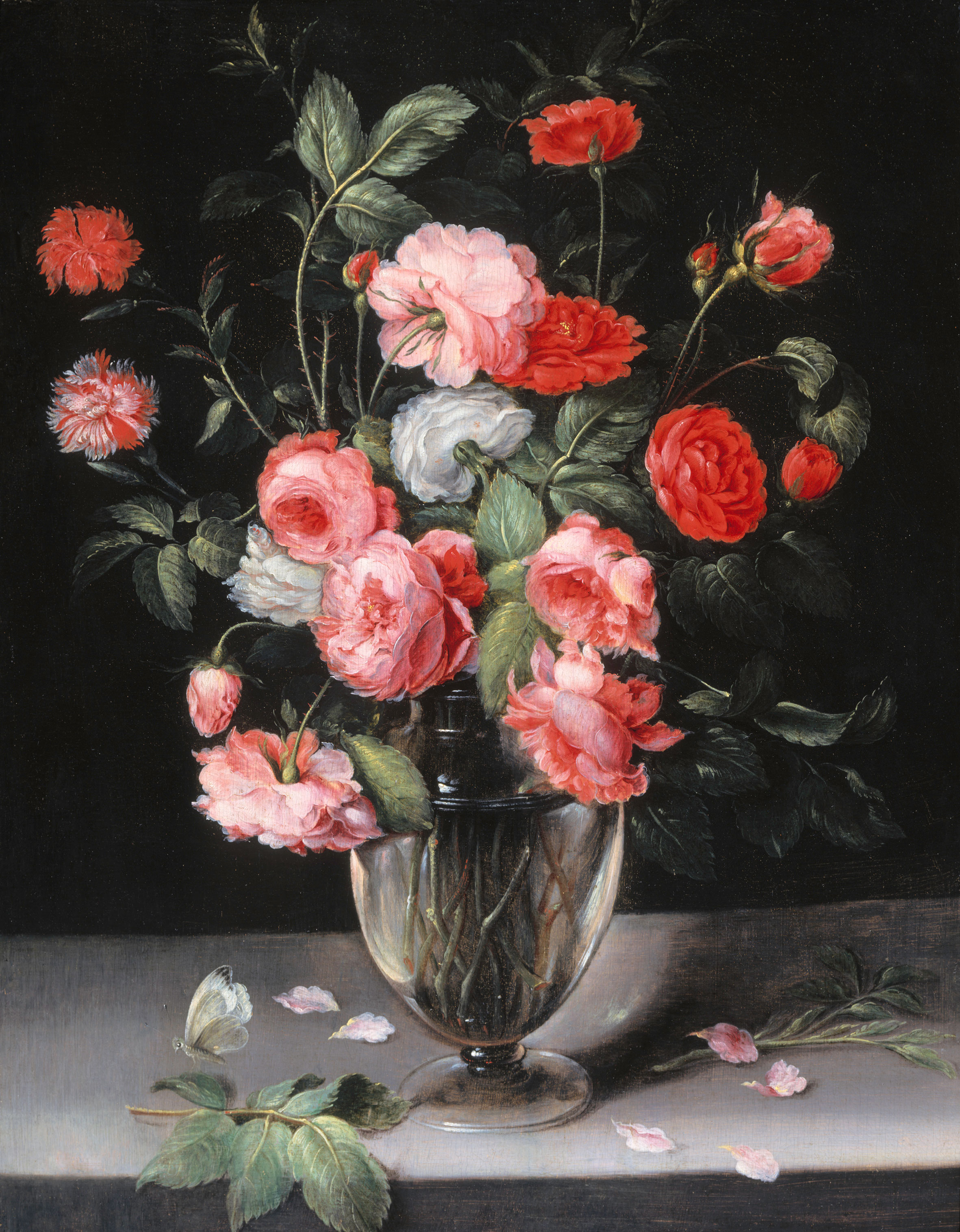
Still life with flowers in a glass vase, 1630s

In 1632 Philips Milcx became his pupil. Adriaenssen was one of the artists working on the decorations for the Joyous Entry into Antwerp of the new governor of the Habsburg Netherlands Cardinal-Infante Ferdinand in 1635. Rubens was in overall charge of this project. For this project, Adriaenssen painted the coats of arms of the 17 provinces on the triumphal arches in honour of the new governor.

Adriaenssen paid his dues of the Guild of St. Luke each year until 1633. He lived in Antwerp's centre on De Wapper, near Rubens. He died in his house in 1661 and was buried on 30 October 1661 in the St. James' Church, Antwerp.

== Work ==
Alexander Adriaenssen was known for his still lifes of fruit and fish. He also painted game pieces and four flower pieces. Flower pieces regularly appear in his banquet style still lifes. Works by him survive with dates from 1623 to 1661, but the peak of his career was approximately 1630–1650. The signature "A. Neck" on one oil painting is probably a badly preserved instance of Adriaenssen's signature.

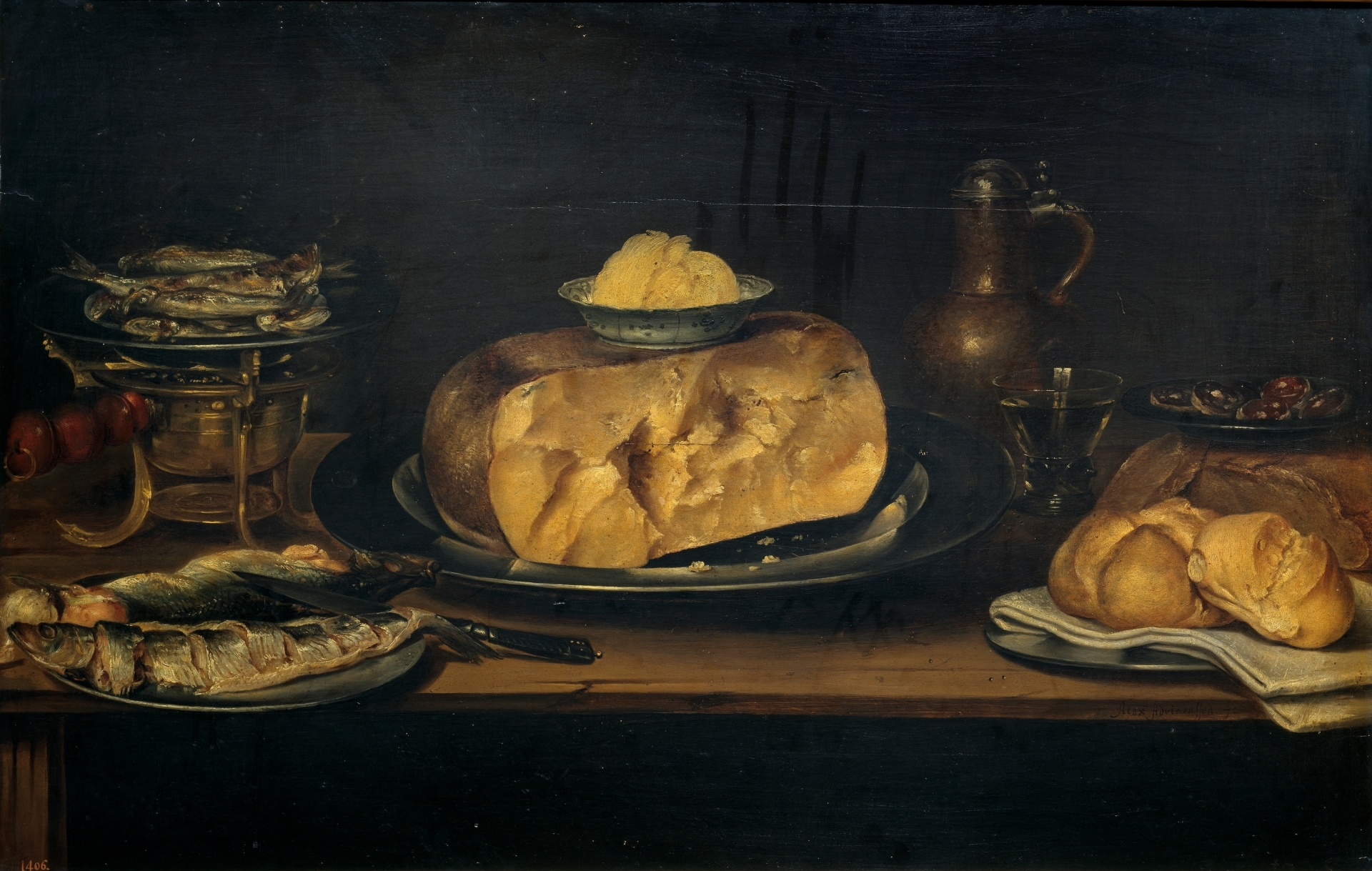
Still life of a table with crockery, cheese, sausage and fish

Alexander Adriaenssen was influenced in his still-life motifs by Frans Snyders and as a result his still lifes often included artichokes, poultry and live cats.

Alexander Adriaenssen also produced pronkstillevens (ostentatious still lifes) with expensive glasses and dishware. The subgenre of pronkstillevens was developed in Antwerp during the 1640s.

Adriaenssen is known particularly for his renderings of raw fish, a common topic of Dutch still-life painters which he portrayed in more than 60 works, more than any other artist in 17th-century Antwerp. Many of his fish still lifes were relatively small and inexpensive works.

Stylistically, he was influenced by the school of Haarlem. His compositions are characterised by an asymmetrical diagonal layout—a triangle standing on end flanked by ellipses—with objects overlapping over multiple planes for greater depth. He used a sober palette, which tended to the monochrome. An important feature of his work was also its purity of colour.
