= Anders Cleve =

Finland-Swedish writer (1937–1985)

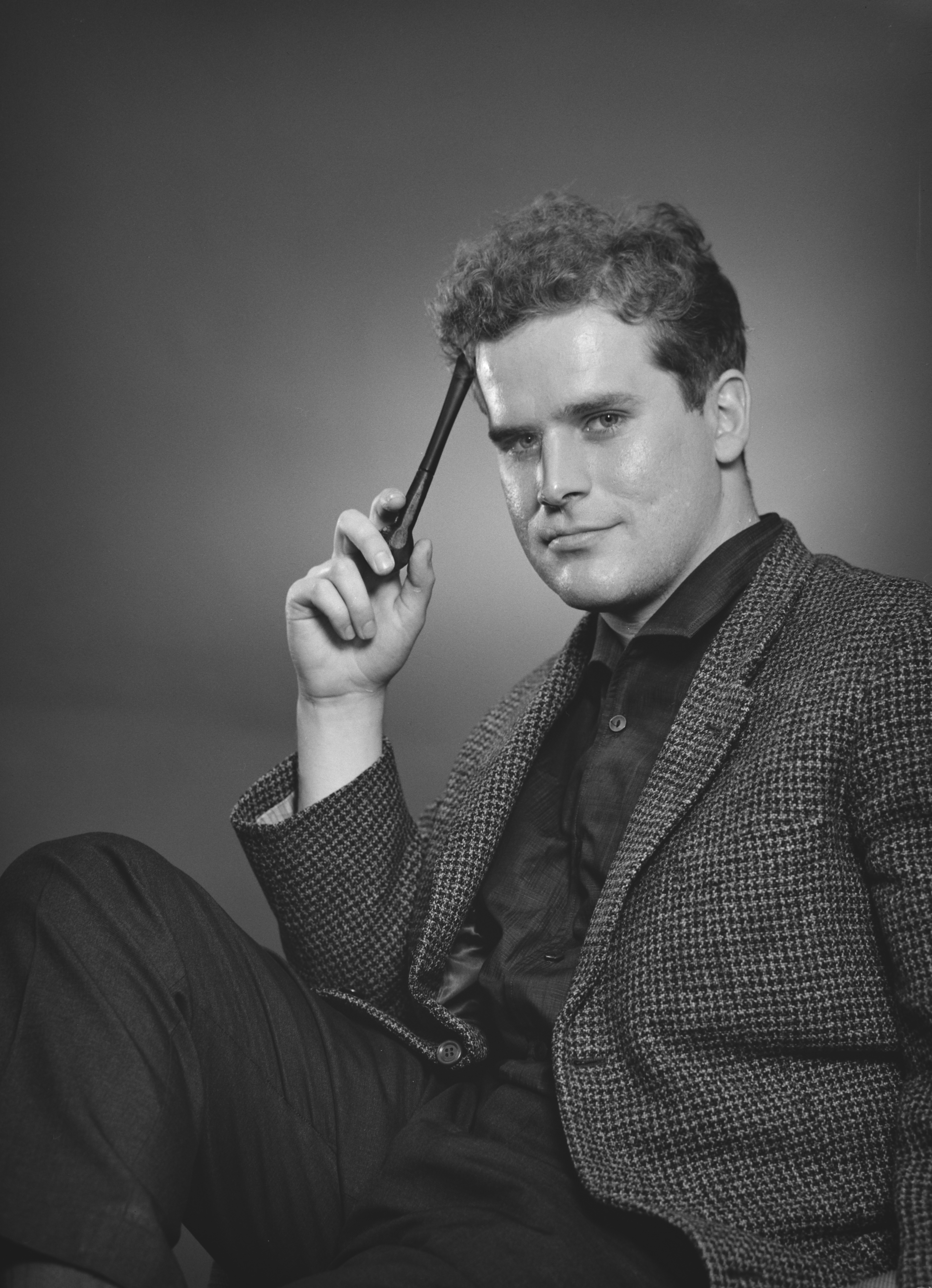
- Born: 25 July 1937; Helsinki, Finland
- Died: 26 March 1985 (aged 47); Helsinki, Finland
- Occupation: Writer
- Spouse: Gunilla Helena Slotte (m. 1961)

Anders Zachris Cleve (25 July 1937 – 26 March 1985) was a Finland-Swedish writer. He debuted as a poet with Dagen (1955).

Born in Helsinki, Cleve's parents were the priest Ola Uolevi Kalervo Cleve and Ruth Emilia Nyman. Cleve graduated from the Svenska normallyceum in Helsinki in 1955 and received his Bachelor of Arts degree from the University of Helsinki in 1974. In addition to his writing, he worked as a history teacher at, among others, Munksnäs svenska samskola (1960–1961) and Brändö svenska samskola (1965–1968) and was a lecturer at the Nya svenska samskolan 1971–1983. He married Gunilla Helena Slotte in 1961. Cleve died in Helsinki at the age of 47 in 1985.

Cleve's works often provide informed descriptions of the environment and testify to the author's optimism, vitality and linguistic independence. He received prizes from the Society of Swedish Literature in Finland in 1960, 1963 and 1967, the Längmanska kulturfondens Finland-prize in 1965, and the State Literature Prize (Finnish: Kirjallisuuden valtionpalkinto) and the Tollander-prize in 1967.

Cleve's best-known work is the short story collection Gatstenar (1959), in which he depicts working-class life in the capital Helsinki. Other well-known works are the contemporary trilogy Vit eld (1962), Påskägget (1966) and Labyrint (1971). Cleve also wrote the screenplay for the TV drama Ajolähtö (1969) and, in collaboration with Carl Mesterton, Kräkan (1969).

Anders Cleve was the nephew of archaeologist Nils Cleve.

== Bibliography ==
- Dagen. Söderström 1955
- Det bara ansiktet. Söderström 1956
- Gatstenar. Söderström 1959 (Finnish translation, Katukiviä, by Pentti Saarikoski, Otava 1960)
- Vit eld: En paradoxal saga. Söderström 1962
- Påskägget: En berättelse om vänskap. Bonnier, Stockholm 1966
- Labyrint. S. & Co, Helsingfors 1971
- Locknät. Söderström 1981
