= Giovanni Battista Passeri =

Italian painter

Giovanni Battista Passeri (c. 1610 – 22 April 1679) was an Italian painter of the Baroque period. He was a pupil of the painter Domenichino, as the latter worked at Frascati. He painted genre and still life paintings.

== Life ==
Born in Rome, Passeri is also known for his volume of artists' biographies, or Lives of the painters sculptors, and architects who practiced in Rome, and died between 1641 and 1673, published in 1773.

Passeri became director or president of the Accademia di San Luca in Rome, which once had his portrait of Domenichino, now in Florence. He was also the author of Il silenzio, discorso sopra la pittura (Rome, 1670) and La fantasia, discorso accademico (Rome, 1673). These publications are based on Passeri's lectures on art theory, which he delivered between 1662/3 and 1675 at the Accademia di S Luca. Another lecture remained unpublished.

He died in 1679. His nephew Giuseppe Passeri was a pupil of Carlo Maratta.

== Artists covered in Passeri's Vite de pittori, scultori ed architetti ==
- Guido Ubaldo Abatini
- Francesco Albani
- Alessandro Algardi
- Vincenzo Armanno
- Francesco Baratta
- Giovanni Francesco Barbieri
- Pietro Berettini da Cortona
- Francesco Boromino
- Giambattista Calandra
- Andrea Camassei
- Giovanni Angelo Canini
- Angelo Caroselli
- Michelangelo Cerquozzi
- Baccio Ciarpi
- Domenichino
- Francesco Fiammingo
- Giuliano Finelli
- Luigi Gentile
- Caterina Ginnasi
- Giovanni Lanfranco
- Martino Lunghi
- Giovanni Miele
- Agostino Mitelli
- Francesco Mochi
- Pier Francesco Mola
- Giuseppe Peroni
- Nicolo Poussino
- Girolamo Rainaldi
- Guido Reni
- Giovanni Francesco Romanelli
- Salvator Rosa
- Andrea Sacchi
- Agostino Tassi
- Pietro Testa
- Alessandro Turco
- Pietro Wander (Il Bamboccio)
