= June Van Cleef =

American photographer

June Van Cleef (born 23 September 1941) is an American photographer.

Van Cleef's work is included in the collections of the Harry Ransom Center, the Grace Museum, the Amon Carter Museum, and the Museum of Fine Arts Houston.

Van Cleef's photographs were collected in the 1992 book, The Way Home: Photographs from the Heart of Texas with text by Bryan Wooley. In 2005, another collection of Van Cleef's photos were published the book, The Texas Outback: Ranching on the Last Frontier: A Photographic Portrait.
