= Jan van Cleve (III) =

Flemish painter (1646–1716)

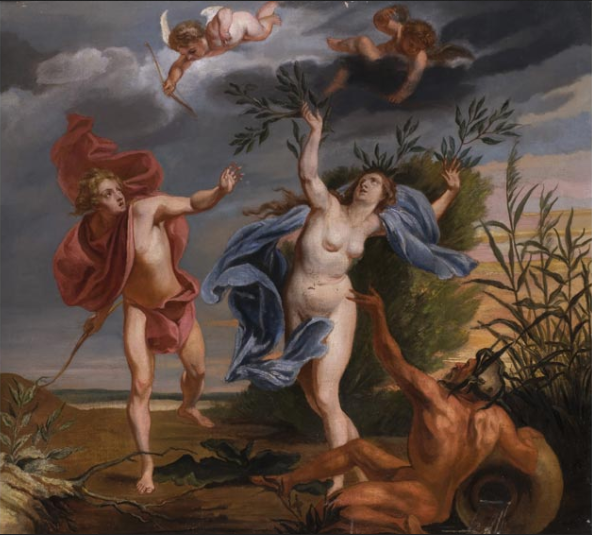
Apollo and Daphne

Jan van Cleve (III) or Jan van Cleef (III) (6 January 1646 – 18 December 1716) was a Dutch-born Flemish painter who is known for his altarpieces, allegorical pictures and mythological scenes. He worked in Brussels at the beginning of his career and later moved to Ghent.

== Life ==
Van Cleve was born in Venlo in the duchy of Guelders. Displaying from an early age an interest and facility in art, he went to Brussels where he joined the workshop of the Flemish artist Luigi Primo who had worked for a long period of time in Italy. He is believed to have moved later to the workshop of Gaspard de Crayer. While there is no documentary evidence for such apprenticeship, the stylistic closeness of van Cleve to de Crayer supports this fact. Van Cleve also completed and copied a number of works of de Crayer. When de Crayer left Brussels for Ghent around 1664, van Cleve followed his master and established himself in Ghent where he resided for the rest of his life.

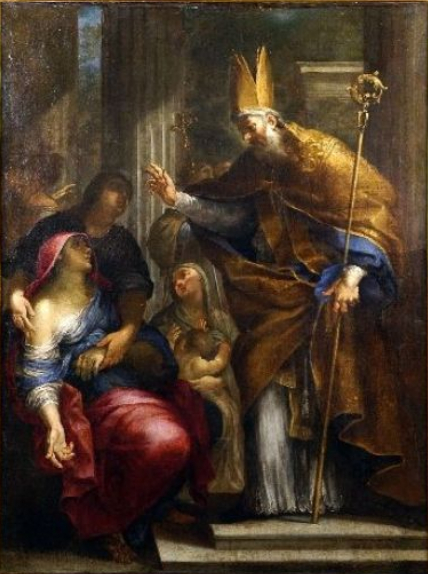
Saint Nicholas of Tolentino

After de Crayer died, van Cleve was commissioned to complete his master de Crayer's unfinished works in various churches and to finish the cartoons for the tapestries ordered by the French king Louis XIV from the Antwerp tapestry workshops. He travelled to France to show his cartoons to the king in person. He remained for three months in Paris.

He worked in Ghent until his death at the age of 70.

== Works ==
Jan van Cleve painted altarpieces, allegorical pictures and mythological scenes. He was a prolific painter who was commissioned to produce many religious works for the churches and convents in Flanders and Brabant. His style was close to that of his master de Crayer. His best works are in the convent of the Black Nuns in Ghent and the town hall of Ghent.
