= Zacharias Joachim Cleve =

Finnish pedagogue (1820–1900)

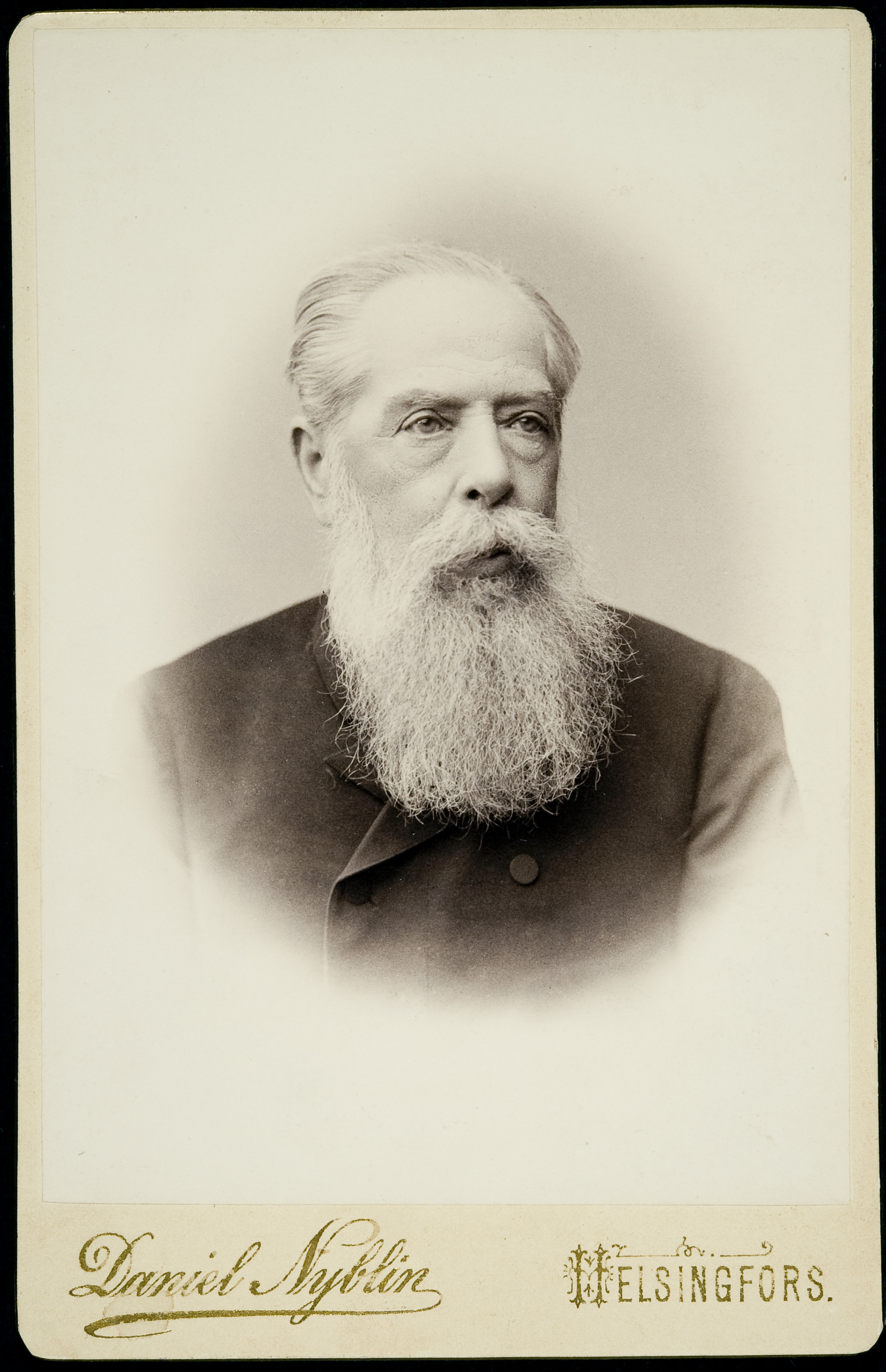

Zacharias Joachim Cleve (December 3, 1820 – January 20, 1900) was a Finnish pedagogue and philosopher. He served as an assistant professor of education and didactics (kasvatus- ja opetusoppi) at the University of Helsinki from 1862 to 1882. He was influential in establishing the Finnish school system.

Cleve was born in Rantasalmi to vicar Joachim Adolf and Juliana Aminoff. He received a doctorate in 1850 and became a teacher at the Kuopia Lyceum. In 1854 he wrote a book on pedagogy Försök till lärobok i psykologi. In 1860-61 he made a study trip which resulted in a doctoral thesis Skolan, Pedagogty utkast (1861) and in 1862 he was made professor of education. In 1864 he founded the Finnish educational association and edited its periodical. He published his last book Grunddrag till skolpedagogik in 1884.

Cleve was influenced by humanist ideas and Hegelian dialectics. He believed that the mission of education was to serve in a critical dialogue with the environment and he noted the need for a school's independence in determining the educational role. According to him this principled autonomy enabled it to be useful without being an instrument for organizing power or managing mindsets.
