= Vincent Adriaenssen =

Flemish painter

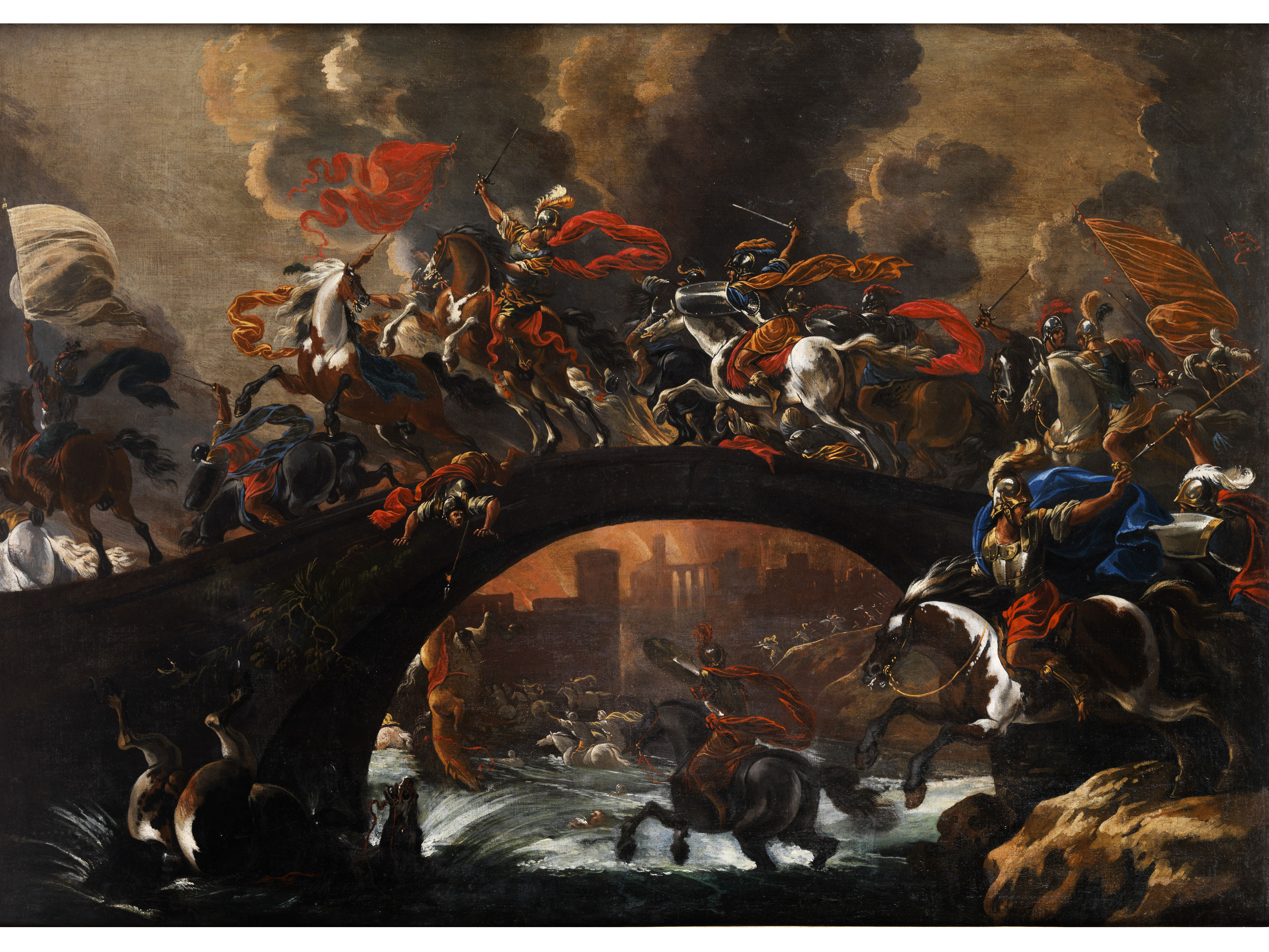
Battle with cavalry on a bridge

Vincent Adriaenssen (name variations: Vincent Adriaensz, Vincent Adriani, Vincenz Leckerbetien, Vincent Leckerbeetjen, nicknames: le Manchole, Il Manciola, Il Manciolla en Il Mozzo di Anversa) (1595–1675) was a Flemish Baroque painter who spent an important part of his career in Paris and Rome where he was especially renowned for his landscapes with battles and hunting scenes.

== Life ==
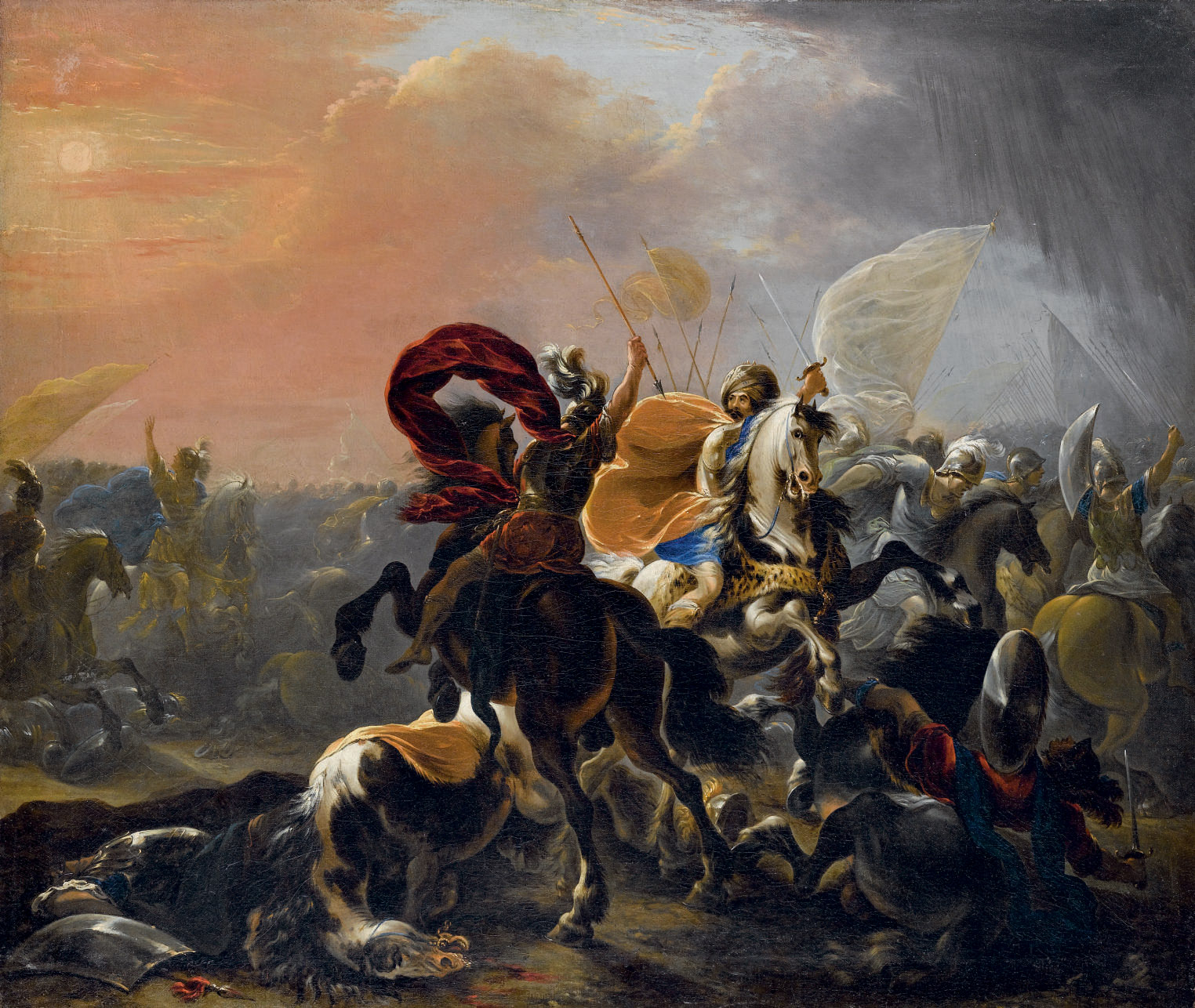
Battle between Turkish and Christian horsemen

He was born into an artistic family in Antwerp. His father Emanuel Adriaenssen was a prominent lutenist and composer. His older brother Alexander Adriaenssen was a successful painter specializing in still lifes and his younger brother Niclaes Adriaenssen was a portrait painter. He later became the father-in-law of the painter Jan de Momper.

It is believed that he received his first art training from his brother Alexander. He is traceable in Rome from 1625 to about 1645. He worked also on projects in Paris from 1642 to 1645 and then again in 1648 where he worked for Cardinal Mazarin and Cardinal Richelieu. He is recorded in Rome from 1661 onwards until his death.

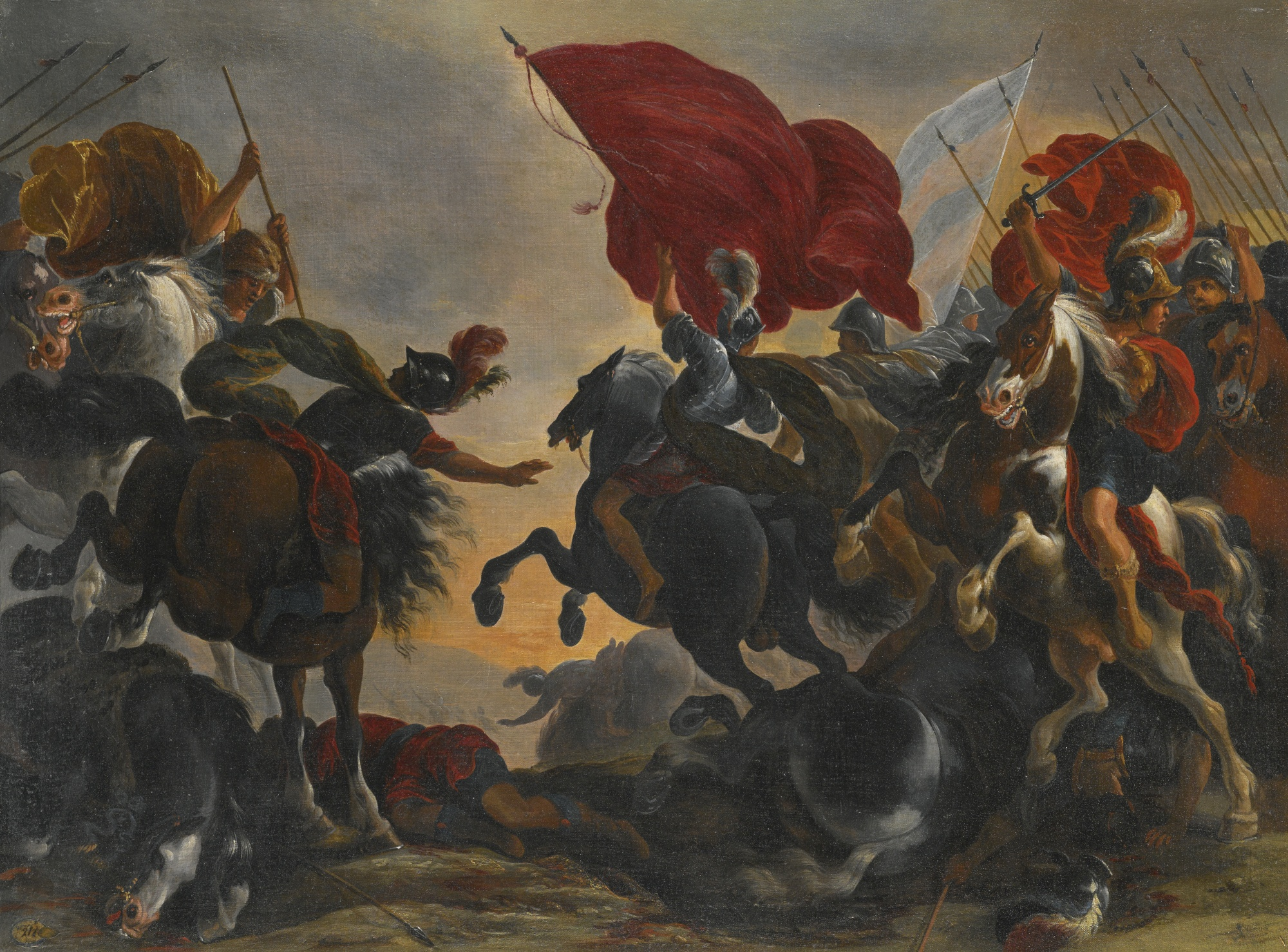
Cavalry battle scene

There are indications that he was missing his right arm and right hand from around 1663. This explains his French and Italian nicknames le Manchole, Il Manciola and Il Manciolla, which all mean 'the cripple'. Why he is also called by the nicknames ‘’Leckerbeetjen’’or ‘’Leckerbetien’’ is unknown. These names mean gourmet or gourmand but may also be a reference to the nickname of the Brabantine hero Gerard van Houwelingen. It is unknown whether or not he joined the Bentvueghels, an association of mainly Dutch and Flemish artists working in Rome who had the custom of giving their members a nickname (the so-called bentname).

The Flemish landscape painter Jan de Momper who was active in Rome married Vincent's daughter Agnes Vincentii (died in Rome on 19 April 1684). Adriaenssen was also Jan de Momper's early mentor in Rome. Adriaenssen is sometimes confused with the painter Vincent Malo.

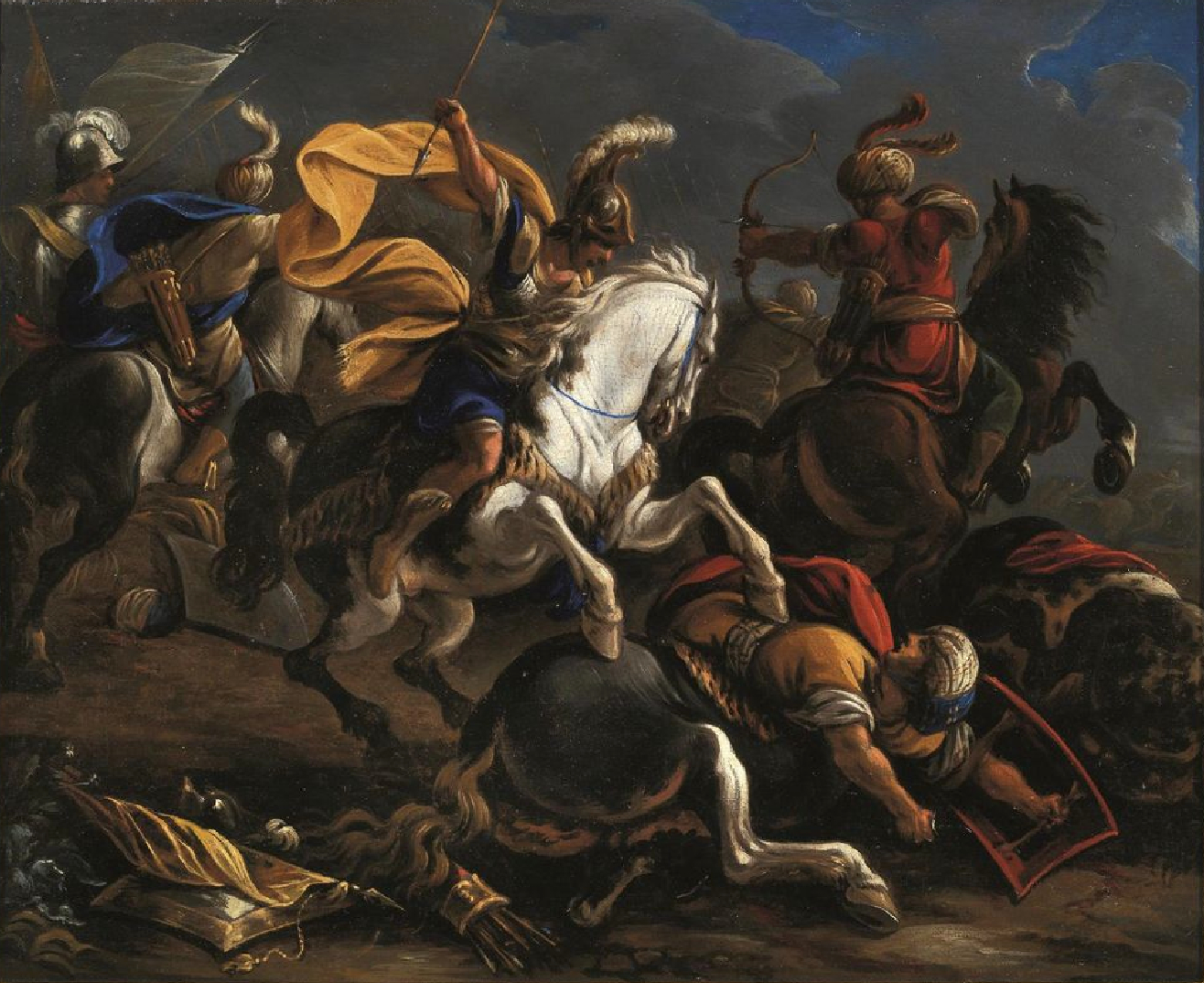
Cavalry battle between Turks and Christians

Vincent Adriaenssen died in Rome, aged about 80. He was the teacher of Michelangelo Cerquozzi in Rome and Luigi Garzi during his residence in Paris.

== Work ==
Vincent Adriaenssen was a very productive battle painter. This genre was very popular around the middle of the 17th century in Rome. His style situates itself between that of the late Cavalier d'Arpino and Tempesta and the more Baroque touch of Rubens and the Baroque innovations of the leading battle painter in Rome, the Frenchman Jacques Courtois, known as "ll Borgognone". These qualities are evident in his Battle with cavalry on a bridge (At Hampel on 1 July 2015 in Cologne lot 705). In this work Adriaenssen achieves a vivid portrayal of a cavalry engagement on a bridge. The numerous horses and riders in the scene have dynamism and a striking gesture as if they had been artificially brought to a standstill in their movement.
