= Peeter =

Male given name

- Gender: Male
- Name day: 29 June (Estonia)

Origin
- Region of origin: Belgium, Estonia, The Netherlands

Other names
- Related names: Peep, Peetrus

Peeter is a masculine given name, a cognate of the name Peter. It exists in Estonian, Flemish and Dutch languages. The Flemish/Dutch name may also be written as Pieter and occasionally translated as Peter.

Notable people with the given name include:

== Estonian ==
- Peeter All (1829–1898), Estonian fisherman, ship captain, ship owner and salvage diver
- Peeter Allik (1966–2019), Estonian surrealist artist
- Peeter Baranin (1882–1966), Estonian politician
- Peeter Ernits (born 1953), Estonian zoologist, journalist and politician
- Peeter Helme (born 1978), Estonian writer
- Peeter Hoppe (born 1960), Estonian Brigadier General
- Peeter Jakobi (1940–2014), Estonian actor
- Peeter Jakobson (1854–1899), Estonian writer
- Peeter Jalakas (born 1961), Estonian theatre director, producer, playwright and restaurateur
- Peeter Järvelaid (born 1957), Estonian legal scholar and historian
- Peeter Kaldur (born 1954), Estonian Lutheran clergyman
- Peeter Kann (1883–1943), Estonian military officer, jurist and judge
- Peeter Kard (1940–2006), Estonian actor
- Peeter Karu (1909–1942), Estonian sport shooter
- Peeter Kõpp (1888–1960), Estonian agronomist, politician and professor
- Peeter Kreitzberg (1948–2011), Estonian politician
- Peeter Kümmel (born 1982), Estonian cross-country skier and Olympic competitor
- Peeter Lamp (born 1944), Estonian tennis player and coach
- Peeter Laurits (born 1962), Estonian artist and photographer
- Peeter Laurson (born 1971), Estonian chemist, economist and politician
- Peeter Lepp (born 1943), Estonian politician
- Peeter Lilje (1950–1993), Estonian conductor
- Peeter Luksep (1955–2015), Swedish politician
- Peeter Malvet (1907–1978), Estonian military soldier, jurist and politician
- Peeter Mardna (born 1938), Estonian rower, coach and physician
- Peeter Mudist (1942–2013) Estonian painter, sculptor and print-maker
- Peeter Mürk (1911–1974), Estonian weightlifter
- Peeter Nelis (born 1953), Estonian fencer and coach
- Peeter Oja (born 1960), Estonian actor, singer, comedian and media personality
- Peeter Olesk (1953–2021), Estonian literary scholar and politician
- Peeter Olesk (born 1993), Estonian sport shooter
- Peeter Päkk (born 1957), Estonian sports shooter
- Peeter Pedaja (1931–1985), Estonian-Australian refugee, sculptor and adventurer
- Peeter Pere (born 1957), Estonian architect and artist
- Peeter Põld (1878–1930), Estonian pedagogic scientist, school director and politician
- Peeter Rahnel (born 1957), Estonian politician
- Peeter Raudsepp (born 1970), Estonian business executive and politician
- Peeter Rebane (born 1973), Estonian film director, producer and entrepreneur
- Peeter Saan (born 1959), Estonian conductor and military officer
- Peeter Saari (born 1945), Estonian physicist
- Peeter Sauter (born 1962), Estonian author and actor
- Peeter Simm (1953–2026), Estonian film director
- Peeter Süda (1883–1920), Estonian organist, composer and collector of Estonian folksongs
- Peeter Tali (born 1964), Estonian military officer and journalist
- Peeter Tarvas (1916–1987), Estonian architect and professor
- Peeter Tammearu (born 1964), Estonian actor and theatre director
- Peeter Tooming (1939–1997), Estonian photographer, documentary film director and journalist
- Peeter Torop (born 1950), Estonian semiotician and scientist
- Peeter Tulviste (1945–2017), Estonian psychologist, educator and politician
- Peeter Turnau (born 1994), Estonian fencer
- Peeter Urbla (born 1945), Estonian film director, producer and screenwriter
- Peeter Vähi (born 1955), Estonian composer
- Peeter Vihalemm (born 1944), Estonian communication scholar, sociologist and social psychologist
- Peeter Volkonski (born 1954), Estonian actor, rock-musician and composer
- Peeter Volmer (1940–2002), Estonian singer and actor
- Peeter Võsa (born 1967), Estonian journalist, television presenter and politician
- Peeter Võsu (born 1958), Estonian politician

== Flemish / Dutch ==
- Peeter Gijsels (1621–1690), Flemish Baroque painter
- Peeter Sion
- Peeter Baltens
- Peeter Symons
- Gaspar Peeter Verbruggen the Younger
- Peeter Cornet
- Jan Peeter Verdussen
- Peeter van Bredael
- Gaspar Peeter Verbruggen the Elder
- Peter Franchoys
- Pieter Snyers
- Jan Peeter van Bredael the Elder
- Pieter Boel
- Peeter van Loon
- Pieter Verdussen
- Pieter Meert
- Peeter van Aelst (disambiguation)
- Pieter Verbrugghen I
- Pieter van Bloemen
- Peter Snayers
- Jan Pieter van Bredael the Younger
- Peter Frans Casteels
- Pieter Stalpaert
- Jan Pieter Brueghel
- Pieter Jan Snyers
- Peter Vanden Gheyn (disambiguation)
- Peter I Vanden Gheyn
- Pieter van Aelst (17th century)
- Peter IV Vanden Gheyn
- Pieter Bout
- Pieter Scheemaeckers
- Pieter van Aelst (disambiguation)
- Peter Danckerts de Rij
- Petrus Phalesius the Elder
- Pieter Meulener
- Pieter Faes
- Pieter Hardimé
- Pieter van der Borcht (III)
- Pieter Stevens II
