= Peep =

Peep, Peeps, or PEEP may refer to:

== People ==
- Peep (given name), Estonian masculine given name
- Lil Peep (1996–2017), American singer and rapper
- Helend Peep (1910–2007), Estonian actor
- Viljar Peep (born 1969), Estonian historian and civil servant
- People, or peeps, often referring to a certain group

== Other uses ==
- PEEP, a personal emergency evacuation plan agreed with or provided for an individual with support needs in the event of an emergency evacuation
- Peep (album), by Rasmus
- Peeps, a type of candy
- Peeps (novel), by Scott Westerfeld
- Positive end-expiratory pressure, a measure of lung function
- Stint, a type of bird
- Peeps (Regular Show), an episode
- Peep, a baby chick in the television series Peep and the Big Wide World

== See also ==
- Bo Peep (disambiguation)
- Peeping (disambiguation)
- Peeper (disambiguation)
