= Verdussen =

Verdussen is a Flemish or Dutch surname. Notable people with the surname include:

- Jan Peeter Verdussen (1700–1763), Flemish painter
- Pieter Verdussen (1662 – after 1710), Flemish painter and draftsman

== See also ==
- Verdussen family, a family of printers and book sellers active in Antwerp in the 17th and 18th centuries
