= Peep (given name) =

Male given name

- Gender: Male
- Name day: 29 June

Origin
- Region of origin: Estonia

Other names
- Related names: Peeter, Peetrus

Peep is an Estonian masculine given name. Notable people with the given name include:

- Peep Aru (born 1953), Estonian politician
- Peep Jänes (born 1936), Estonian architect
- Peep Jöffert (1944–2024), Estonian racing cyclist
- Peep Lassmann (1948–2025), Estonian pianist
- Peep Peterson (born 1975), Estonian politician
- Peep Sürje (1945–2013), Estonian civil engineer and professor
