= Peter Vanden Gheyn =

Peter Vanden Gheyn (Period Dutch: Peeter Vanden Gheÿn or Ghein) may refer to any of several members of a noted family of bellfounders in the Spanish Netherlands. They are conventionally disambiguated with Roman numerals:

- Peter I Vanden Gheyn (1500–1561), son of Willem Van den Ghein, founder of the dynasty
- Peter II Vanden Gheyn (died 1598), son of Peter I
- Peter III Vanden Gheyn (1553–1618), son of Peter II
- Peter IV Vanden Gheyn (1605 or 1607–1654), grandson of Peter II by his youngest son Jan
- Peter V Vanden Gheyn (died 1717), grandson of Peter IV by his son Andreas
- Peter VI Vanden Gheyn, son of Peter V
