= Peeping =

Peeping may refer to:

- Leaf peeping, observing autumn foliage
- Voyeurism, spying on intimate behaviors
- Scrying, a type of magical seeing

== See also ==
- Peeping Tom (disambiguation)
- Peep (disambiguation)
- Peeper (disambiguation)
