= Jasper Broers =

Flemish painter (1682–1716)

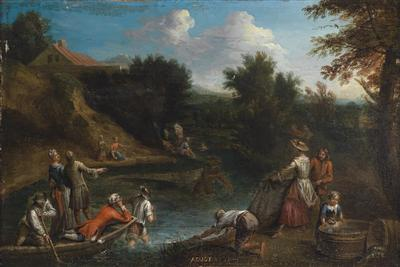
The Month of August

Jasper Broers (Antwerp, 21 April 1682 – Antwerp, 1716) was a Flemish painter. He is known for his landscapes and allegorical compositions and was a leading battle painter in Flanders in the first two decades of the 18th century.

== Life ==
Jasper Broers was born in Antwerp in a lowly family. His father Joris died when he was only 4 months old. His mother Suzanna Jegers sent him at the age of 13 to study painting with Jan Baptist van der Meiren, a landscape and battle painter. In 1703 he became a master of the Antwerp Guild of St. Luke.

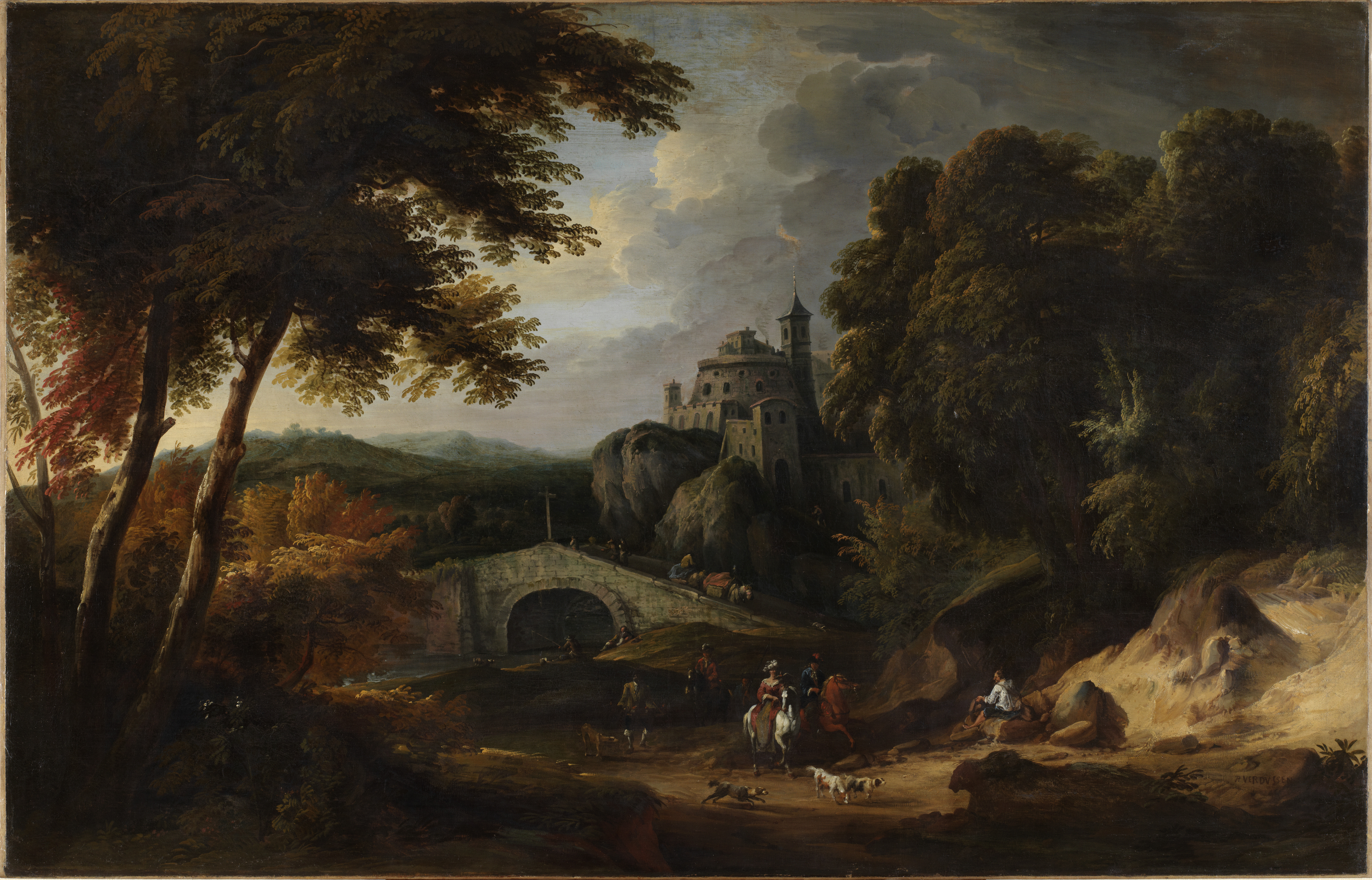
Landscape with bridge

On 27 June 1704 Jasper married Catharina Verdussen. It is not clear whether she was the Catarina Verdussen who in 1696 became a master painter in the Antwerp Guild of St. Luke as a daughter of a master. It is known that Broers collaborated with the painter Pieter Verdussen, who was the brother of the painter Catarina Verdussen. Jasper Broers and Catharina Verdussen remained childless.

Broers suffered from a weak constitution and on 15 May 1713 he was so ill that he drew up a will. About three years later he died. He was buried in the St Andrew Church in Antwerp on 19 January 1716.

== Work ==
Jasper Broers is known for his landscapes and allegorical compositions. He was a leading battle painter in Flanders in the first two decades of the 18th century. Only very few of his works are preserved.

The artist had a preference for battle scenes involving cavalry engagements at close range placed in a sweeping and dramatic landscape. His small battle-pieces were painted in a manner close to that of Jan van Huchtenburg and Karel Breydel.

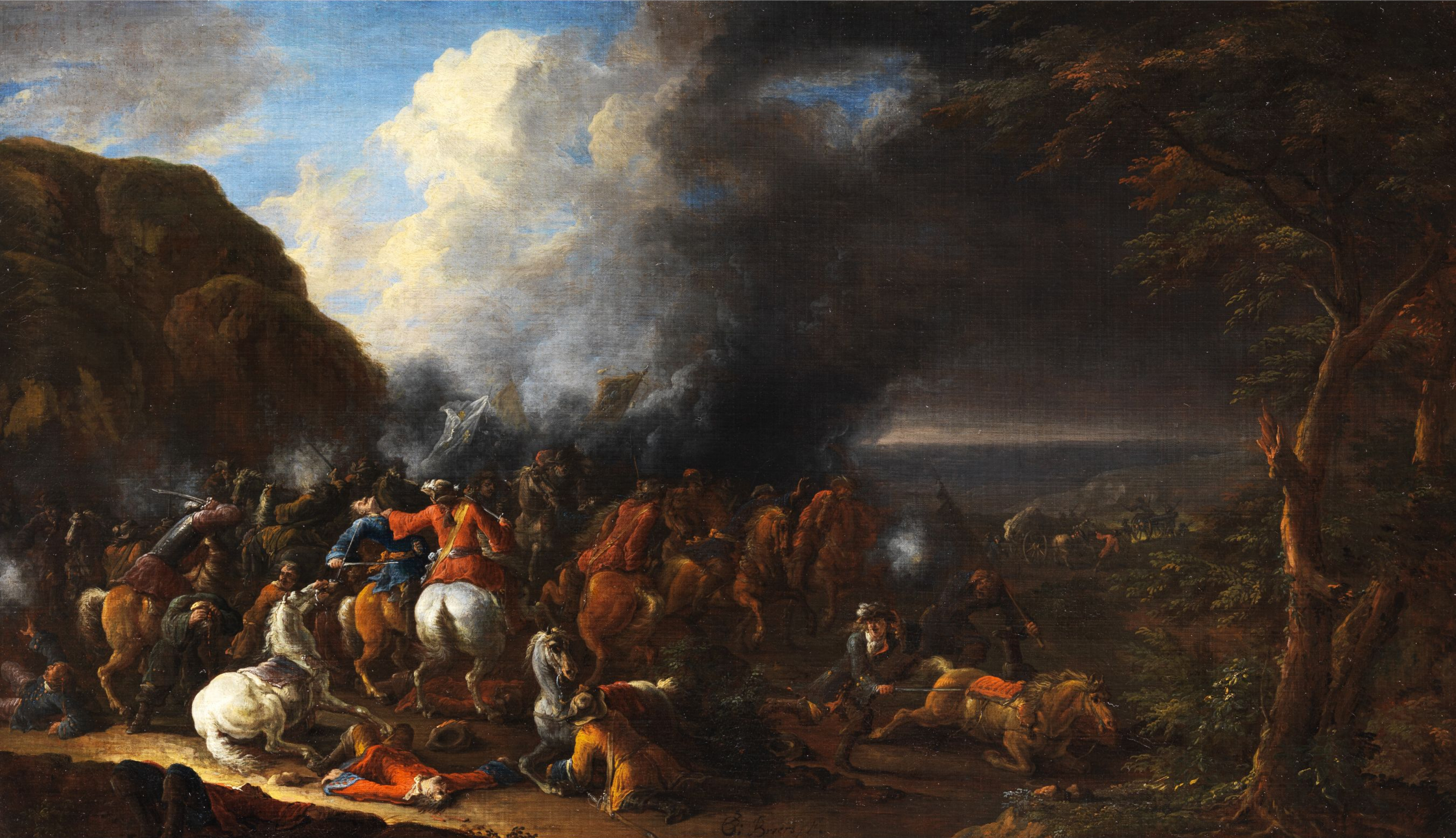
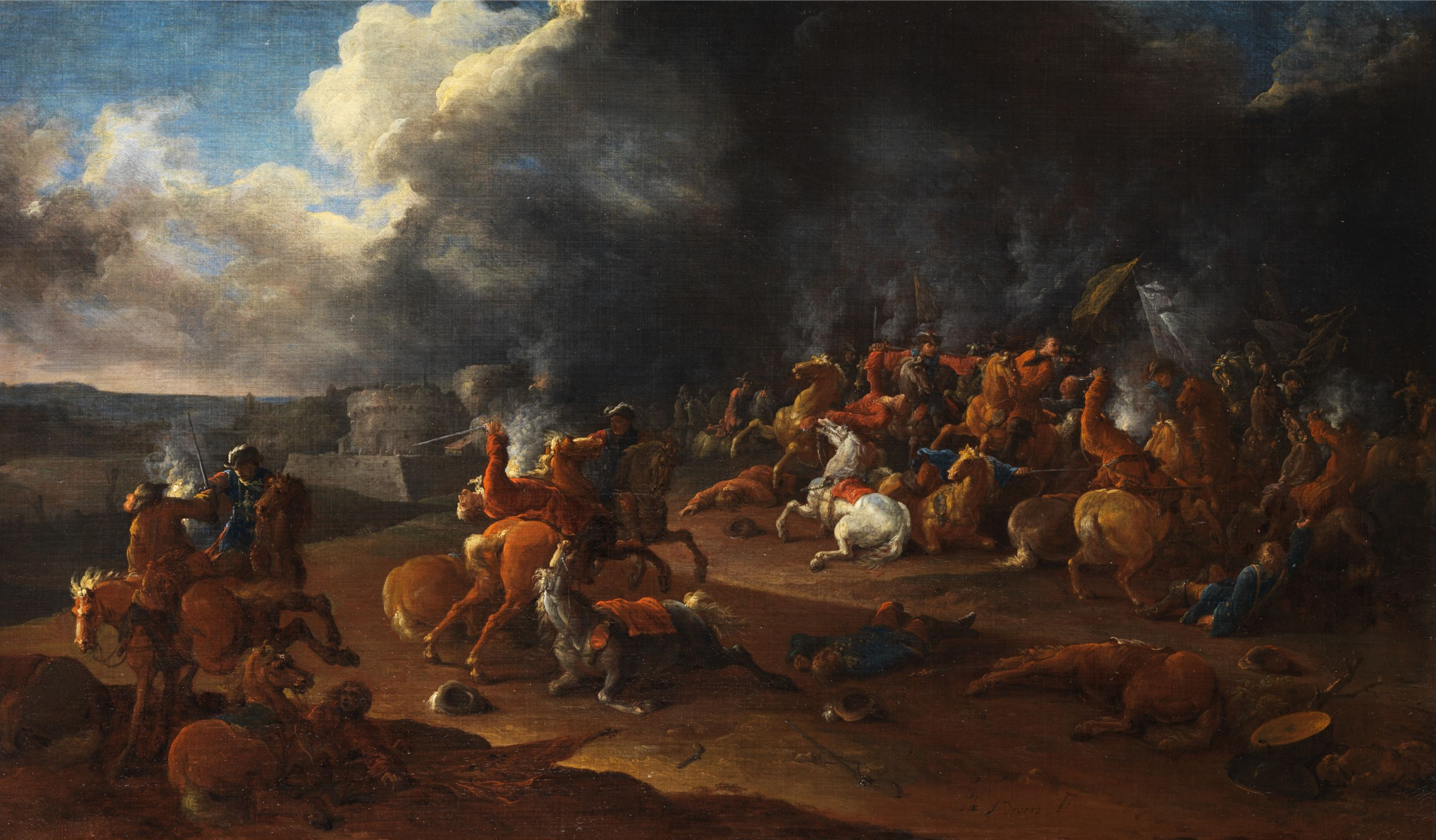
Pair of cavalry clashes

Broers regularly painted his battle scenes in pairs in a horizontal format. He would place the battle action in the two compositions at opposite sides of the canvases so as to create a comparatively free space in the middle of the picture. An example is the pair of cavalry clashes auctioned at Hampel Fine Art Auctions Munich on 20 September 2012 (lot 296). Broers heightens the drama of the battle carnage through the dramatic cloud formations, which start at the bottom with the black gunpowder fumes that merge higher up into the lighter, sun-lit spring clouds. While the battle action takes place under the clouds as well as on the side of the rising hills, the artist has arranged for some light coming from the left in both compositions to fall on a few riders prominently placed in the middle ground. In the pictures, the central figures are a rider on a white horse and riders on two brown horses. In the left picture, the shining back of the white horse is emphasized further by the red coat of the rider, who is fighting a rider in a blue coat. The motif of the illuminated white horse was often used by the Dutch battle painter Philips Wouwerman.

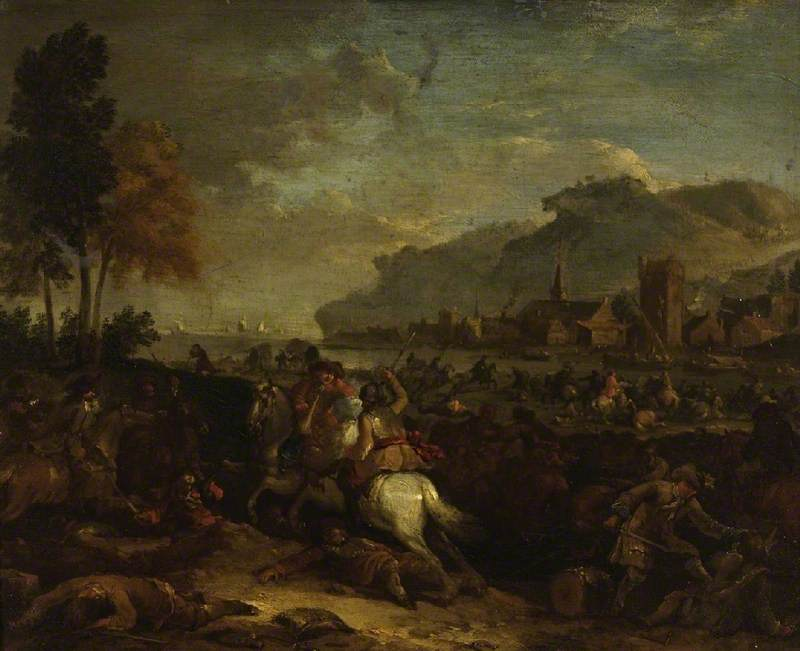
Battle piece

His Battle of Ekeren (1703–1716, Plantin-Moretus Museum) depicts an important battle of the War of the Spanish Succession fought on 30 June 1703 near Antwerp between a French force and a Dutch army, which became encircled and barely avoided destruction. Unlike contemporary Flemish battle painters Constantijn Francken and Pieter Verdussen who painted the same battle from an undramatic bird's-eye view, Broers tried to maintain the drama in his composition by moving the action closer and placing it at nightfall allowing him to exploit light effects of fire and smoke. The battle is depicted from the French perspective and the French commander and his staff are depicted on the right.

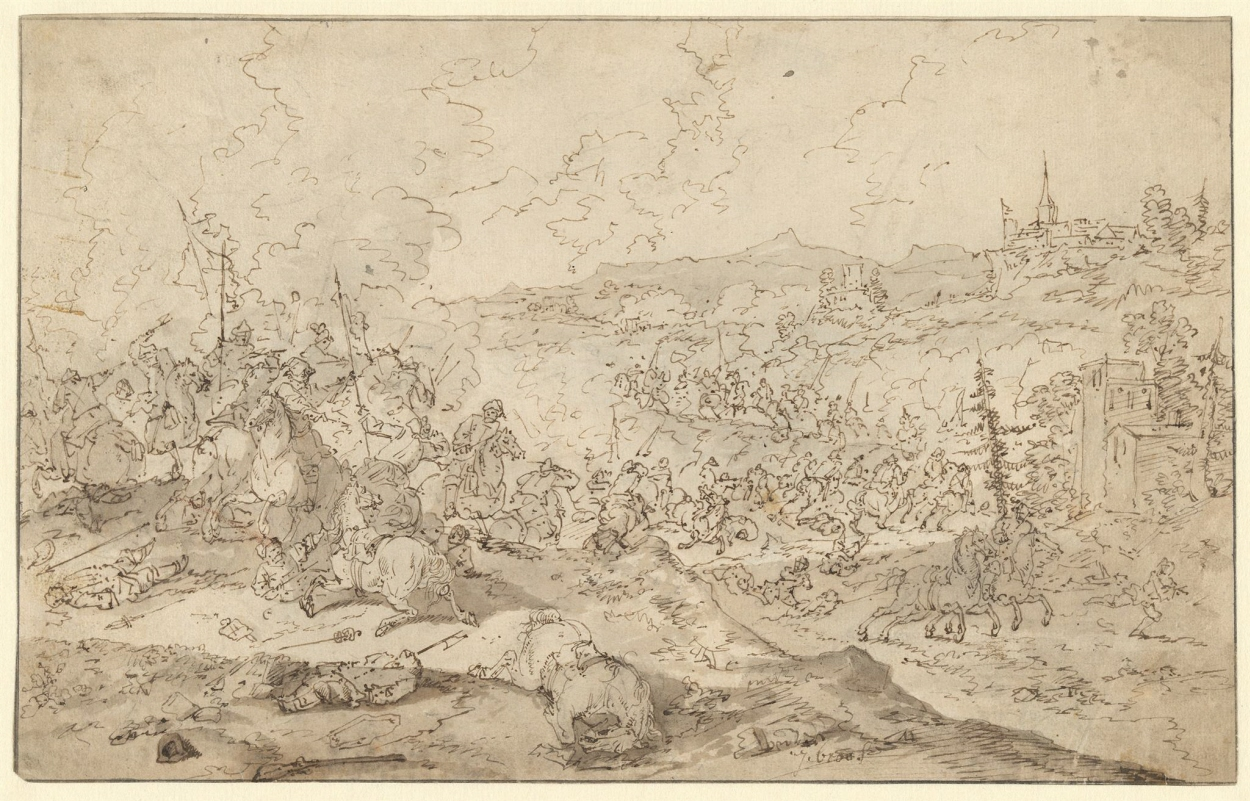
Cavalry battle

Another subject matter to which Broers returned is the analogy of the months of which he is known to have painted a cycle.

Only a few of Jasper Broers' drawings can be securely attributed to him. Two, one of which signed, are in the collection of the Hamburger Kunsthalle. The signed Cavalry battle has a composition, which is reminiscent of his cavalry battle paintings such as the Cavalry skirmish (Auctioned at Bonhams in London on 27 October 2004, lot 10). With the light and sometimes nervous application of the pen on the paper angular and the edgy and at times closely curled outlines, he shows in this drawing that he had found his own artistic language.
