= David de Coninck =

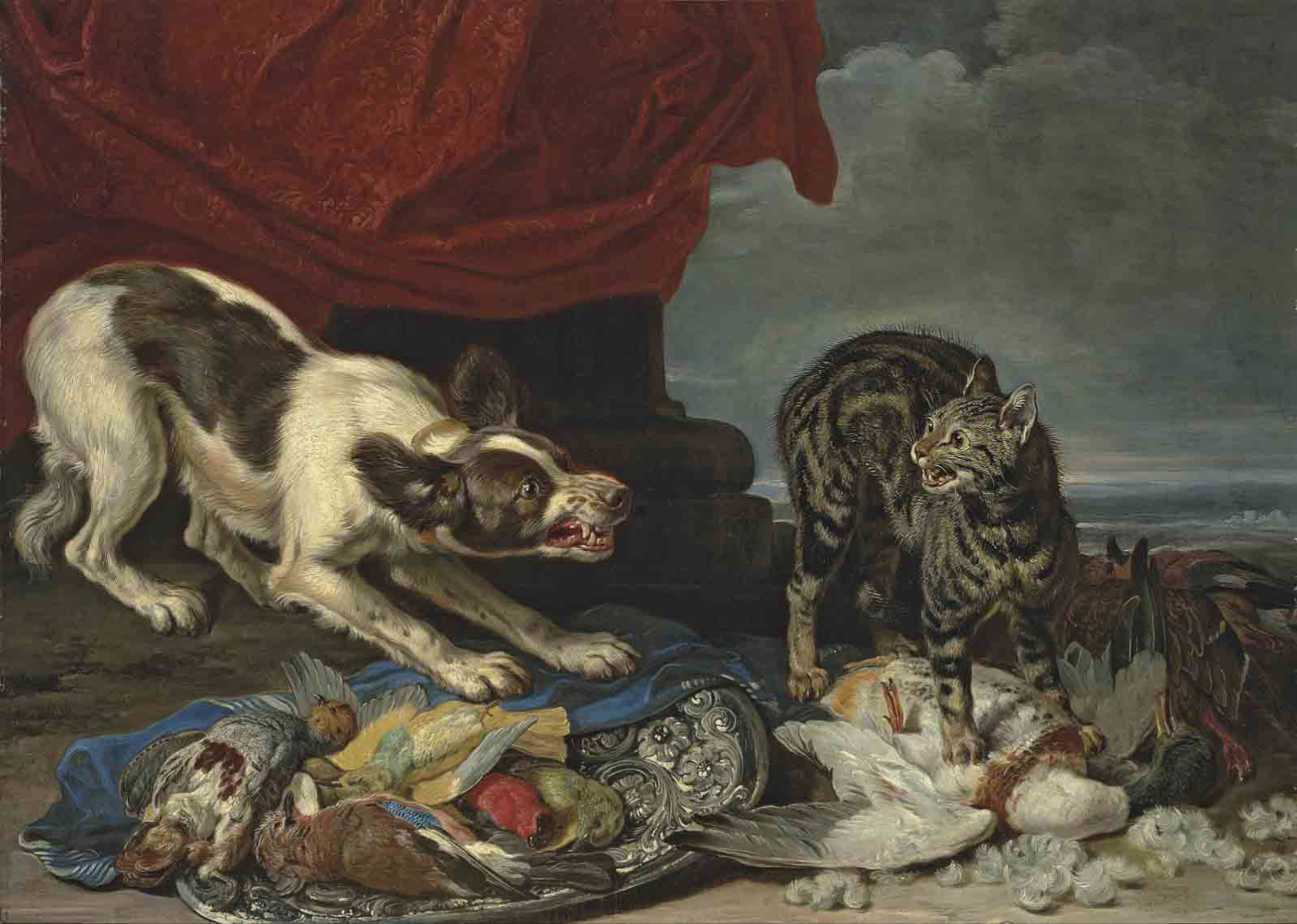
A cat and a dog fighting over fowl

David de Coninck or David de Koninck, also known as Rammelaer (ca. 1644, Antwerp – after 1701, probably Brussels) was a Flemish painter who specialised in still lifes and landscapes with animals and hunting scenes. Recognised as a leading animal painter, de Coninck was able to develop an international career which caused him to work for extended periods in Paris, Rome and Vienna.

== Life ==
He was apprenticed to Pieter Boel in 1659. Pieter Boel was an accomplished animal painter who had been trained by Jan Fyt, the leading Flemish animal painter of the mid 17th century. De Coninck became a master in the Antwerp Guild of Saint Luke in 1663.

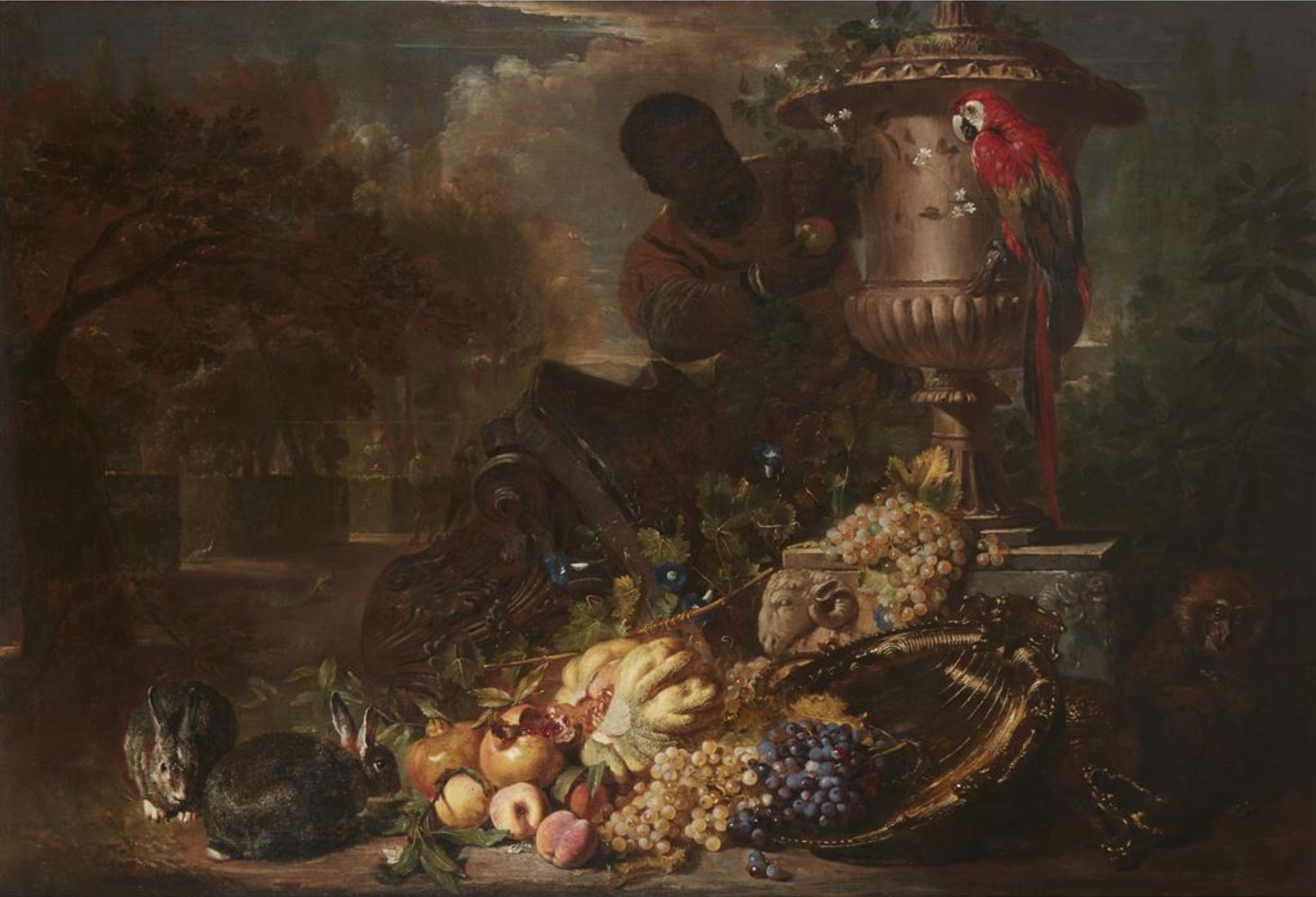
Still life of fruit, a black servant and animals in a landscape

He moved to Paris where he worked with the prominent Flemish animal painter Nicasius Bernaerts for several years, probably until 1669. Nicasius Bernaerts was an influential Flemish animal painter who worked for the royal court and was a member of the Royal Academy of Painting and Sculpture in Paris.

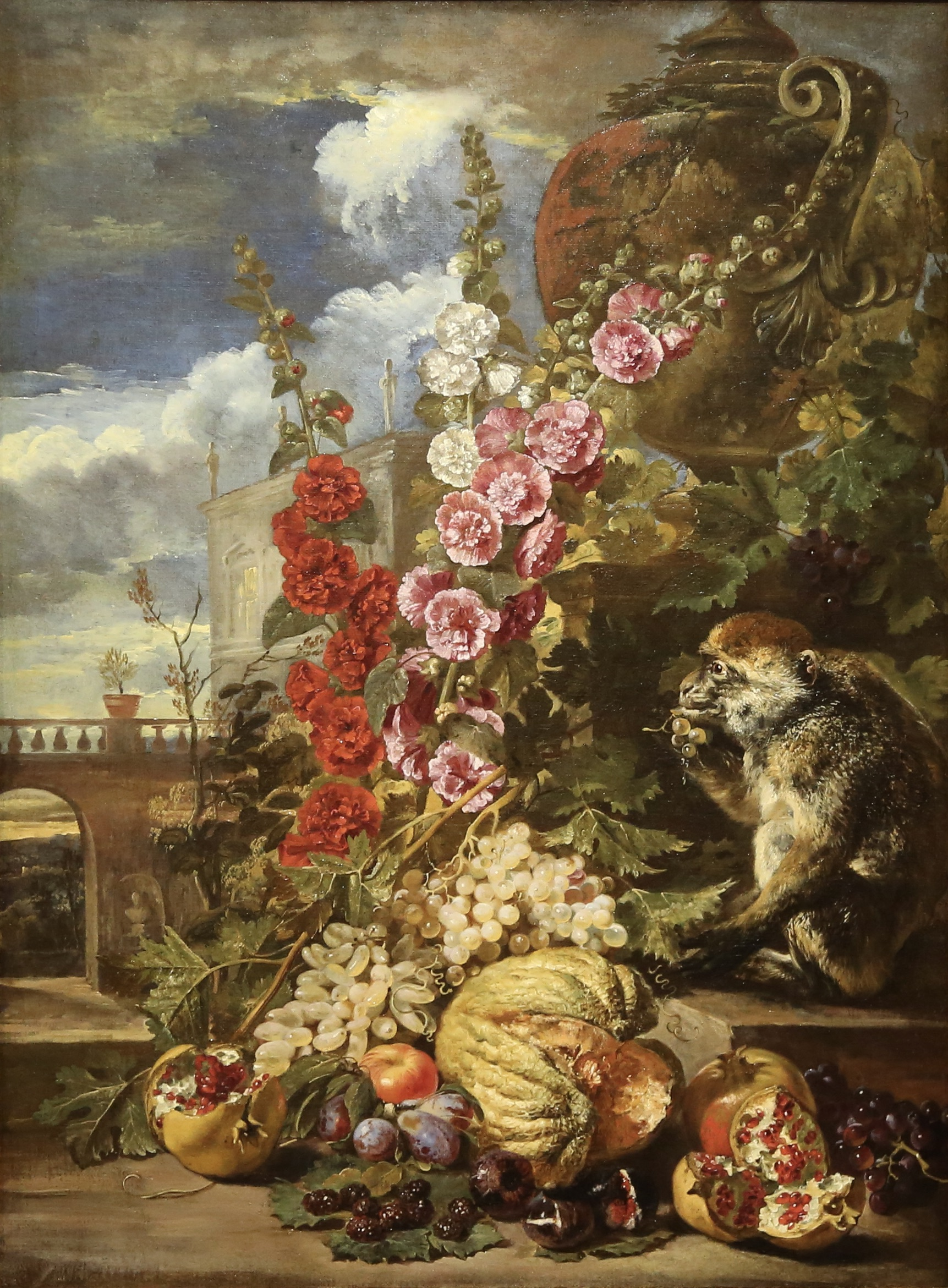
Still life with flowers, fruits and small monkey

De Coninck subsequently travelled to Rome where he lived from 1671 to 1694. Here he became a member of the Bentvueghels, an association of mainly Dutch and Flemish artists working in Rome, and took the nickname (the so-called 'bent name') 'Rammelaer' (which means 'rattle'). His name was inscribed in a niche in the Santa Costanza church in Rome where the Bentvueghels used to congregate.

On his return to the north he stayed for a time in Vienna. He returned to Antwerp in 1687. He moved to Brussels at some time between 1699 and 1701. The last record of de Coninck is his registration as a became a member of the Brussels Guild of Saint Luke in 1701. It is not known when or where he died.

== Work ==
De Coninck painted still lifes, including fruit still lifes and hunting still lifes, landscapes with hunting scenes and architectural paintings. De Coninck's stylistic development is unclear and it is difficult to date his paintings with any precision. It is possible that early in his career he painted fruit still lifes, since there is a record that in 1668 two fruit still lifes made by a 'Koninck' were exported to Vienna.

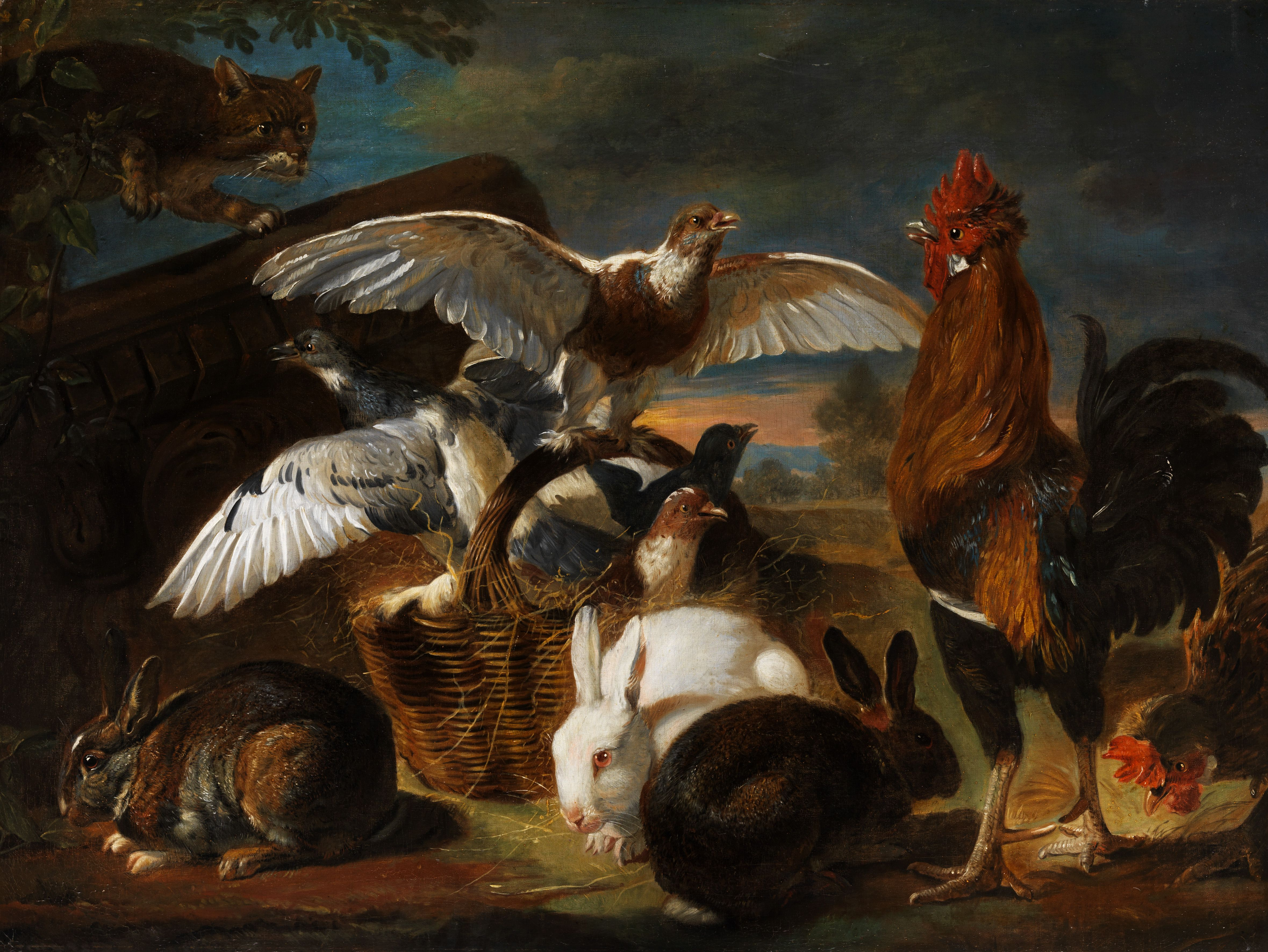
Allegory of Vigilance

De Coninck's teacher Pieter Boel was a pupil of Jan Fyt, the leading Flemish animal painter of the mid 17th century. This explains the influence of Jan Fyt's style on de Coninck's work. Some works of David de Coninck and Pieter Boel are still attributed to Fyt. As David de Coninck rarely signed his works, which are generally of a high quality and similar style they have often been confused with the works of Boel, Fyt and even Frans Snijders, the leading Flemish animal painter of the first half of the 17th century.

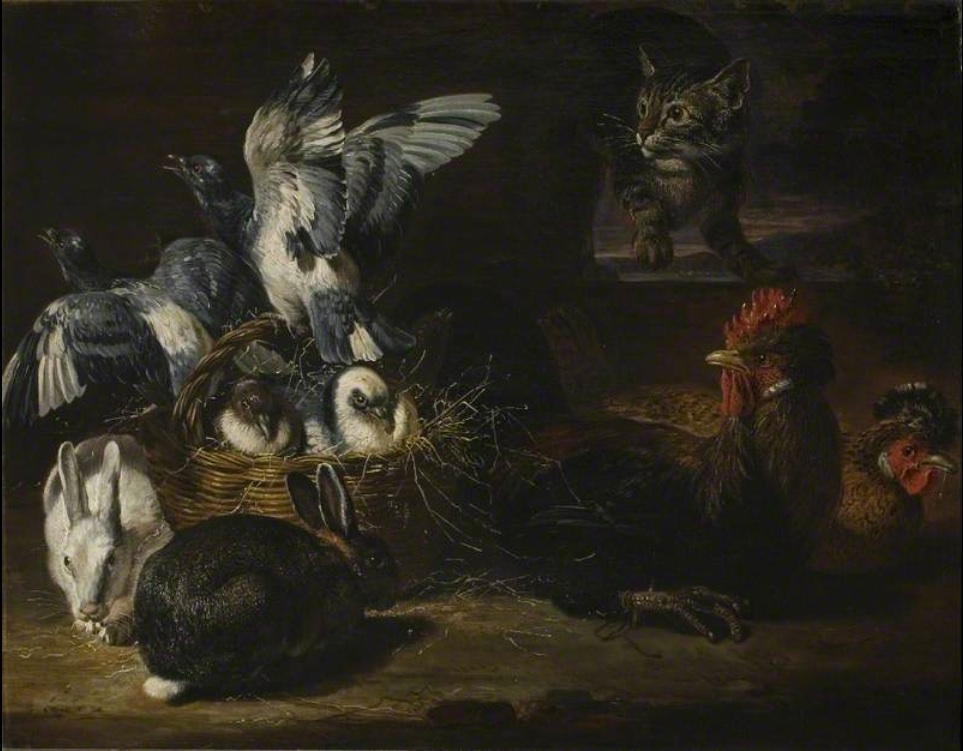
Poultry and cat

His fruit still lifes of fruits and flowers painted on large canvases are complex Baroque compositions, which often include animals in an outdoor setting. Large, Italianate fruit still lifes in the Musée des Beaux-Arts de Nantes can likely also be attributed to de Coninck. An example of his fruit still lifes is the Still life of fruit and flowers with animals (Musée Fesch), which shows a still life with fruits and flowers near an outdoor fountain and a landscape in the distance. A monkey, two rabbits and a parrot enliven the painting.

De Coninck was an accomplished painter of scenes with animals, mainly birds, in a garden or against a landscape background. He painted lively action scenes of fighting cats and dogs, packs of dogs attacking game and birds of prey or cats attacking birds or poultry.

De Coninck's work influenced other artists in Italy such as Baldassare De Caro, Giovanni Crivelli (named 'il Crivellino'), Nicola Malinconico, Franz Werner von Tamm and Jacob Xavier Vermoelen.
