= Pieter van Aelst =

Peter van Aelst, Peeter van Aelst or Pieter van Aelst is the name of a number of artists including:

- Pieter Coecke van Aelst, a Flemish painter of the 16th century
- Peeter van Aelst, a 17th-century Dutch still life painter referred to by Cornelis de Bie in his Het Gulden Cabinet
- Pieter van Aelst, a 17th-century Flemish genre painter active in Antwerp from 1644 to 1654
- Pieter van Aelst III, a Flemish tapestry weaver of the 16th century
