= Peeper =

Peeper or Peepers may refer to:

- Peeper (film), a 1976 comedy film
- Peepers (film), a 2010 film
- Peepers (Marvel Comics), a comic book character
- Peeper, the fish and unofficial mascot of the video game Subnautica
- A person engaging in voyeurism
- The spring peeper, a small tree frog
- Marcel Peeper (born 1965), Dutch footballer
- Eyes

== See also ==
- Peep (disambiguation)
- Peeping (disambiguation)
