= Jacob Xavier Vermoelen =

Flemish painter

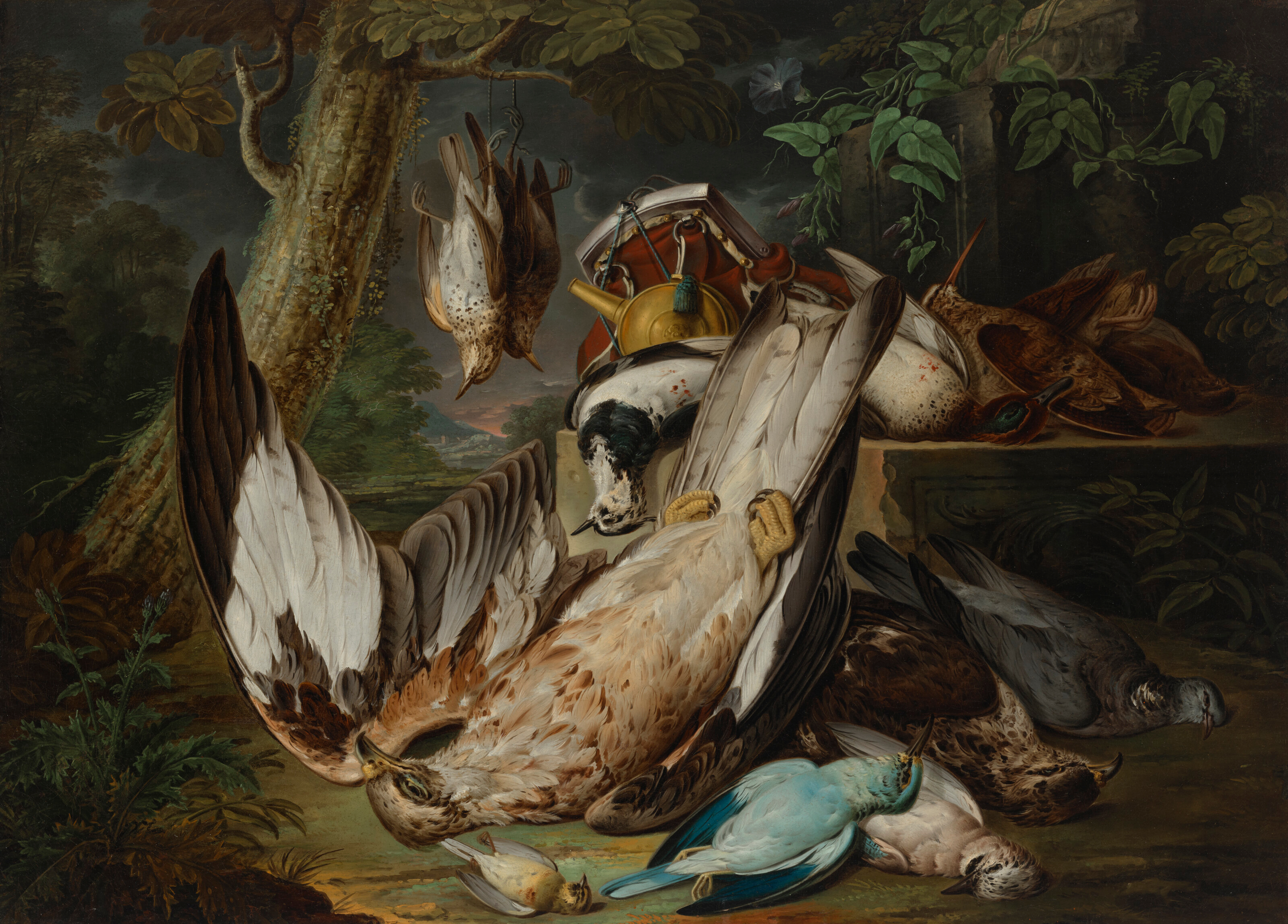
Still Life of Dead Game Birds

Jacob Xavier Vermoelen or Jacob Xaver Vermoelen (c. 1714 – 1784) was a Flemish painter of still lifes and game pieces who was active in Rome.

== Life ==
Vermoelen was born in Antwerp, where he trained under Pieter Snyers. He became a master of the Antwerp Guild of Saint Luke in 1733. Nothing is recorded about his activity in Antwerp. He is recorded as executing a number of paintings in Rome in 1748. In Rome he appears to have enjoyed high patronage as is demonstrated by two still lifes that he made for the renowned art collector Cardinal Silvio Valenti Gonzaga.

He died in Rome.

== Work ==
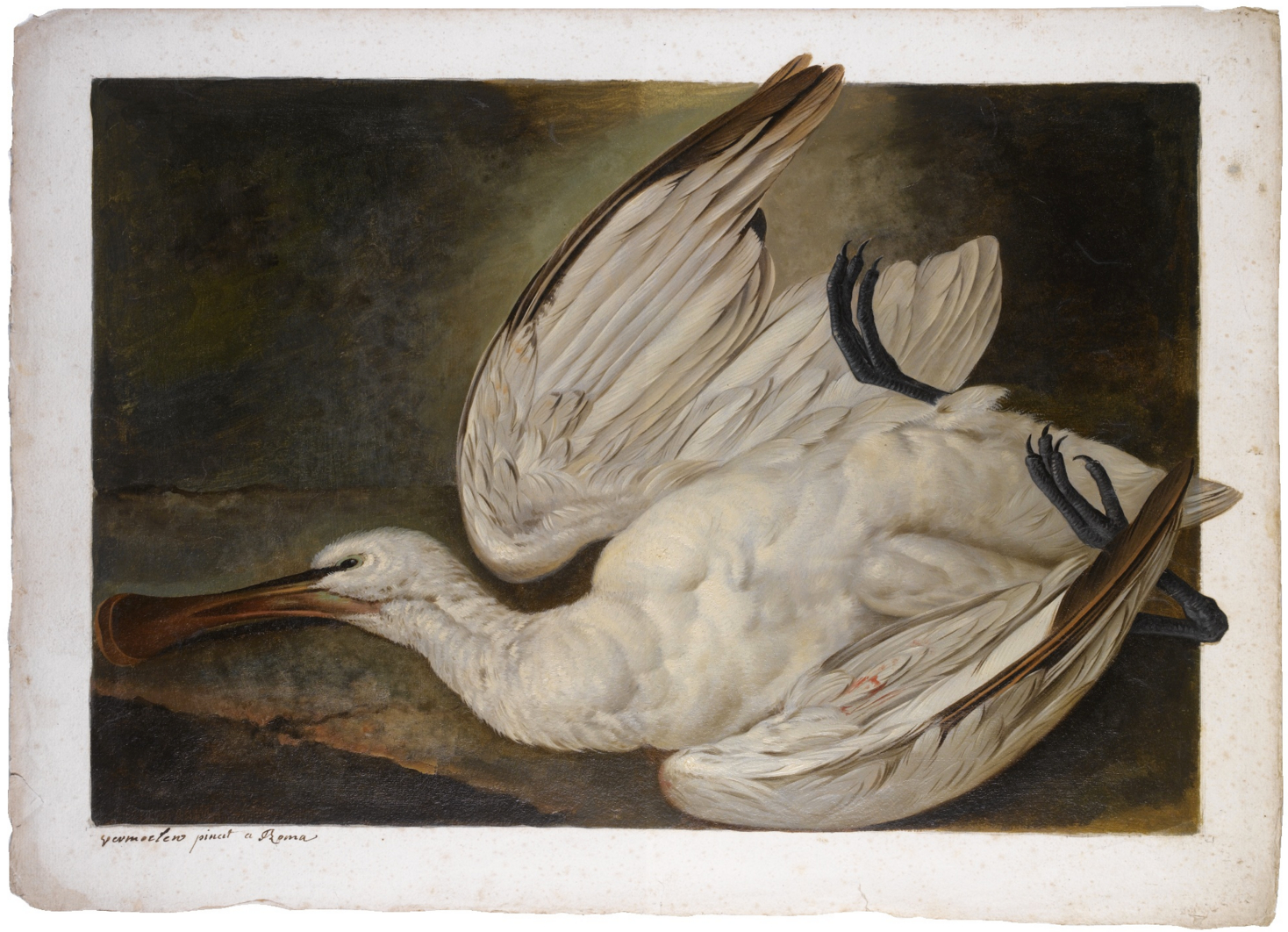
Dead Spoonbill

Only about 14 or so of Vermoelen's works are known. They all depict dead birds and are dated between 1748 and 1755. He was influenced by the Antwerp painter David de Coninck who was known for his game pieces.
