= Peeter Laurson =

Estonian chemist, economist and politician

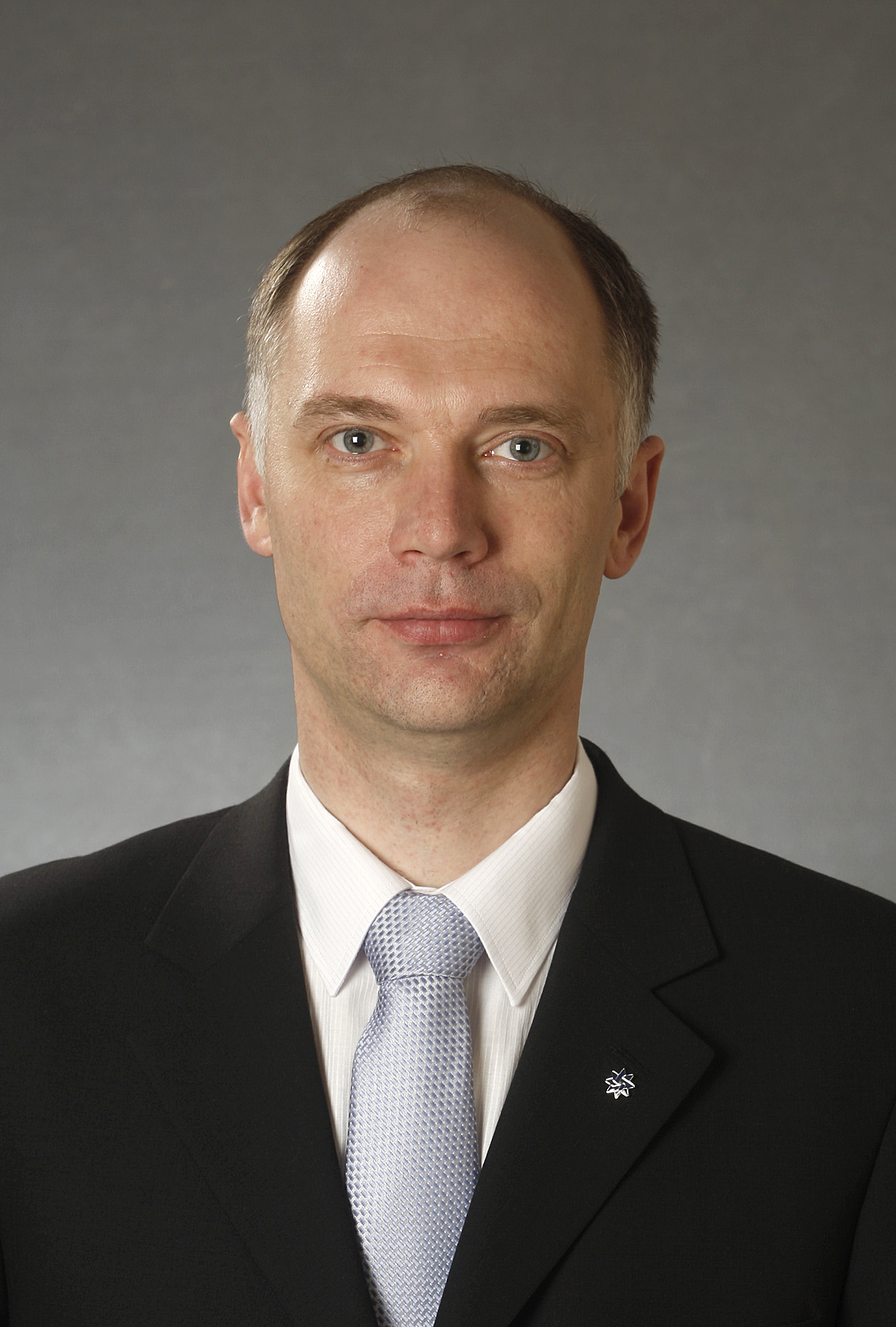
Peeter Laurson

Peeter Laurson (born 4 February 1971 in Tartu) is an Estonian chemist, economist and politician. He was a member of XII Riigikogu.

He has been a member of party Isamaa.
