= Peeter Tooming =

Estonian photographer, documentary film director, and journalist (1939–1997)

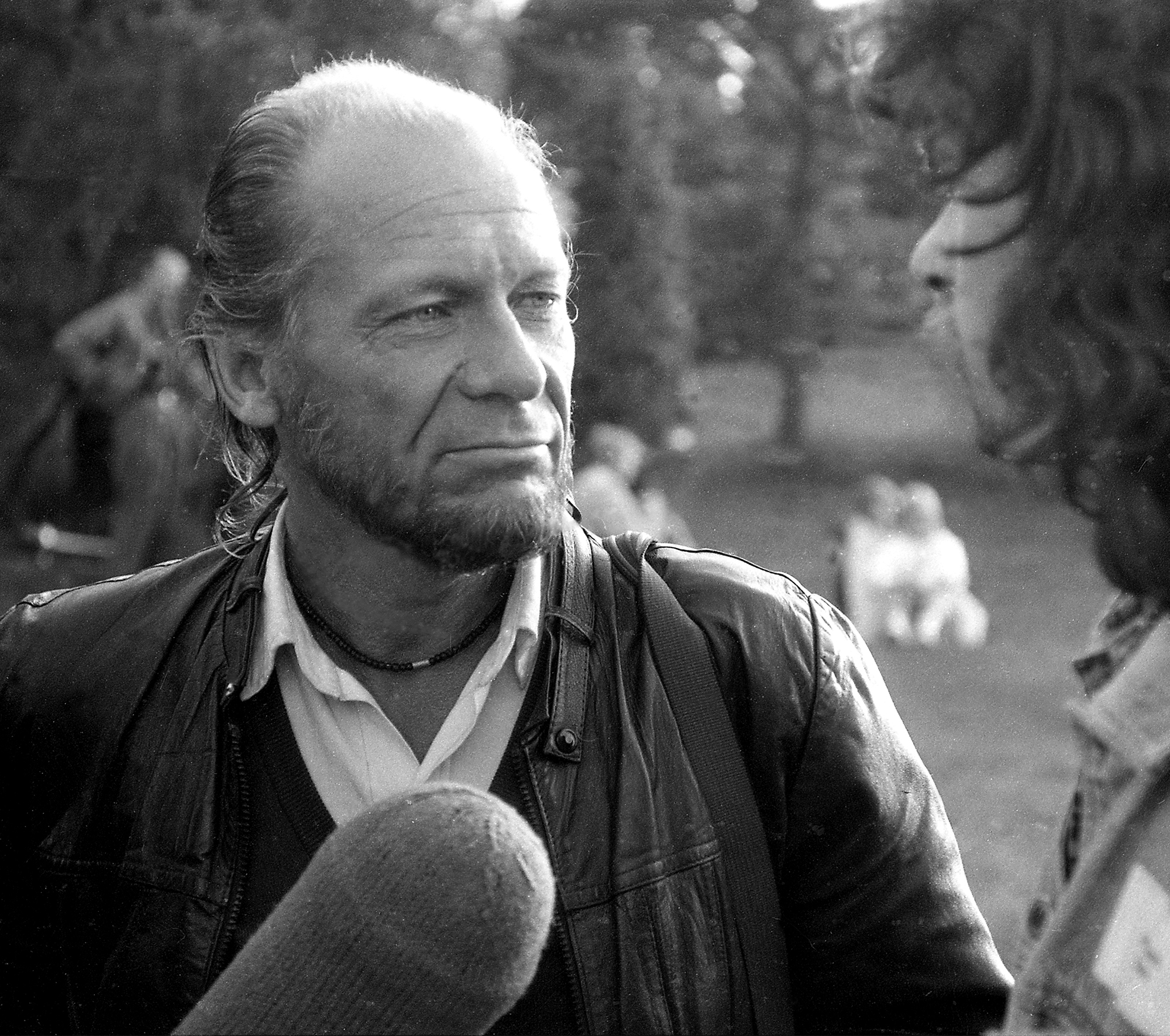
- Photo of Tooming in 1989 by Jaan Kynnap
- Born: 1 June 1939; Rakvere, Estonia
- Died: 17 May 1997 (aged 57); Tallinn, Estonia
- Resting place: Metsakalmistu
- Education: University of Tartu
- Occupations: Photographer; Photojournalist; Documentary film director; Journalist

Peeter Tooming (1 June 1939 – 17 May 1997) was an Estonian photographer, photojournalist, documentary film director and journalist.

== Biography ==
Tooming was born 1 June 1939 in Rakvere, Estonia.

In 1974, he graduated from Tartu State University with a degree in journalism. From 1961 until 1994, he was an operator and director at Tallinnfilm.

He organised over 120 photo exhibitions, and participated in over 300 international photo exhibitions. He was one of the founders of the photo artist collectives "Stodom" (1964) and "O" (1985).

He died on 17 May 1997 in Tallinn.

== Awards ==
- 1988: Estonian SSR merited artistic personnel

== Filmography ==
- Koduküla (1969, with Peep Puks)
- Aastad (1977)
- Kitseküla (1993)

== Gallery ==
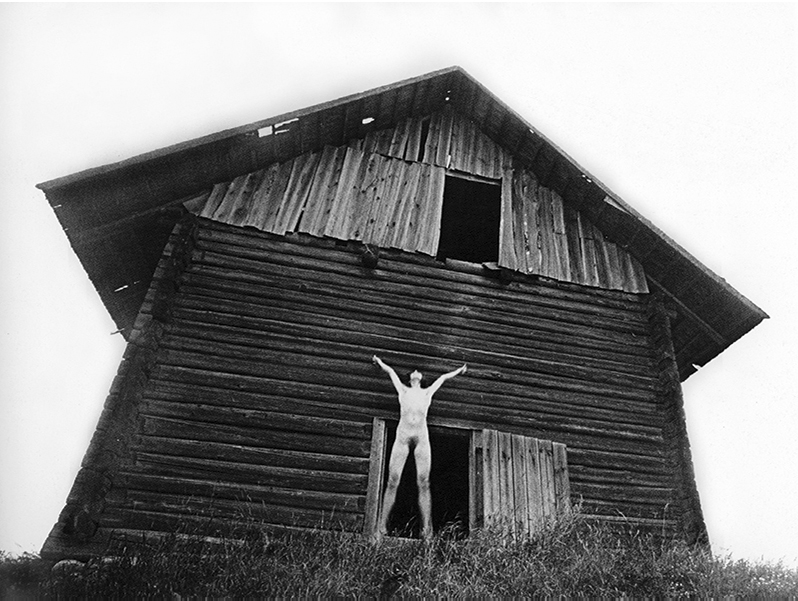
"Miks" (1970)

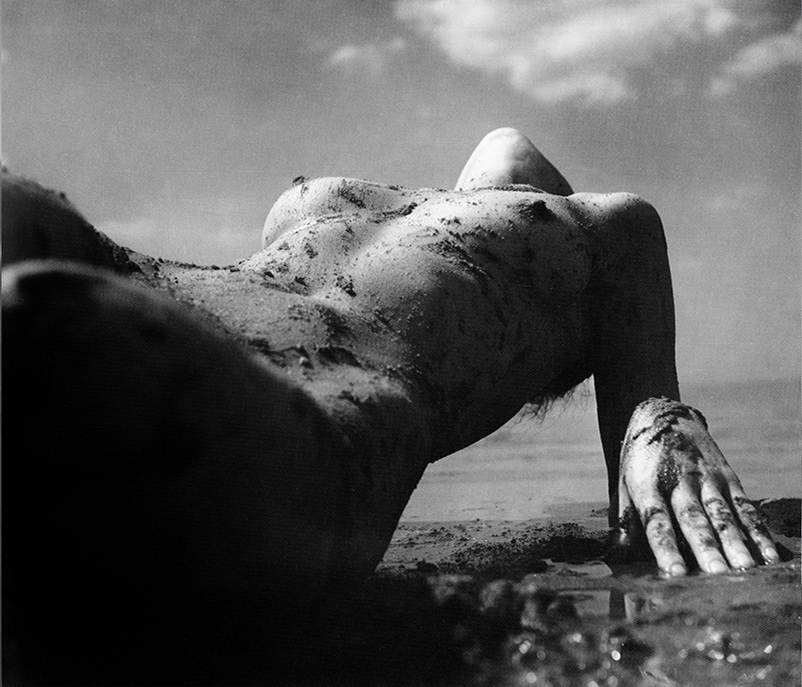
"Kaldal II" (1973)

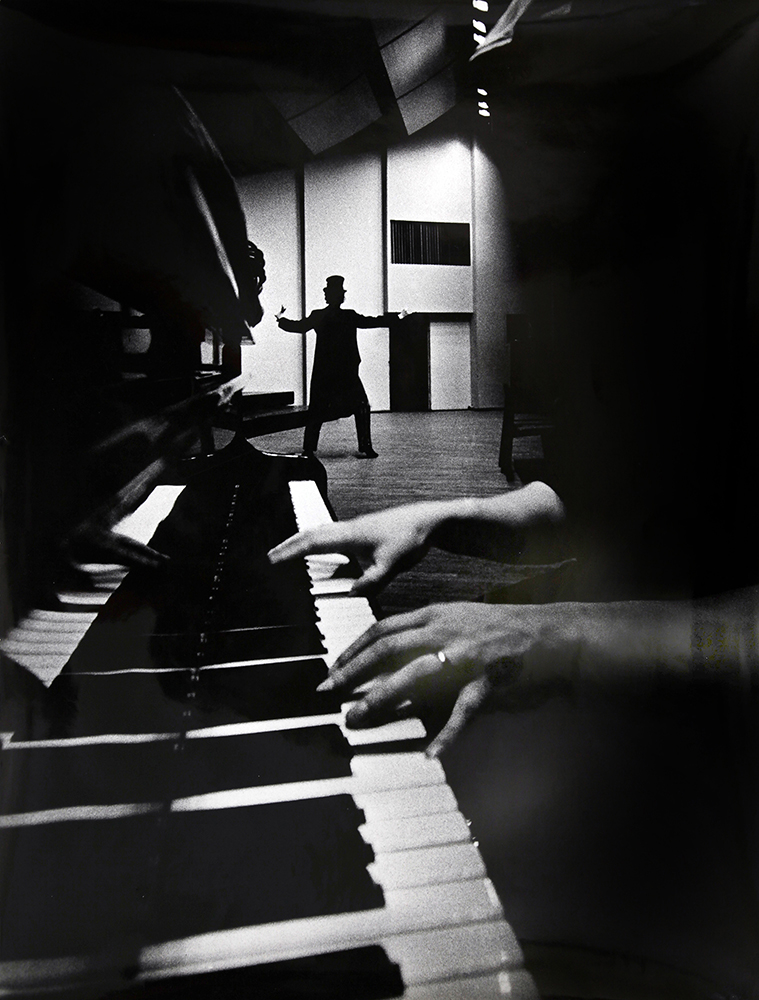
"Tants pärast õhtusööki" (1974)

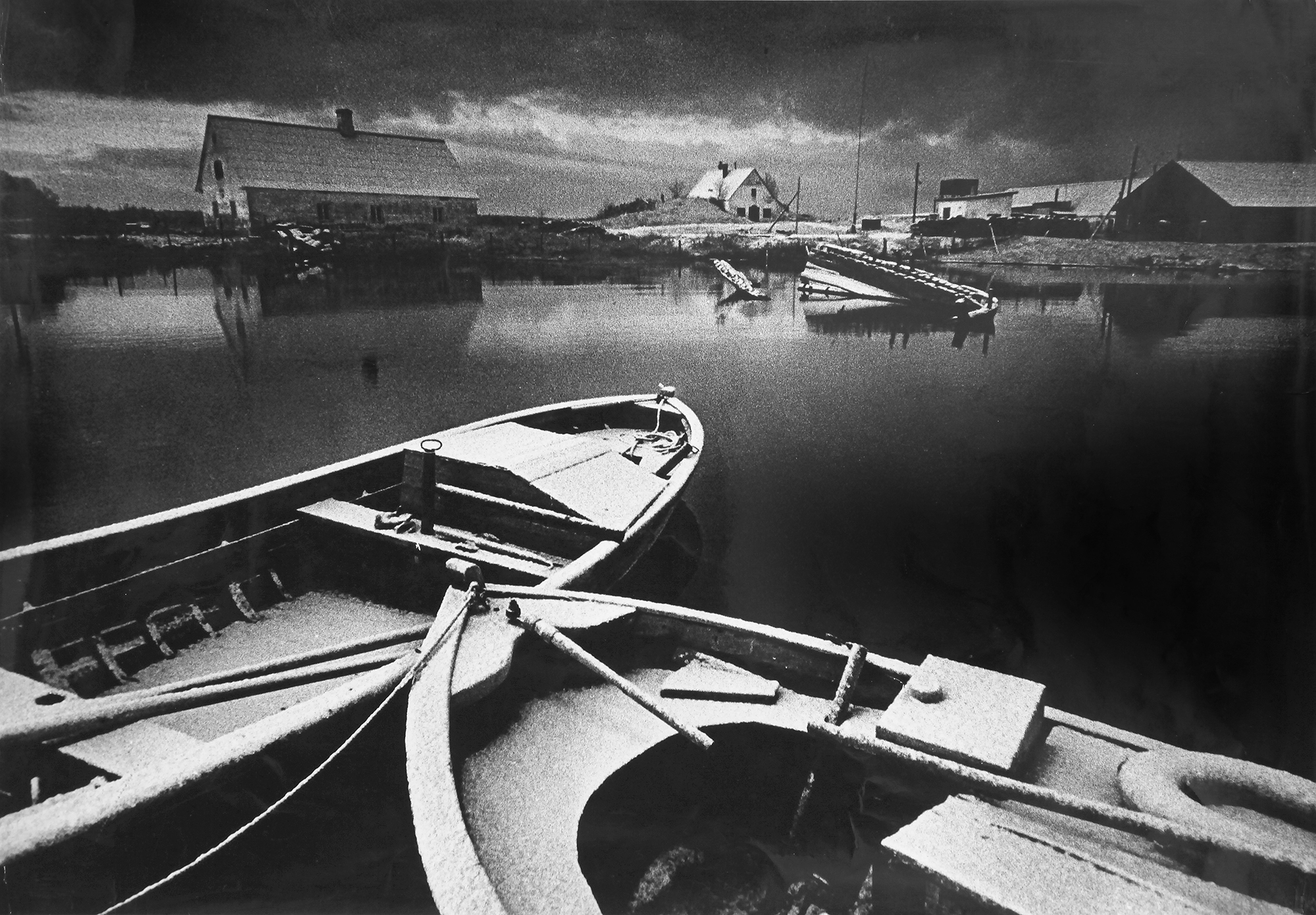
"Paadid" (1976)

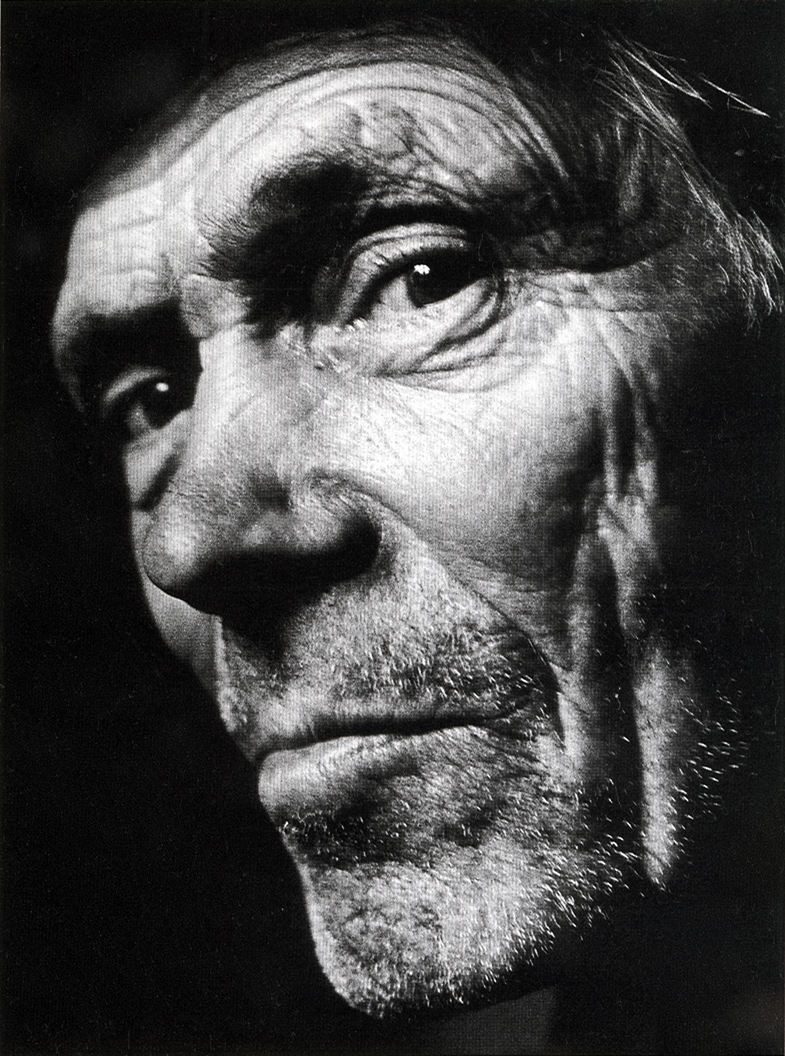
"Mees" (1977)

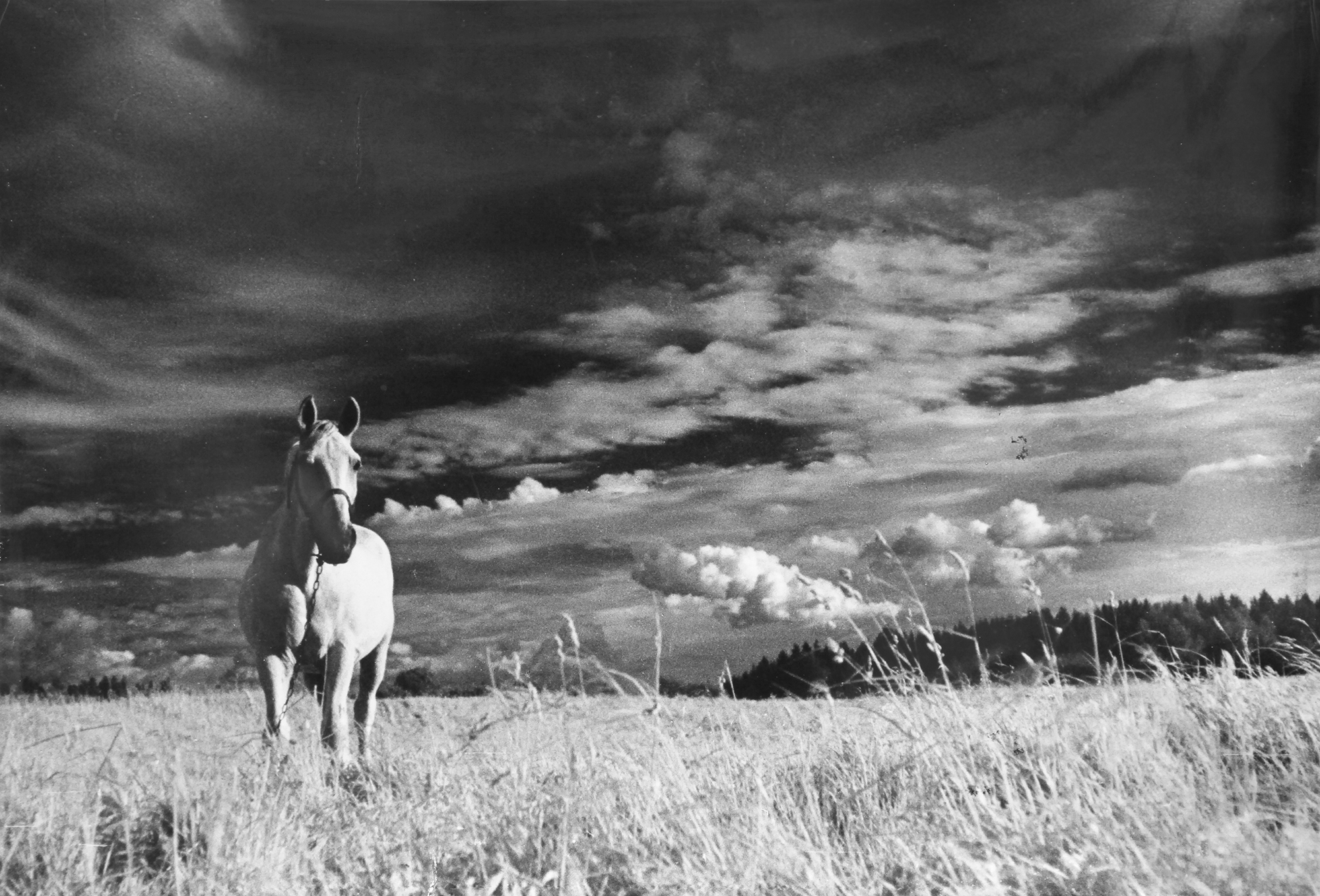
"Valge hobune" (1977)
