= Peeter Kaldur =

Estonian clergyman (born 1954)

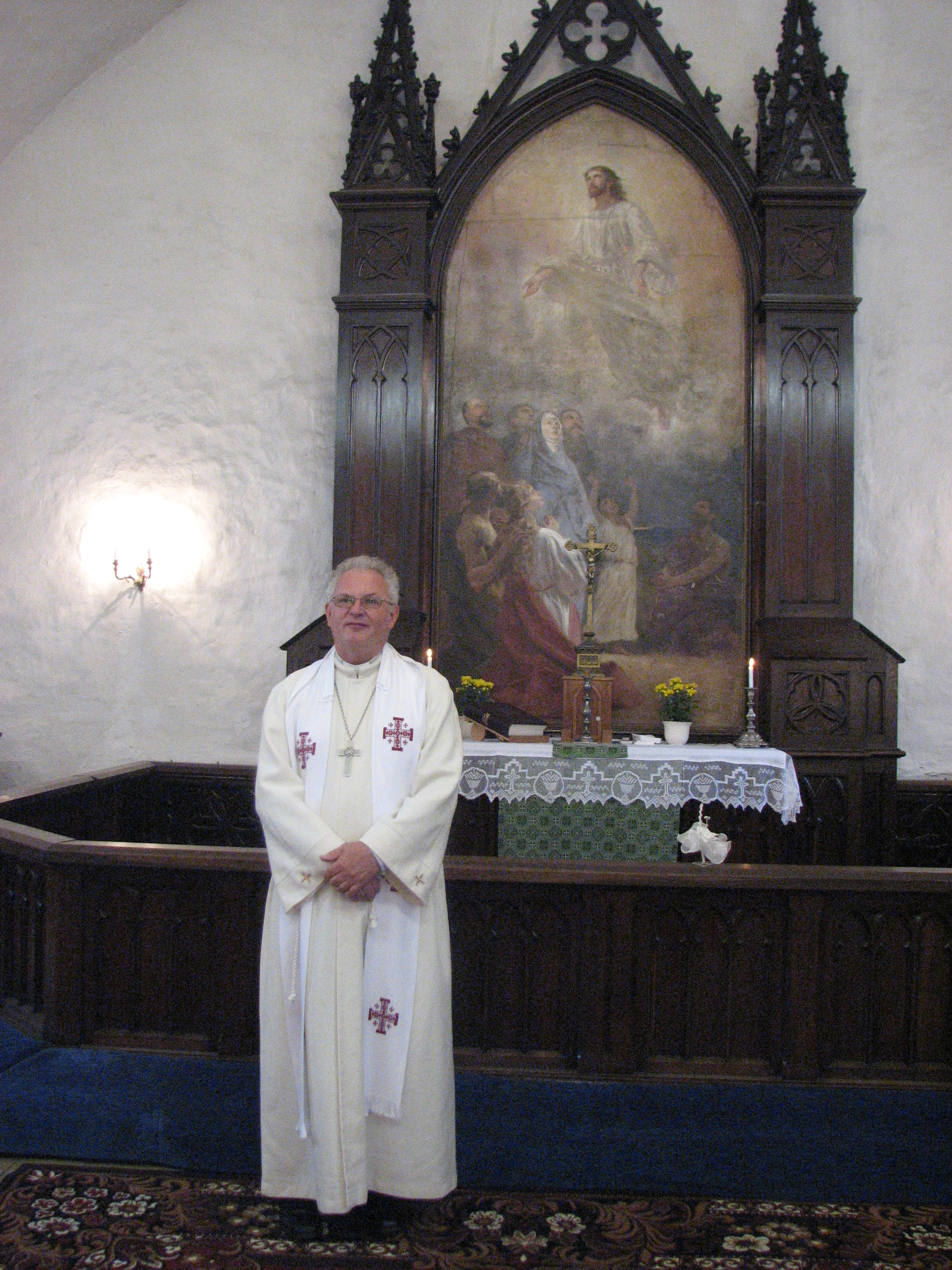
Peeter Kaldur in 2007.

Peeter Kaldur (born 20 May 1954 in Viljandi) is an Estonian Lutheran clergyman.

He was a member of Congress of Estonia.

Kaldur graduated from the Institute of Theology of the Estonian Evangelical Lutheran Church in 1980. He has been the provost of Virumaa.

In 2007, he was awarded with Order of the White Star, IV class.
