= Peeter van Loon =

Flemish painter (c.1600–1660)

- Born: c.1600 Antwerp
- Died: 1660 (aged 59–60); Antwerp
- Occupation: Baroque painter
- Known for: historical allegories
- Parents: Guillaume van Loon (father); Margrita Ingenhave (mother)

Peeter van Loon (c.1600–1660) was a Flemish Baroque painter.

According to Houbraken who quoted Cornelis De Bie, he was good at painting perspective and buildings. He was born and died in Antwerp in the 17th century, but died before De Bie's book was written in 1662.

According to the Netherlands Institute for Art History he was the son of the painter Guillaume van Loon and Margrita Ingenhave. In 1652 and 1660, he is registered as a bachelor, and is known for historical allegories. He was mentioned in the Antwerp Liggeren as the recipient of a 1638 church payment.
