= Pieter Jan Snyers =

Flemish painter (1696–1757)

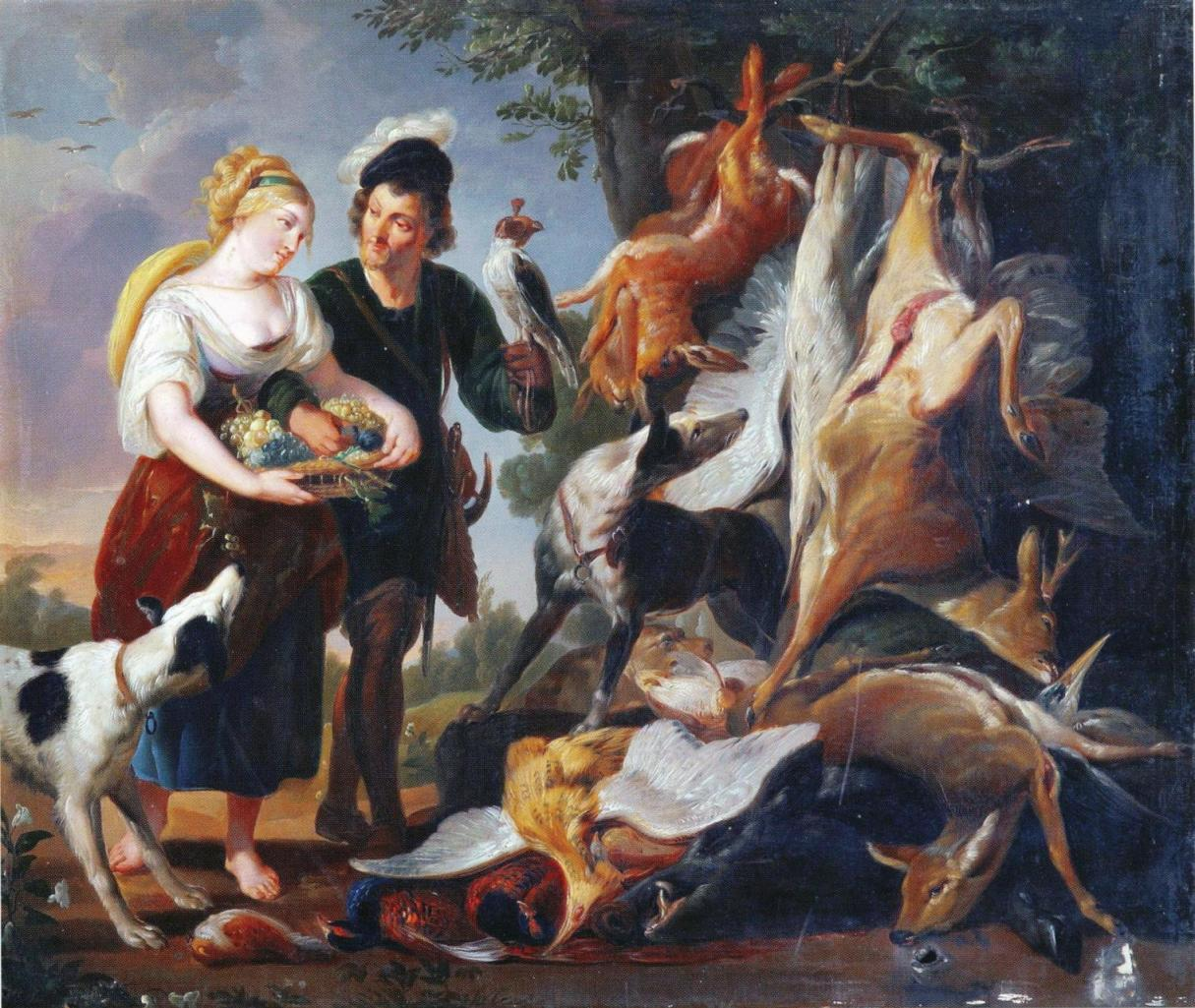
Still life of game with a couple of lovers

Pieter Jan Snyers or Petrus Johannes Snijers, first name also 'Peeter Johannes' (Antwerp, 1696 – Antwerp, 21 September 1757) was a Flemish painter. He is known for his still life paintings with game.

== Life ==
Pieter Jan Snyers was born in Antwerp. He was the nephew of Pieter Snyers who was his teacher. He was registered as a pupil of Pieter Snyers at the Antwerp Guild of Saint Luke in 1712–13. He was not registered as master at the guild as he was an amateur painter. He served five times as the deacon of the Guild.

When his uncle Pieter Snyers died in 1752, Pieter Jan inherited his large collection of art which included works of major artists of the preceding century. As heir to his considerable art collection which was fairly well documented, Snyers' name regularly appears as one of the names in the provenance of Flemish and Dutch master paintings.

He died in Antwerp.

== Work ==
As Pieter Jan Snyers was likely not a professional painter his works are very scarce. His subjects were hunting scenes and in particular small sized ones.
