= Peep Jöffert =

Estonian racing cyclist (1944–2024)

Personal information
- Born: 29 October 1944 Kose, German-occupied Lithuania
- Died: 4 March 2024 (aged 79)

Cycling career
- Sport: Cycling

Peep Jöffert (Russian: Пеп Ифферт; 29 October 1944 – 4 March 2024) was an Estonian racing cyclist.

== Biography ==
Born in Kose on 29 October 1944, Jöffert joined the USSR men's national cycling team and earned several victories throughout his career. He notably won Stage 4 of the 1968 Tour de l'Avenir and won a "purple jersey" in that year's Peace Race.

Peep Jöffert died on 4 March 2024, at the age of 79.

== Awards ==
- 5th in the UCI Road World Championships – Men's team time trial (1966)
- 53rd in the Tour de l'Avenir (1966)
- Winner of the Stages 4 and 6 of the Tour of Sweden (1967)
- 3rd in the Estonian National Road Race Championships Time Trials (1967)
- Winner of Stage 4 of the Tour de l'Avenir (1968)
- 17th in the Tour de l'Avenir (1968)
- 29th in the Peace Race (1968)
