= Viljar Peep =

Estonian historian and civil servant (born 1969)

Viljar Peep (born 9 June 1969 in Tartu) is an Estonian historian and civil servant.

From 2008 to 2018, he was the head of Estonian Data Protection Inspection (Estonian: Andmekaitse Inspektsioon).

In 2008, he was awarded with Order of the White Star, V class.
