= Peeter Mardna =

Estonian rower, coach, sport personnel, and physician

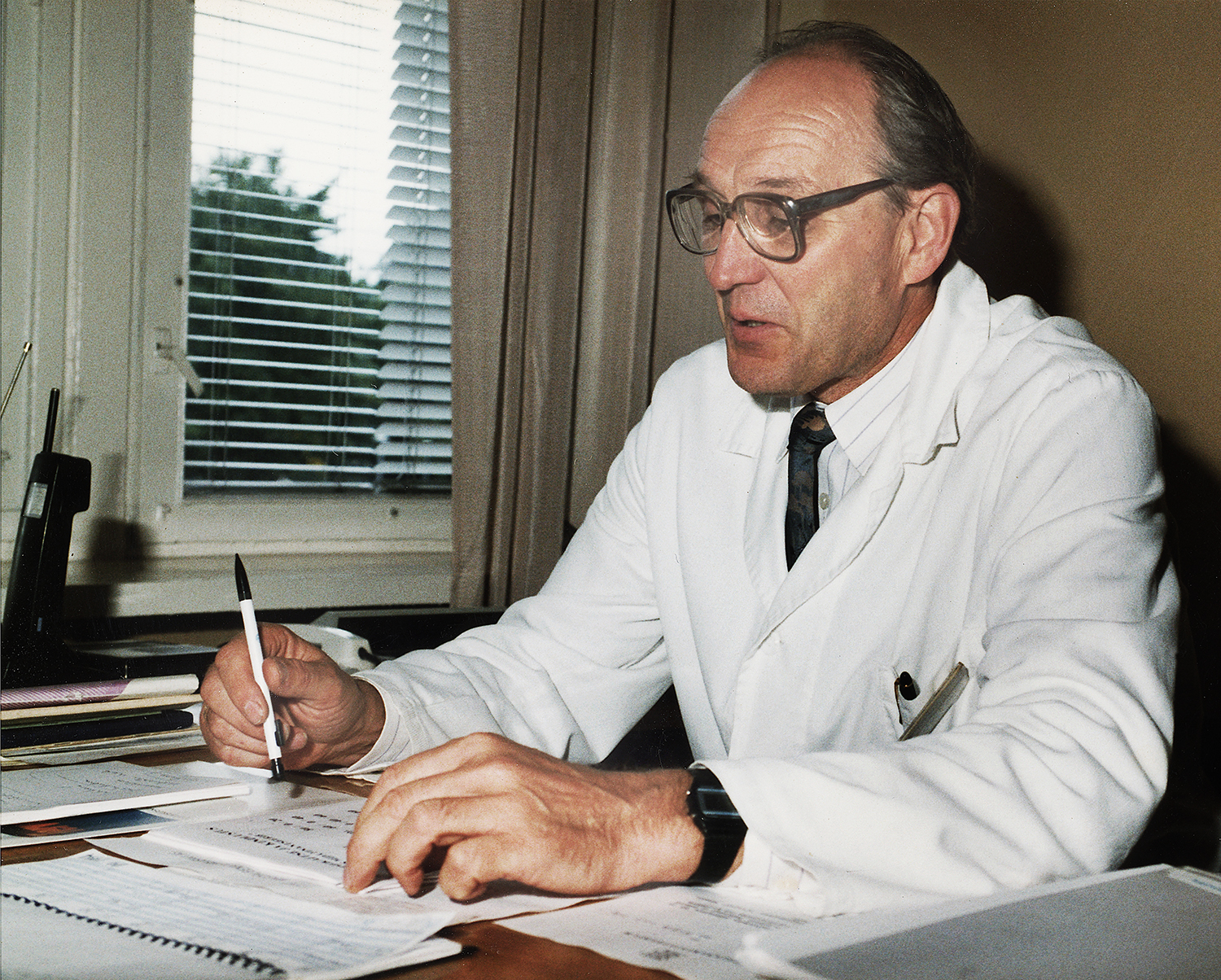
Peeter Mardna

Peeter Mardna (born on 24 October 1938 Tallinn) is an Estonian rower, coach, sport personnel and physician.

In 1966 he graduated from Tartu State University's department of medicine.

In 1969 he won Moscow Regatta (two-boat discipline). From 1960 to 1971 he became the 9-time Estonian champion in different rowing disciplines.

He was a rowing coach at the Moscow and Seoul Olympic Games and at the 1995 World Rowing Championships.

From 1992 to 2001 he was a member of Estonian Olympic Committee. From 1991 to 2001 he was the president of the Estonian Rowing Federation.

== Awards ==
- 2002 – Order of the Estonian Red Cross, IV class.
- 2014 – Order of Merit of Tallinn
- 2015 – Tartu University Hospital Award
- 2018 – Estonian Olympic Committee Medal of Merit
- 2020 – Sports Award of the Republic of Estonia (Lifetime Achievement Award - former athlete, judge, sports doctor and advocate for sports integrity)
- 2025 – Tallinn Medical Association Lifetime Achievement Award
