= Peep Sürje =

Estonian civil engineer (1945–2013)

Peep Sürje (19 April 1945 Rakvere – 12 May 2013 Tallinn) was an Estonian civil engineer specializing in road engineering, soil mechanics and geotechnics (mechanical compaction of soil, embankments on weak substrates).

In 1973, he graduated from Tallinn Polytechnical Institute in technical sciences (cum laude). In 1984, he graduated from the State Road Research Institute in Moscow. Since 1992, he is professor of roads' engineering.

From 2005 until 2010, he was the rector of Tallinn University of Technology and a professor emeritus of the institute in 2012.

In 2011, he was awarded with Order of the White Star, III class.
