= Pieter Snyers =

Flemish painter

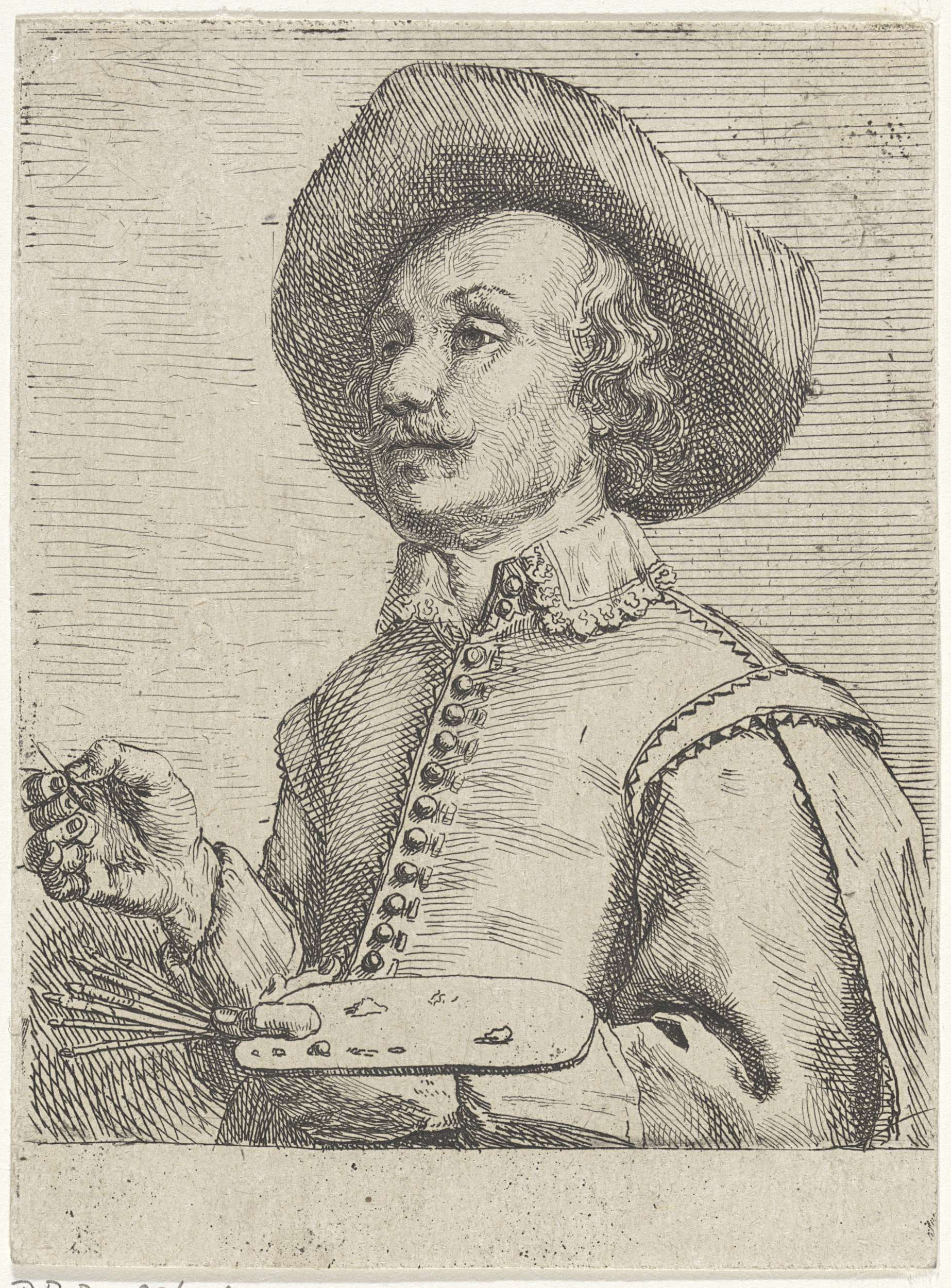
'Peter Snyers self-portrait

Pieter Snyers or Peter Snijers (first name also written as: 'Peeter' and nickname 'De Heilige' or 'The Holy One') (30 March 1681 – 4 May 1752) was a Flemish art collector, painter, draughtsman and engraver. He practised a wide variety of genres, including portraits, genre painting, still life and landscape painting. His masterpiece is a series of 12 paintings, each representing a different month of the year.

== Life ==
Pieter Snyers was born in Antwerp as the son of well-off merchant Peter and his wife Anna de Decker. He studied under Alexander van Bredael in 1694. He was registered as a master of the Antwerp Guild of Saint Luke in 1707.

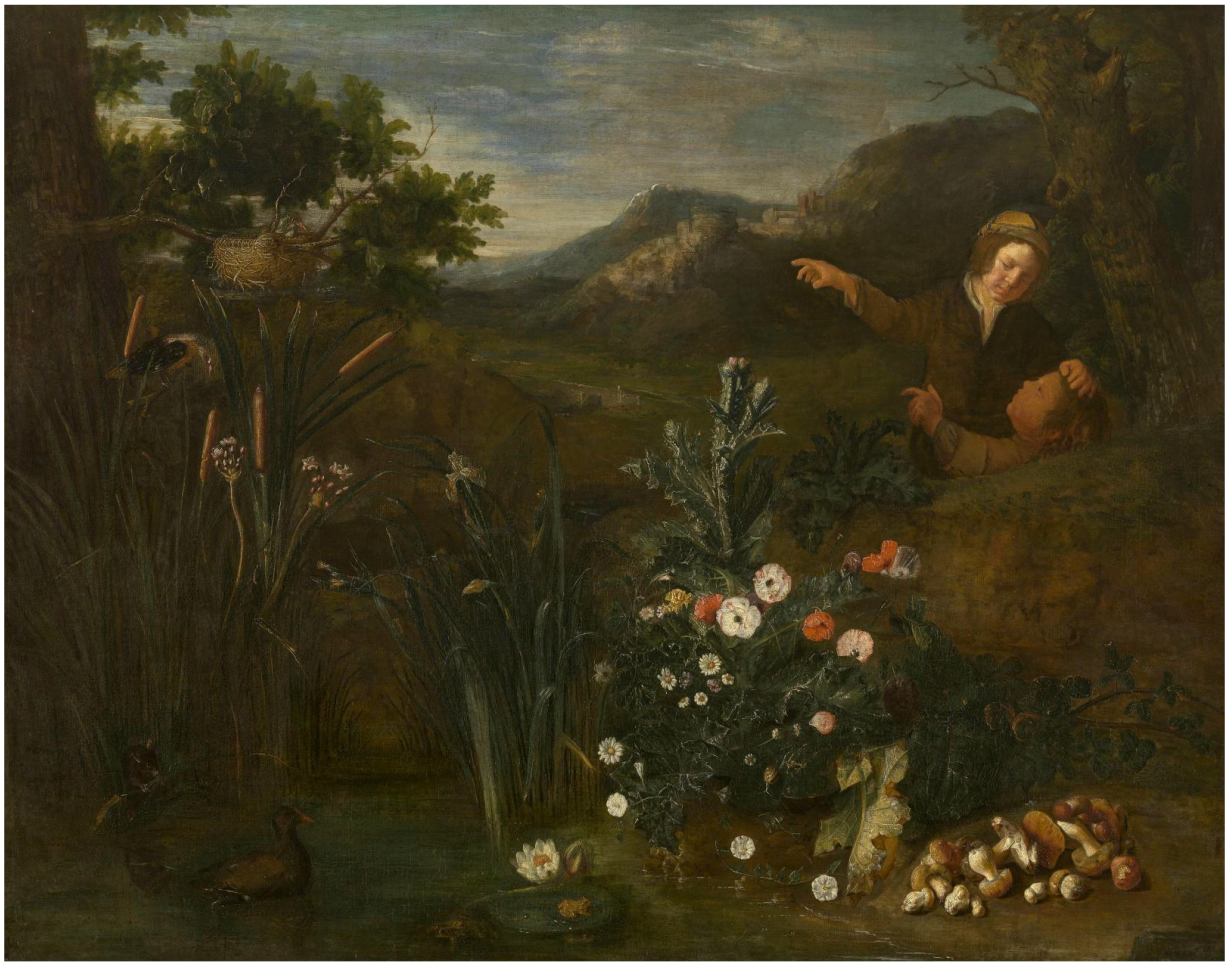
The bird's nest

He is reported to have resided in London in the period from 1720 to 1726, where he painted portraits of various members of the nobility and clergymen. The artist who principally painted portraits of priests or monks, led such a calm and pious lifestyle that he was given the nickname De Heilige or The Holy One. He married Maria Catharina van der Boven, the daughter of a lawyer, in 1726. This marriage produced no issue. He was successful as an artist, and able to buy a house on the prestigious Meir in Antwerp and assemble a large collection of Flemish and Dutch masters there.

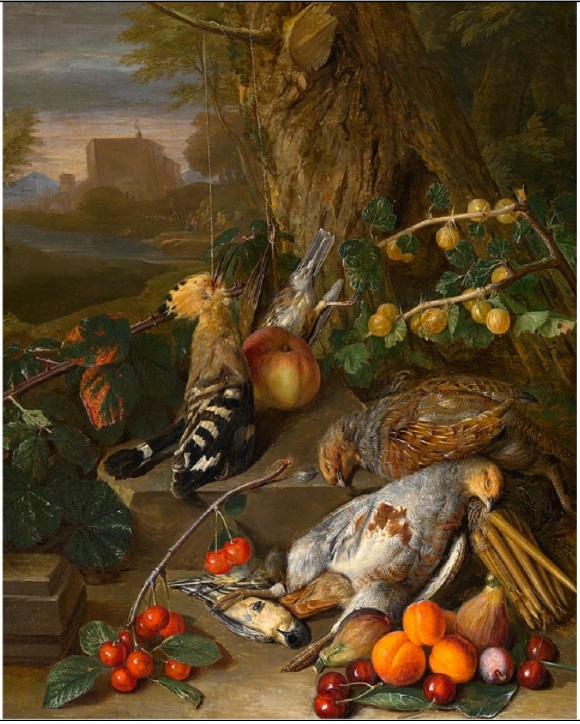
Still life with dead game

He entered on 17 August 1741 into an agreement with five other artists to provide free tuition as the directors of the Antwerp Academy. The academy would eventually replace the Guild of Saint Luke.

Snyers died in Antwerp. His estate included a large collection of art works of major artists of the preceding century showing that he was well-off. His nephew and pupil Pieter Jan Snyers was heir to his considerable fortune.

Snyers was the teacher of his nephew Pieter Jan Snyers and Jacob Xavier Vermoelen.

== Work ==
Snyers was a versatile artist who painted in many genres including portraits, genre paintings, landscapes, still lifes, flower pieces, animal paintings, fruit pieces, game pieces, vegetable still lifes and plants. He painted both on large canvases and small copper plates. He was said never to have painted a composition twice.

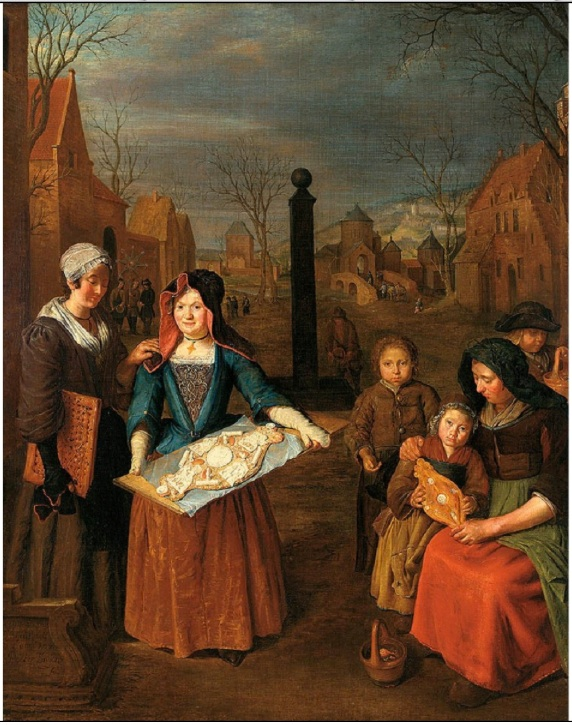
Aquarius or the month of January

Snyers painted a series of 12 paintings, each representing a different month of the year. This series is regarded as the masterpiece of the artist and never left his studio during his lifetime. The paintings were dispersed in 1763 when they were auctioned off. Two of the paintings (January and July) are now in the Royal Museum of Fine Arts in Antwerp and two (April and May) in the Royal Museums of Fine Arts of Belgium in Brussels. Another two, those for March and December, were auctioned by Christie's (New York, 29 January 1998, lot 3). There is a reduced copy of the month of March in the Rijksmuseum in Amsterdam. The paintings in the series are genre paintings which include a representation of each month by its astrological sign. The painting of the month of January in the Royal Museum of Fine Arts, Antwerp depicts three Epiphany singers with a big star and a few women and children with special cakes, particular to the winter season, together with a man pouring water who symbolises Aquarius, the astrological sign of January. The painting series may, directly or indirectly, have inspired Pieter Casteels III and Jacob van Huysum to produce a series of paintings of the 12 months.

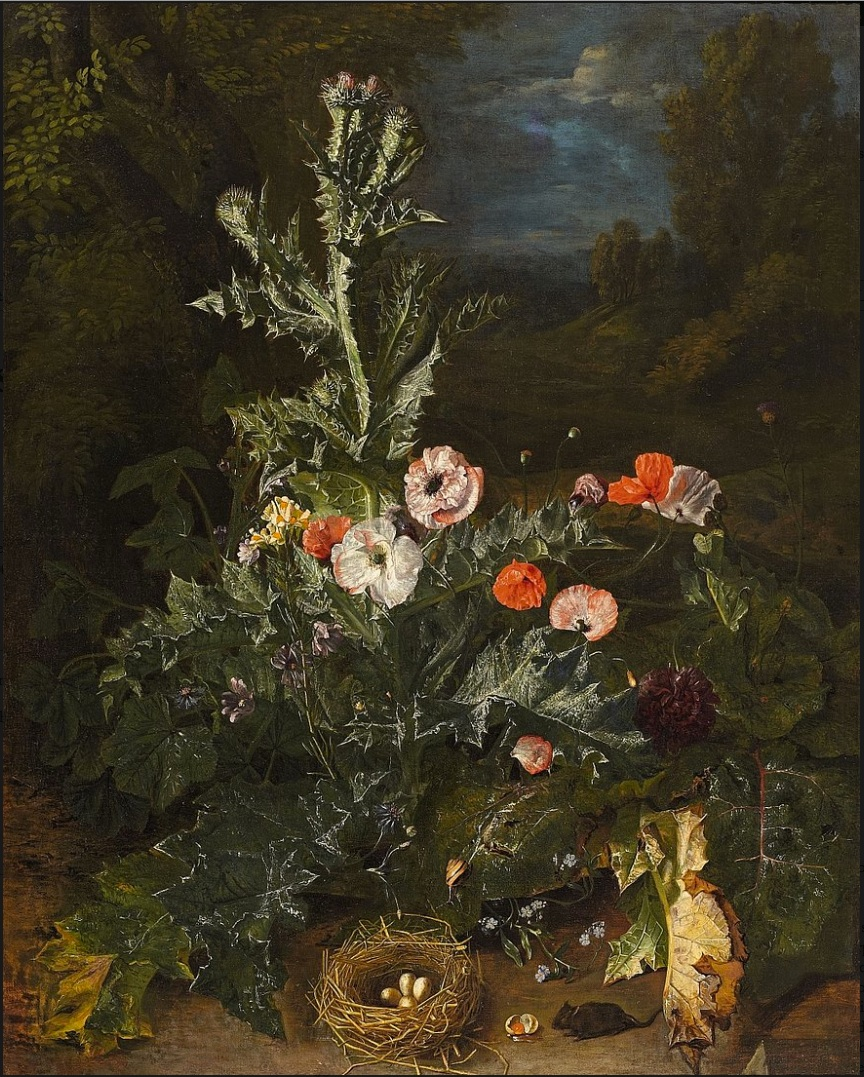
Still life with tistle and nest

His still lifes include outdoor settings with dead game and forest floors and indoor compositions with a profusion of small objects, fruits, single blossoms, nuts and other objects scattered across a surface.

Snyers was also an engraver. The British Museum holds a charming portrait of a sleeping boy by Snyers. He also produced an etched self-portrait (Rijksmuseum Amsterdam).
