= Bo Peep =

Bo Peep most often refers to:

- Little Bo-Peep, an English-language nursery rhyme

Bo Peep, Bo-Peep, or Bopeep may also refer to:

- Bo Peep (Toy Story), a character in the Toy Story franchise
- Bo Peep, Victoria, Australia
- "Bo Peep Bo Peep", a 2009 song by South Korean girl group T-ara
- BoPeep Junction, on the Hastings line, a railway line in Kent and East Sussex, England
- Bulverhythe or Bo Peep, a suburb of Hastings, East Sussex, England
- Bopeep, a hamlet in the London Borough of Bromley, United Kingdom, between Chelsfield and Well Hill
