= Peeping Tom (disambiguation) =

A Peeping Tom is a nickname for a male voyeur, from the character Peeping Tom, who spied on the Lady Godiva's naked ride.

== Music ==
- Peeping Tom (band), a pop band formed by Mike Patton
  - Peeping Tom (Peeping Tom album), 2006
- Peeping Tom (S.E.X. Appeal album), 1985)
- "Peeping Tom", a song by Toots and the Maytals from the 1970 album Monkey Man
- "Peeping Tom", a song by Placebo from the 2000 album Black Market Music
- "Peeping Tom", a song by Rockwell from the 1985 film The Last Dragon

== Film ==
- Peeping Tom (1897 film), an American short comedy-drama film
- Peeping Tom (1960 film), a British horror film directed by Michael Powell
- Peeping Tom (1973 film), an American pornographic film directed by Ray Dennis Steckler

== Other ==
- Peeping Tom (magazine), a British small press magazine
- Peeping Tom, a novel by Howard Jacobson centering on the work of Thomas Hardy
- Peeping Tom (theatre company), a Belgian dance theatre company
