= Peter I Vanden Gheyn =

Bell maker (1500–1561)

Peter Vanden Gheyn (Dutch: Peeter Vanden Gheÿn or Dutch: Ghein; 1500–1561) was a bell-founder of the Spanish Netherlands (now Belgium).

== Life ==
Peter was the son of Willem van den Ghein, who established himself as a bellfounder at Mechelen in 1506. Peter followed his father into the trade, establishing his own foundry in 1528. His estate was known as De Swaene or De Swane.

He cast peal, table, and clock bells, but was most famed for the skill exhibited in his large bells. He is thought to have cast the bell of the Mary Rose. Another of his bells hangs at St Peter's College, Cambridge.

His two sons Peter and Jan both joined the family business.
