= Pieter Verdussen =

Flemish painter and draftsman

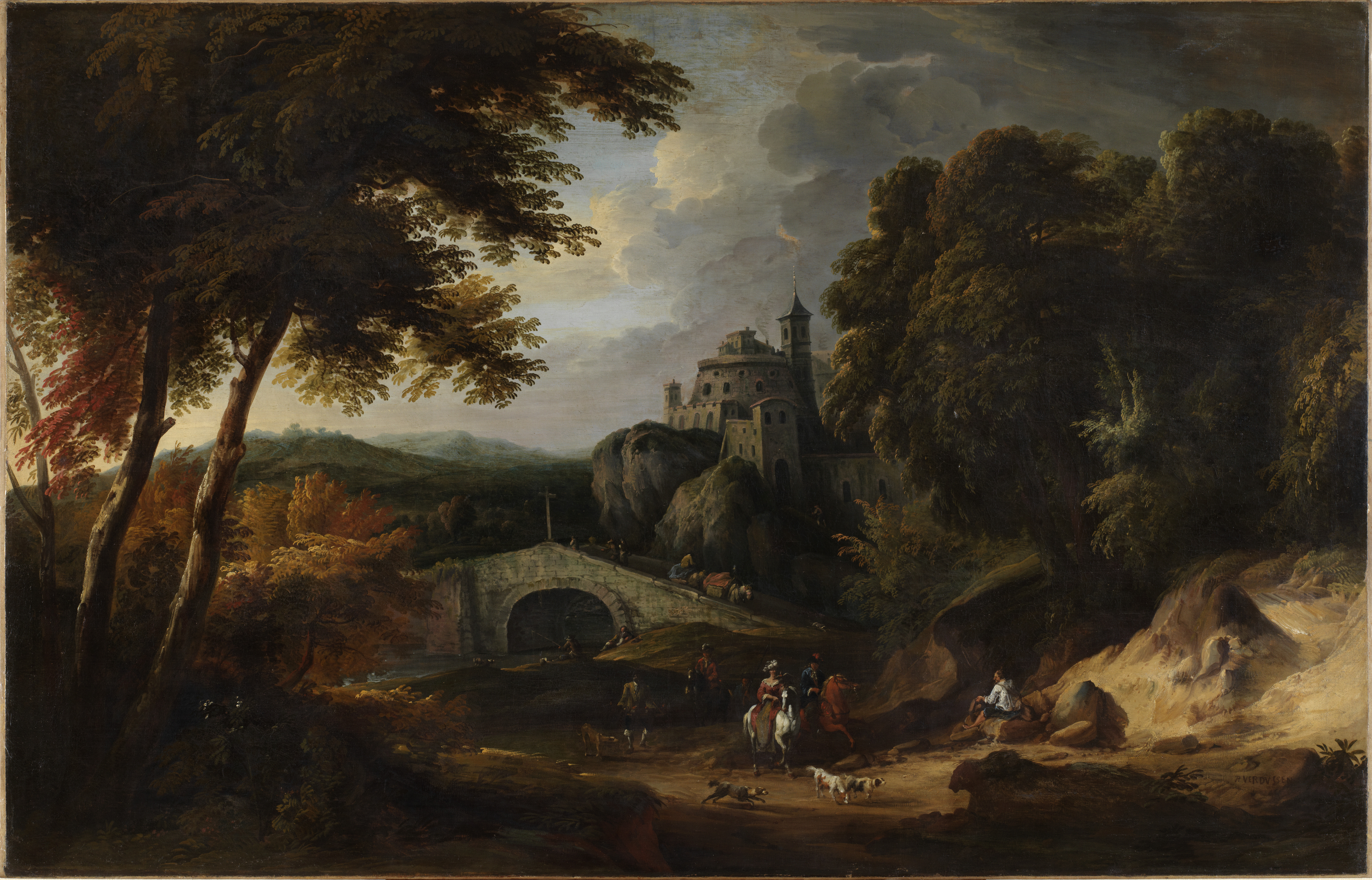
Landscape with bridge

Pieter Verdussen or Peeter Verdussen (Antwerp, baptized on 10 February 1662 – after 1710) was a Flemish painter and draftsman. He is known mainly for his battle scenes, equestrian paintings and landscapes.

== Life ==
Pieter Verdussen was born in Antwerp, where he was baptized on 10 February 1662. He was the son of the painter Jacob Verdussen and Maria Huysmans. He trained with his father, as did his sister Catharina. Pieter and Catherina continued working in their father's workshop after their training.

Pieter Verdussen married Elisabeth le Febure on 7 June 1692. The couple had several children. Their son Jan Peeter Verdussen trained with his father and became a battle painter like his father.

Pieter Verdussen was admitted as a master painter of the Antwerp Guild of Saint Luke in 1697. His sister Catharina became a master of the Guild in the same year.

The date and place of death of Pieter Verdussen are not known. He is believed to have died between 1710 and 1730.

== Work ==
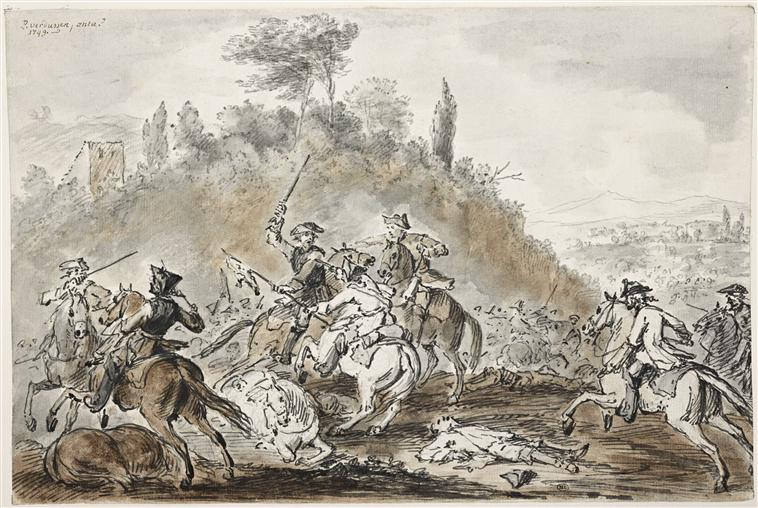
Equestrian battle

Pieter Verdussen painted mainly battle scenes, equestrian paintings and landscapes. Only a few works are attributed to him.

Verdussen painted two versions of a battle painting depicting the Battle of Ekeren, a battle of the War of the Spanish Succession, which took place on 30 June 1703. One version is in the Royal Museum of Fine Arts Antwerp and the other in the Antwerp City Hall. In the Plantin-Moretus Museum in Antwerp there is an example of a landscape entitled Landscape with bridge in which the landscape is by the hand of Verdussen and the figures by Jasper Broers. A hunting scene has also been attributed to him.

The styles of Verdussen and that of his son Jan Peeter were close to each other and show the influence of, amongst others, the Flemish battle painter Adam Frans van der Meulen and the Dutch battle painter Philips Wouwerman.
