= Jan Peeter Verdussen =

Flemish painter, draftsman and printmaker

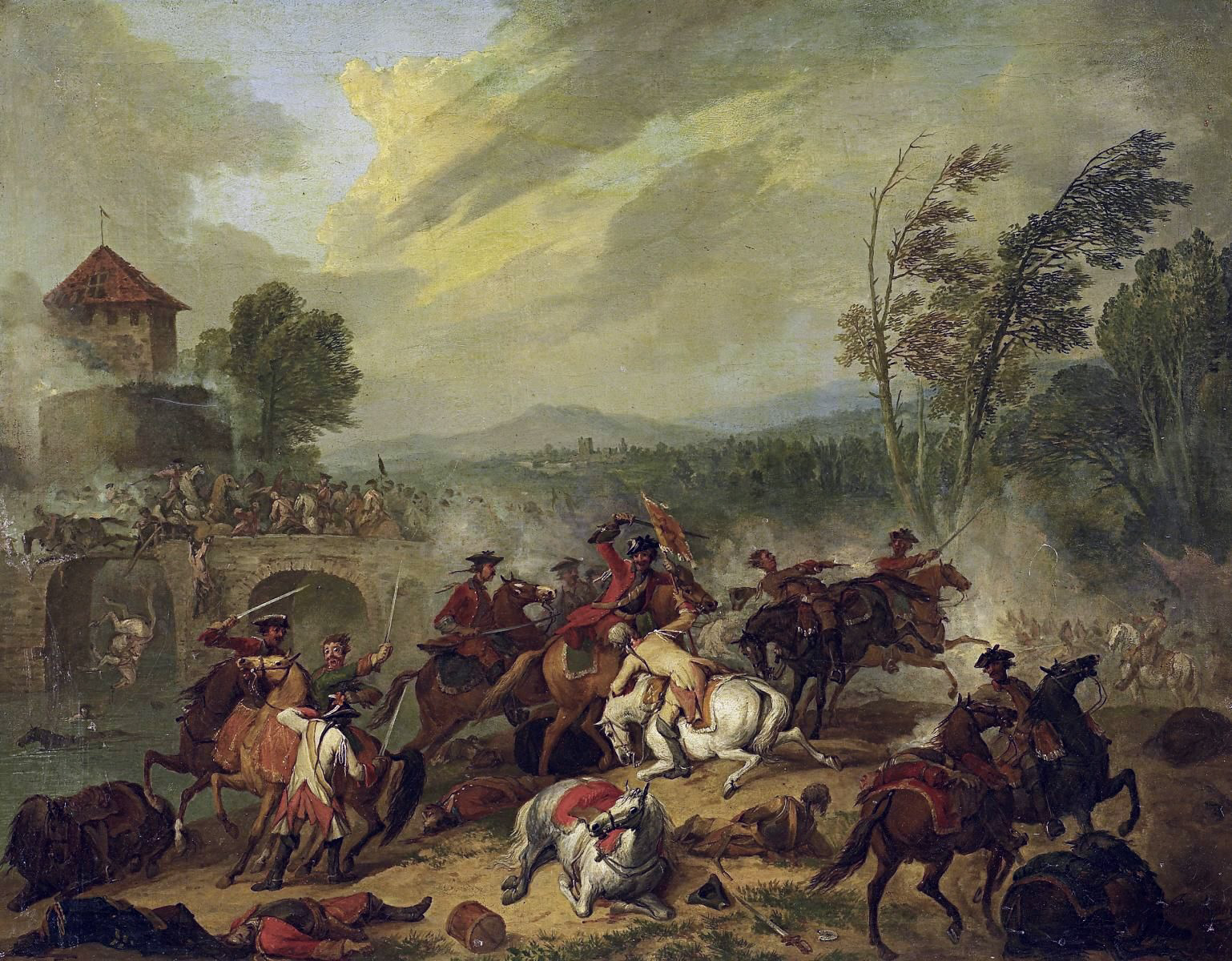
Cavalry battle at a bridge

Jan Peeter Verdussen or Jan Pieter Verdussen (Antwerp, c. 1700 - Avignon, 31 March 1763) was a Flemish painter, draftsman and printmaker. He is known mainly for his battle scenes, incidents of camp life and equestrian paintings. He also painted landscapes with hunting scenes, gallant companies and genre scenes of markets.

== Life ==
Jan Peeter Verdussen is believed to have been born around 1700, likely in Antwerp, as the son of Pieter (Peeter) Verdussen and Elisabeth le Febure. His father was a battle painter, who was the son of the painter Jacob Verdussen and had become a master of the Guild of Saint Luke of Antwerp in 1697. Chatharina Verdussen, the aunt of Jan Peeter Verdussen, also was a painter.

Little is known about his training and period of activity in Antwerp. He is believed to have trained with his father. He left Antwerp and arrived in Turin on 31 March 1743. He had been called there to become the court painter of Charles Emmanuel III of Sardinia, the King of Sardinia. He accompanied the king during his military campaigns and made paintings of what he witnessed. Verdussen remained in Turin until 28 February 1746.

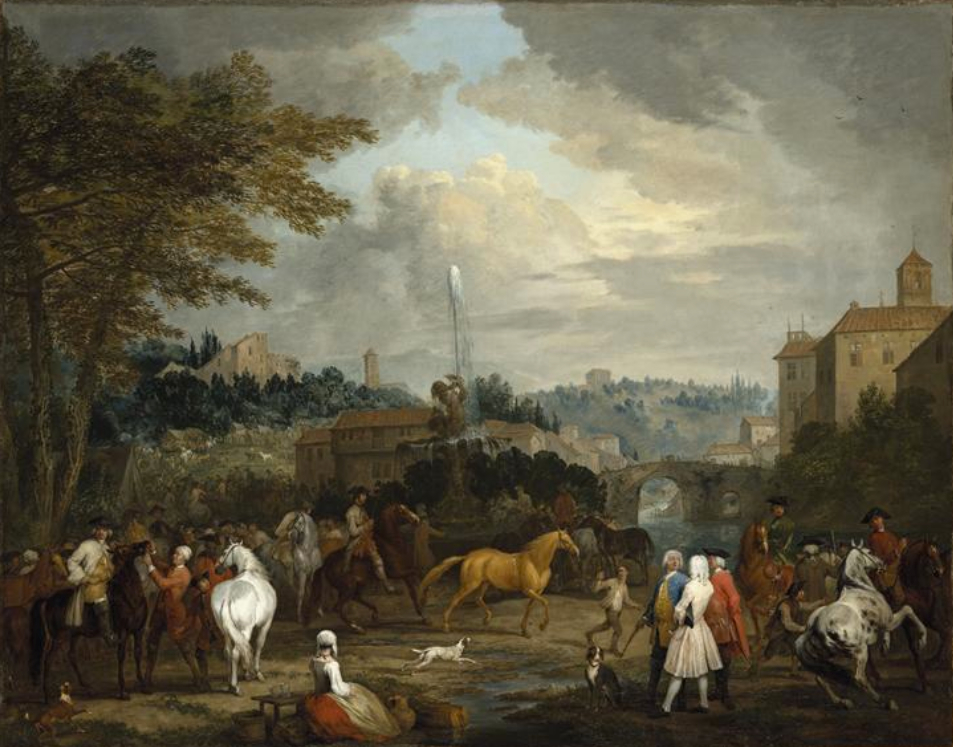
Horse market

Jan Peeter Verdussen subsequently moved to France. He likely travelled to Rome some time after his departure from Turin and before moving to France. He is first recorded in Marseille in 1744. He was active in Marseille where in 1759 he became a member and later a director of the local Academy. He was later in Avignon, where he died on 31 March 1763.

== Work ==
Jan Peeter Verdussen painted mainly battle scenes, incidents of camp life and equestrian paintings. He also painted landscapes with hunting scenes and gallant companies. He painted a few genre scenes. The chronology of his work is not well established.

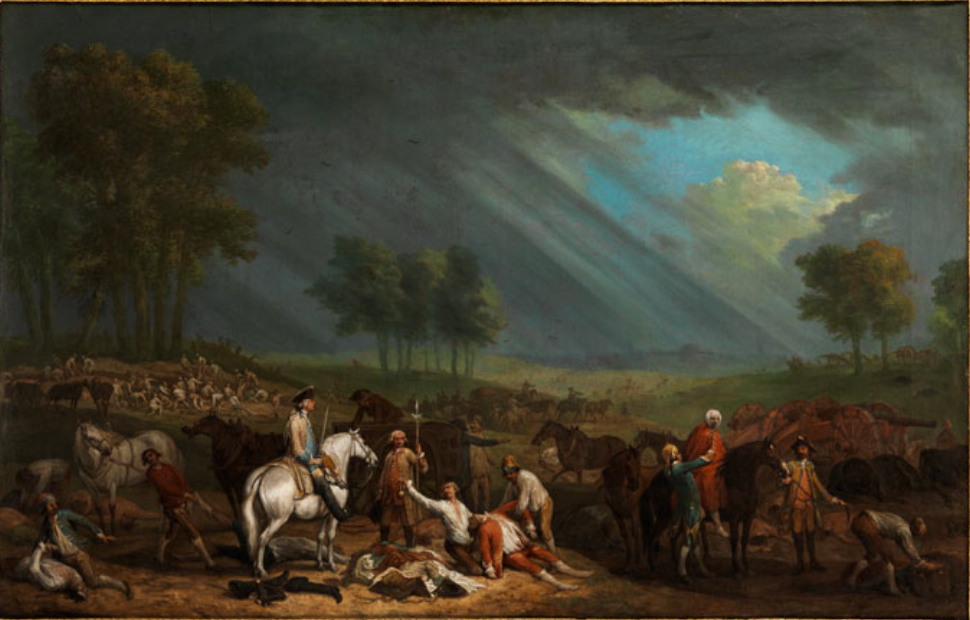
During the battle

Verdussen's style was eclectic. He was influenced by the leading Dutch battle painter Philips Wouwerman. At the same time his work showed the influence of the Bamboccianti, the Dutch and Flemish genre painters of low life themes active in Rome in the 17th century. Other influences were the French rococo painter Nicolas Lancret and battle scenes by the Flemish battle painter Adam Frans van der Meulen who was active in France and his pupil the French painter Jean-Baptiste Martin.

While some of Verdussen's battle scenes are generic and do not depict a particular battle, a number of his paintings illustrate historical battles of his time. During his residence in Turin as the court painter of Charles Emmanuel III of Sardinia he was commissioned to depict the victories of his patron. He thus painted a number of renderings of the Battle of Guastalla. These works decorated in 1745 the Battle Gallery in the Royal Palace in Turin. Subsequently, these works were erroneously attributed to Hyacynthe de La Pegna, a Flemish battle painter from Brussels, who was a court painter in Turin at the same time as Verdussen. Later the payment receipts for the paintings were rediscovered and proved that they were painted by Verdussen. The two paintings representing the Battle of Guastalla were probably executed in 1743 and are now in the Sabauda Gallery in Turin.

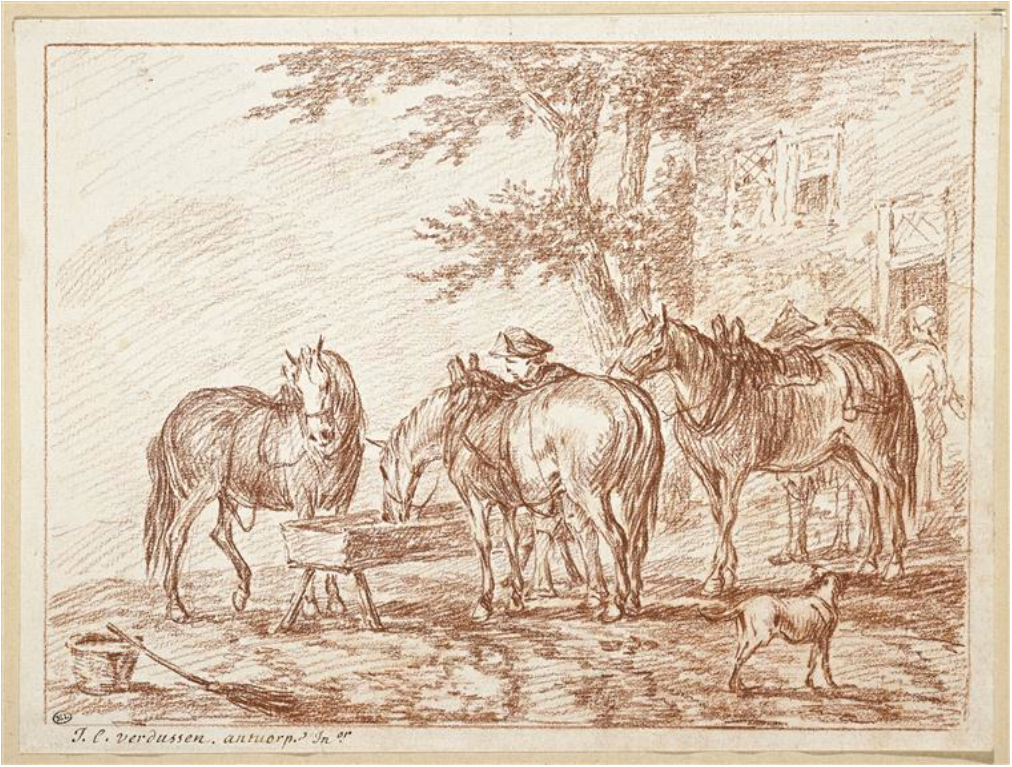
Three peasants leaving their horses to go to the hostel

Verdussen painted a number of genre scenes. Example are his scenes of markets, depicting respectively a Horse market (Alte Pinakothek in Munich), a Fish market and a Poultry market (both in the Palace on the Water).

Verdussen etched a series of 12 plates, which are known under the title Horses and landscapes. They represent various scenes with horses in nature engaging in activities such as hunting, battle, cart pulling and agricultural work. One work does not depict horses but three cows near a river.
