= Peter IV Vanden Gheyn =

Peter Vanden Gheyn (Dutch: Peeter Vanden Gheÿn or Dutch: Ghein; 1605 or 1607–1654 or 1659) was a bellfounder of the Spanish Netherlands (now Belgium).

== Life ==
Peter was born into a famous family of bellfounders and himself became the most famous bellfounder of the 17th century. His father was Jan III Vanden Gheyn. The family forge was at Mechelen in what is now Belgium. His associate was named Peter Deklerk or de Clerck, his uncle by marriage.

His total production of bells was not great. He cast the Salvator bell for St Rumbold's in Mechelen in 1638, which weighed 15,000 pounds (6,800 kg) and cracked in 1696. He also cast the Salvator bell for St Gudula's in Brussels.

He had the curious affectation of inscribing his bells using type of various sizes within the same word.
