= Pieter van Aelst (17th century) =

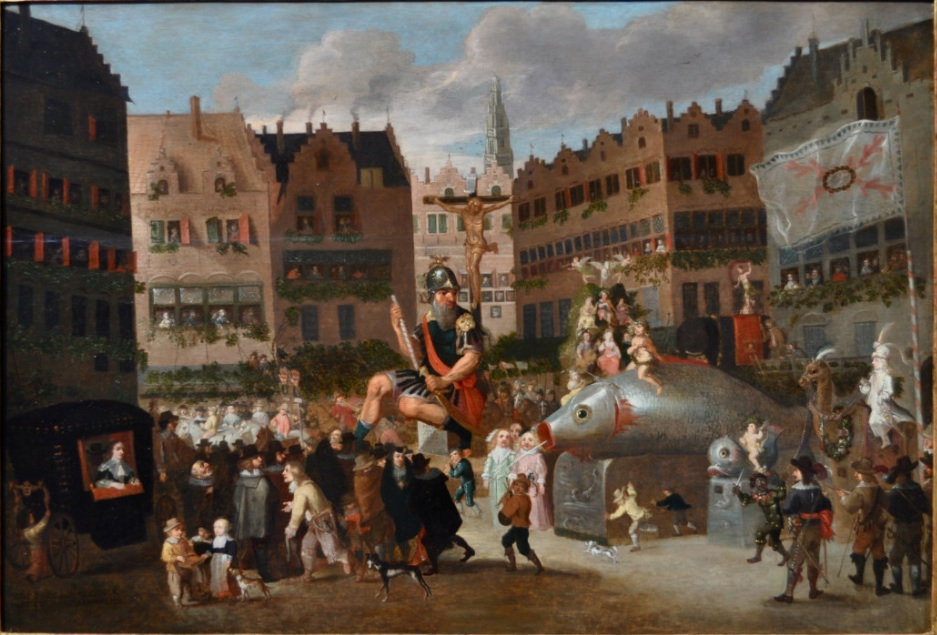
The Ommegang in Antwerp

Peter van Aelst, Peeter van Aelst or Pieter van Aelst was a Flemish genre painter and draughtsman active in Antwerp from 1644 to 1654.

== Life and work ==
There are no records about the life and training of this artist active in Antwerp in the mid-17th century.

He is currently known for only one work attributed to him. It represents the Ommegang in Antwerp. As it was probably painted between 1644 and 1654, this composition was possibly the inspiration for the various interpretations of the subject, which Flemish artists such as Erasmus de Bie and Alexander van Bredael painted at a later date.
