= Garland of Flowers with Bird and a Butterfly =

17th-century painting by Juan de Arellano

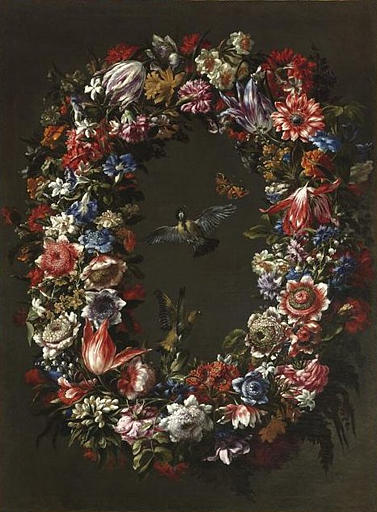

Garland of Flowers with Bird and a Butterfly is a c. 1650–1670 still life oil-on-canvas painting, now in the Musée du Louvre in Paris. The eponymous animals in the centre are a great tit (top), a nine-primaried oscine (bottom) and a peacock butterfly. It was most recently exhibited in the "Sélectionner, collectionner, classer" section of the Louvre's own exhibition Les Choses. Une histoire de la nature morte from 12 October 2022 to 23 January 2023.

== History ==
17th-century Europe was fascinated by botany, leading to a boom in floral still life paintings by Flemish artists such as Jan Brueghel the Elder and Daniel Seghers in the 17th century, with the Spanish proving particularly keen collectors of them. In the second half of the century some Spanish painters specialised in them almost exclusively, showing luxuriant bouquets, garlands and columns of flowers. One of these was Juan de Arellano, who headed a very prosperous studio in Madrid.

Unsigned, the painting is attributed to de Arellano due to the wide variety of flowers scientifically portrayed, the precise underdrawing and the quite free arrangement of them with the petals (especially those of the red and white tulip at bottom left) seemingly troubled by a breeze, though the inclusion of a dahlia and orange blossom is rare for the artist. It was restored in 2004, cleaning the varnish and supporting this attribution by revealing a very neat technique and a preference for primary colours such as red and blue combined with brilliant white.
