= Recoletos =

Recoletos may refer to:

- The Order of Augustinian Recollects
- Paseo de Recoletos
- Recoletos (Madrid)
- Convento de los Agustinos Recoletos (Madrid)
