= Andries Bosman =

Flemish priest and painter (1621–1681)

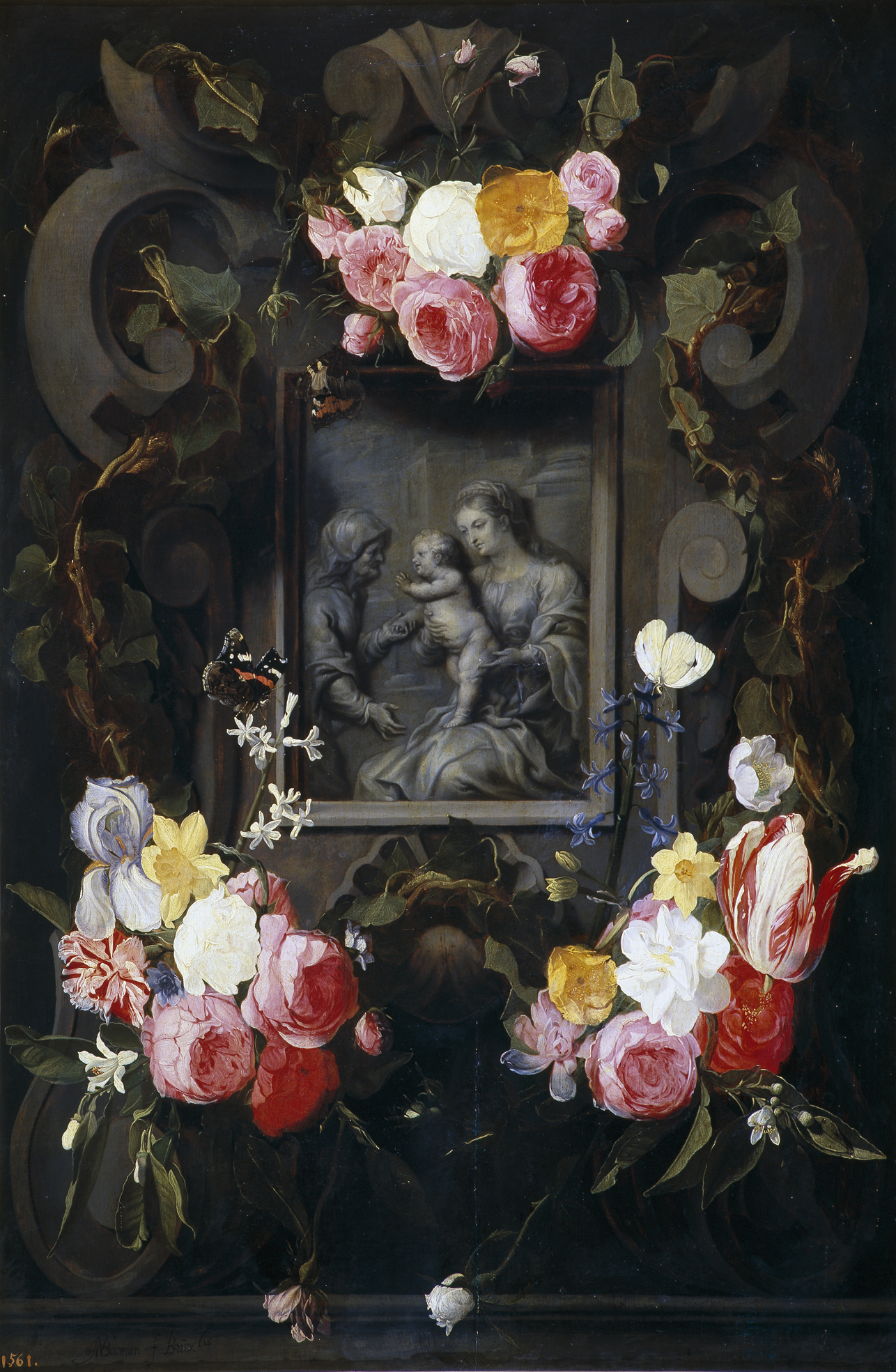
Garland around St Anna, the Virgin and the Child

Andries Bosman or Andries Bosmans (Antwerp, 1621 – Rome, c. 1681) was a Flemish priest and painter, who specialized in flower paintings and was mainly active in Antwerp and Rome. He was particularly known for collaborative paintings in which he painted flower garlands around religious scenes or portraits painted by a specialist figure painter.

== Life ==
Only very little is known about the life and artistic training of Andries Bosman. He was baptized in Antwerp's St George Church on 28 July 1621. He was registered as an apprentice at the Guild of St. Luke in Antwerp in 1637. It was not recorded who his teacher was. It is assumed that he studied with the Jesuit priest and prominent flower painter Daniel Seghers.

Bosman studied theology. After completing this study with success, painting always remained secondary to this career as a priest. He became chaplain to the art-loving Bishop Anthonius Triest in Ghent in 1641. In 1657 Bosman returned to Antwerp where he had been appointed canon in the St. James' Church in Antwerp. In 1664 he renounced his prebend and left for Italy. It is reported that during his residence in Italy he participated in painting commissions. He stayed mainly in Rome, where in 1676 he collaborated with Niccolò Stanchi in the decoration of the Palazzo Borghese gallery by adding flowers to mirrors. He also collaborated with the Italian painter Ciro Ferri.

Bosman is believed to have died between 1671 and 1692.

== Work ==
Only a few works by Bosman are recorded. He was a close follower of his presumed master Daniel Seghers. A study comparing the painting techniques used by both artists in two paintings disclosed the similarity in their techniques and the materials they used.

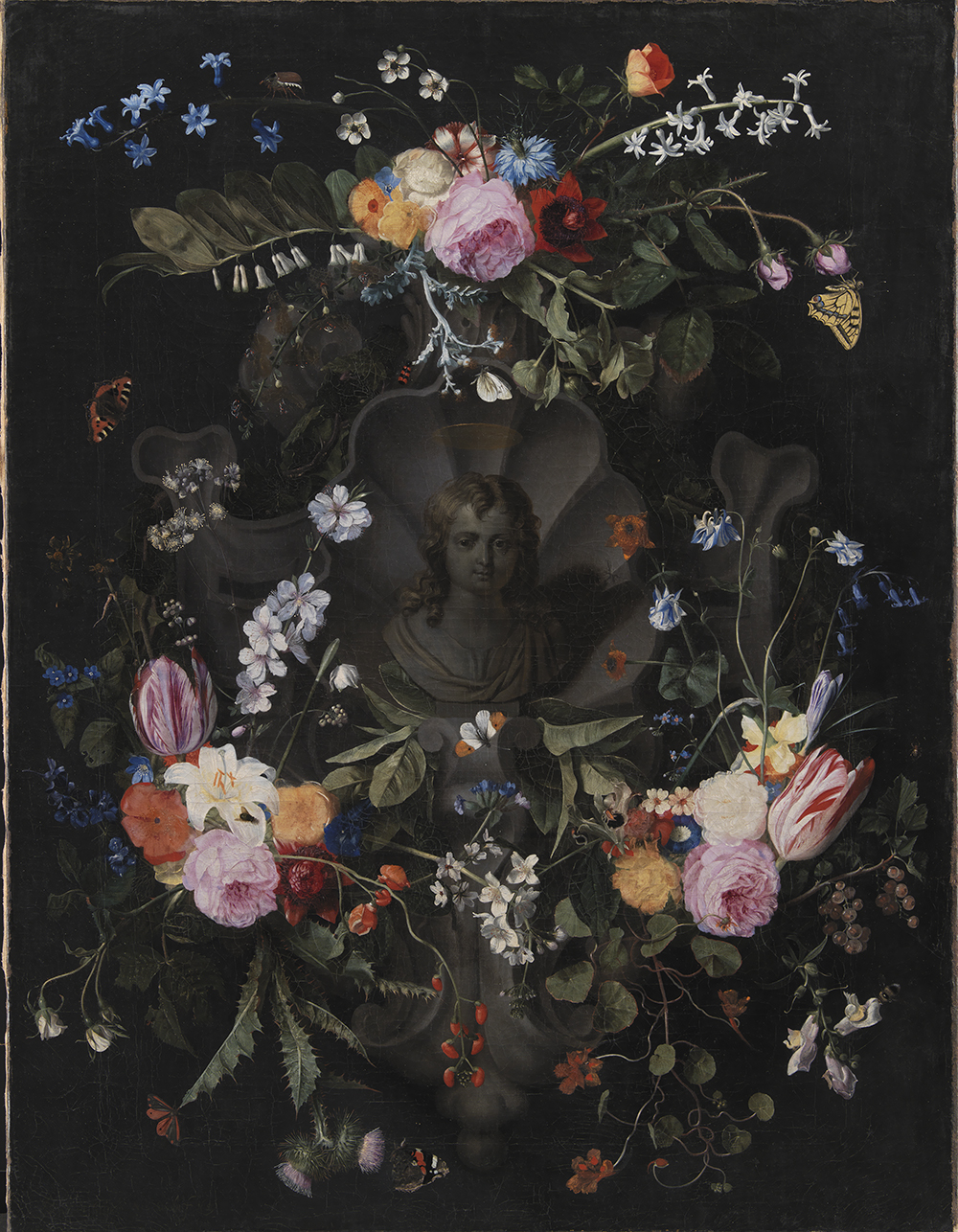
Cartouche with the Christ Child surrounded by a flower garland

Some of Bosman's works have been confounded with those of Seghers because of the signature "DS" on some works of Bosman. This was, however, not intended as a reference to Daniel Seghers, but to his membership in the Society of Jesus.

A majority of Bosman's work falls into a distinctively Flemish genre, which is referred to as 'garland painting'. Garland paintings are a special type of still life developed in early 17th century Antwerp by Daniel Seghers' master Jan Brueghel the Elder at the instigation of the Italian cardinal Federico Borromeo. Other artists involved in the early development of the genre included Hendrick van Balen, Andries Daniels, Peter Paul Rubens and Daniel Seghers himself. The genre was initially connected to the visual imagery of the Counter-Reformation movement. It was further inspired by the cult of veneration and devotion to Mary prevalent at the Habsburg court (then the rulers over the Southern Netherlands) and in Antwerp generally. Garland paintings typically show a flower garland around a devotional image, portrait or other religious symbol (such as the host). Garland paintings were typically collaborations between a still life specialist and a figure painter.

Bosman collaborated on garland paintings for which he painted the flower garlands. It is not known who were the figure painters who added the figures in the central cartouche of these paintings. A garland painted referred to as Garland around St Anna, the Virgin and the Child signed as having been painted in Brussels is a copy of a work by Seghers of the same subject in the Kunsthistorisches Museum.

The National Gallery of Denmark in Copenhagen holds a garland painting entitled Cartouche with the Christ Child surrounded by a flower garland, which is signed "A.Bosman Canon St. Jacobi f. 1659 ".

Even while Bosman followed Seghers' style closely, there are stylistic differences between the two painters' work. Bosman's colors are clearer than Seghers'. Bosman pays less attention to a meticulous representation of the details of his subjects, while he treats the effects and contrasts of light on objects and space less gently.
