= Jan Philip van Thielen =

Flemish painter (1618–1667)

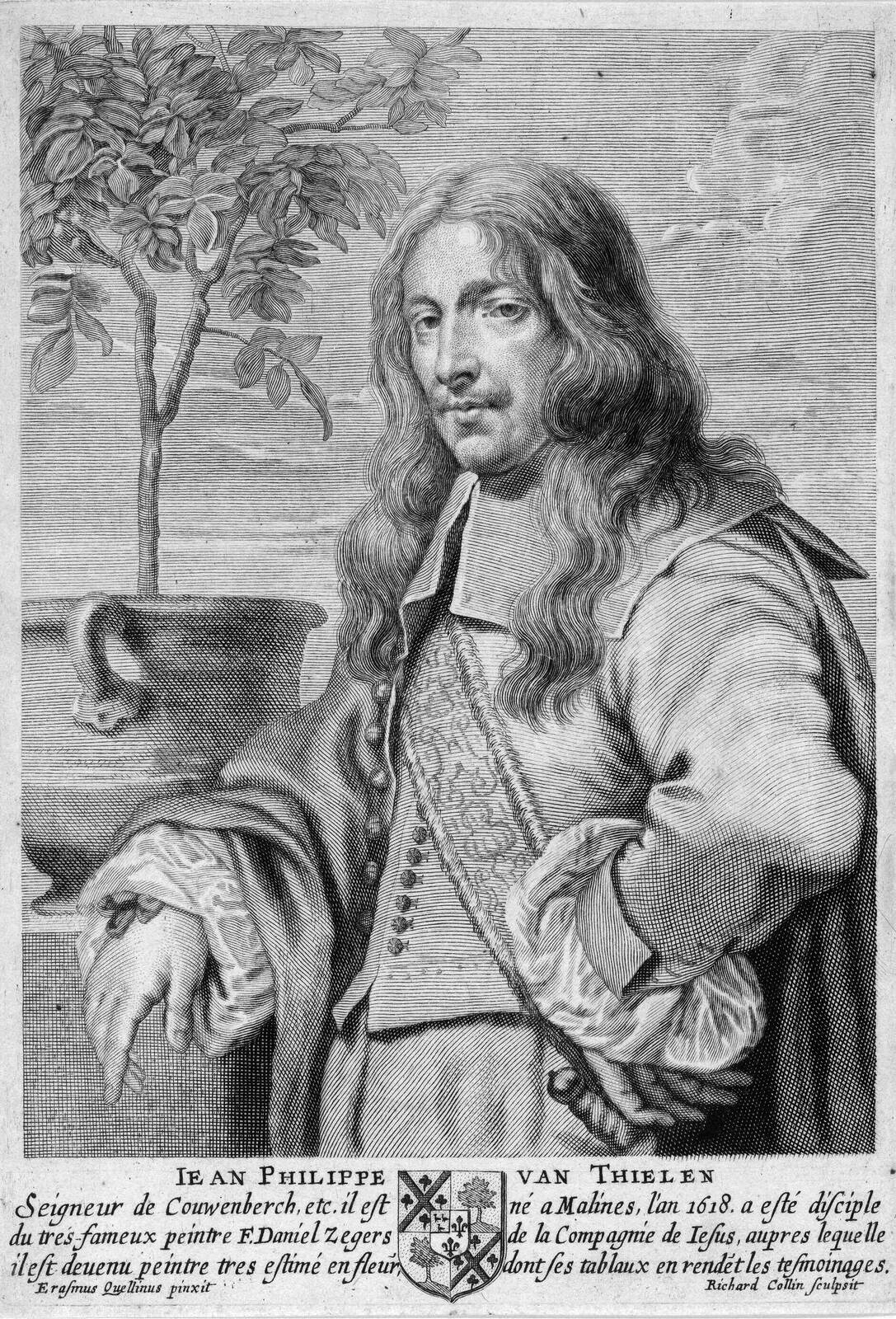
Portrait of Jan Philip van Thielen

Jan Philip van Thielen or Jan Philips van Thielen (1618 in Mechelen – 1667 in Booischot) was a Flemish painter who specialized in flower pieces and garland paintings. He was a regular collaborator with leading Flemish and Dutch figure painters of his time. Van Thielen was the most popular flower painter in Flanders and his patrons included Diego Felipez de Guzmán, 1st Marquis of Leganés and Leopold Wilhelm of Austria, the art-loving governor of the Spanish Netherlands.

== Life ==
Van Thielen was born in Mechelen as the son of a minor nobleman by the name of Liebrecht van Thielen. Jan Philip would eventually assume his father's title of Lord of Couwenberch. His mother was Anna Rigouts or Rigouldts. He signed some of his paintings with the names of Couwenberg and Rigouldts in his signature, to point to his noble status.

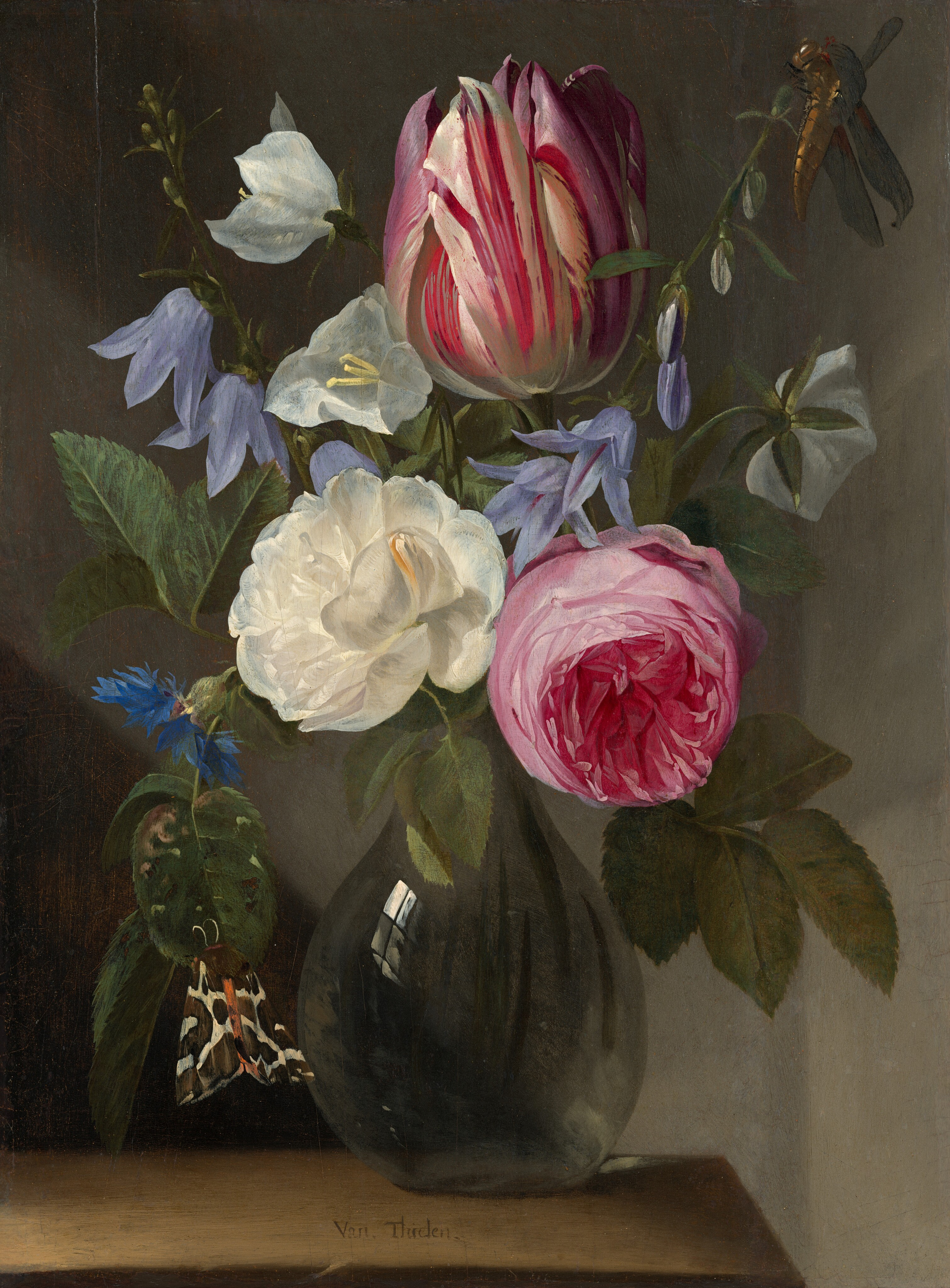
Roses and a tulip in a glass vase

He left his native Mechelen for Antwerp where in 1631 or 1632 he started his training as a painter with his brother-in-law Theodoor Rombouts who had married his sister Anna in 1627. Rombouts was a leading history and genre painter who had studied in Italy where he had become a follower of Caravaggio. Theodoor Rombouts was a prominent history painter who had married Jan Philip's sister Anna in 1627. In 1639 van Thielen married Francisca de Hemelaer with whom he had 9 children. Through his marriage he was the brother-in-law of Erasmus Quellinus II. Erasmus Quelllinus was married to the sister of his wife and would become one of the leading history painters in Flanders after the deaths of Rubens and van Dyck. Quellinus drew van Thielens' portrait that was engraved by Richard Collin for Cornelis de Bie's book of artist biographies Het Gulden Cabinet.

Because he liked flower painting he changed masters in 1641 and began training with Daniel Seghers, the leading flower painter in Flanders. He became a master in the Antwerp Guild of Saint Luke in 1641. In 1660 he moved with his family to his hometown Mechelen where he became a master in the local Guild of Saint Luke the next year.

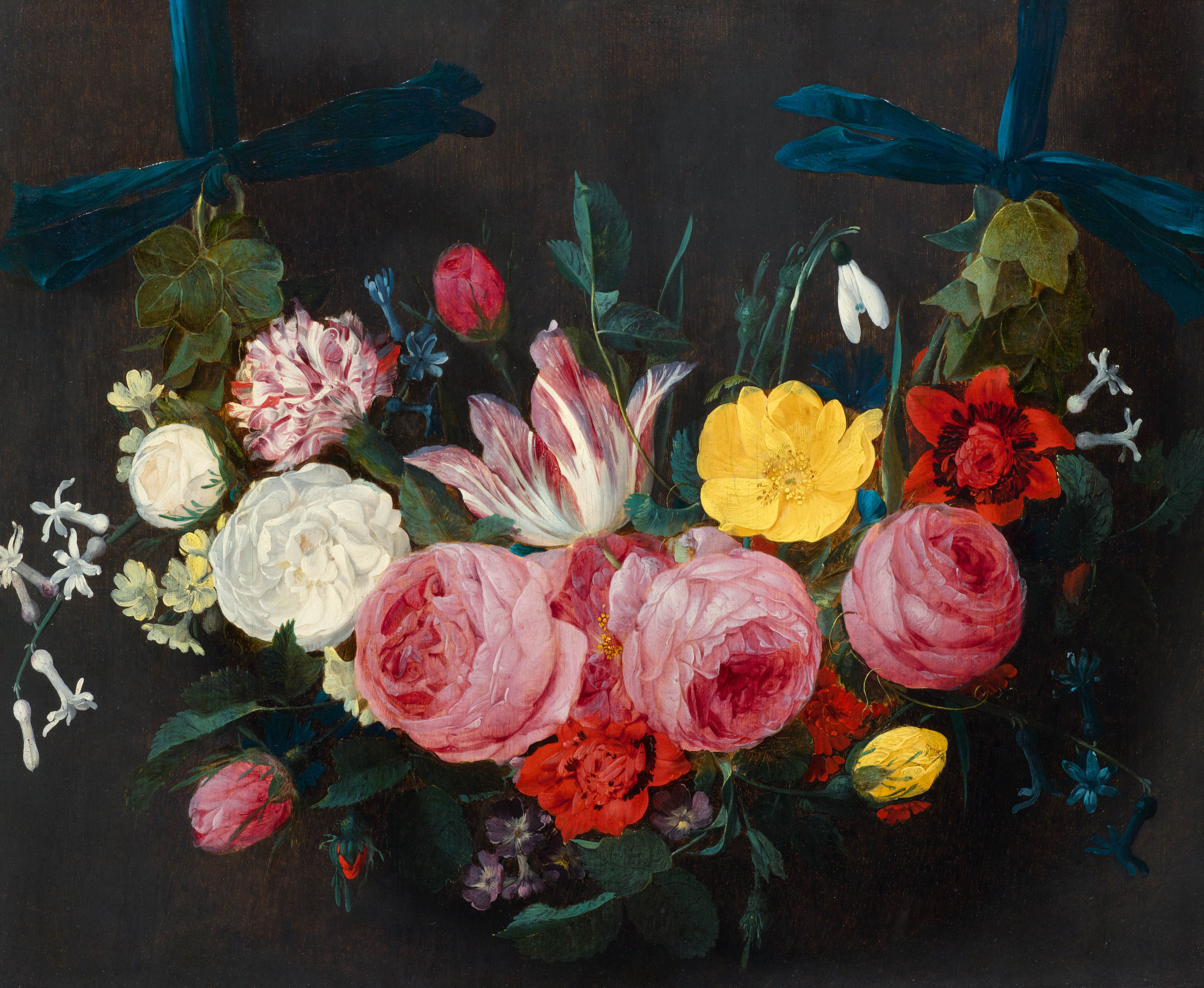
Garland of flowers and ivy on a blue ribbon

Three of van Thielen's daughters became flower painters: Maria Theresa van Thielen (1640–1706), Anna-Maria (b 1641) and Francisca-Catherina (b 1645). Only works of the eldest sister have come down to us as the two younger sisters entered convents. The sisters must have been exceptional flower painters as they were praised by their contemporary, the artist biographer Cornelis de Bie in his Het Gulden Cabinet published in 1662. Van Thielen was the teacher of his daughters and also taught a certain N. Bainville in Mechelen.

He died in 1667 in Booischot.

== Work ==
=== General ===
Van Thielen painted flower pieces as well as garland paintings with dates ranging from 1646 to 1667. As his paintings are generally signed it has been possible to establish the chronology and development of his oeuvre. He signed with I. P. Van Thielen Rigouldts (after his mother) in the 1640s, I. P. Van Thielen after 1650, and I. P. Van Thielen Heere Van CouwenBerche on later works in the 1660s, after he had assumed the title of Lord of Couwenberch.

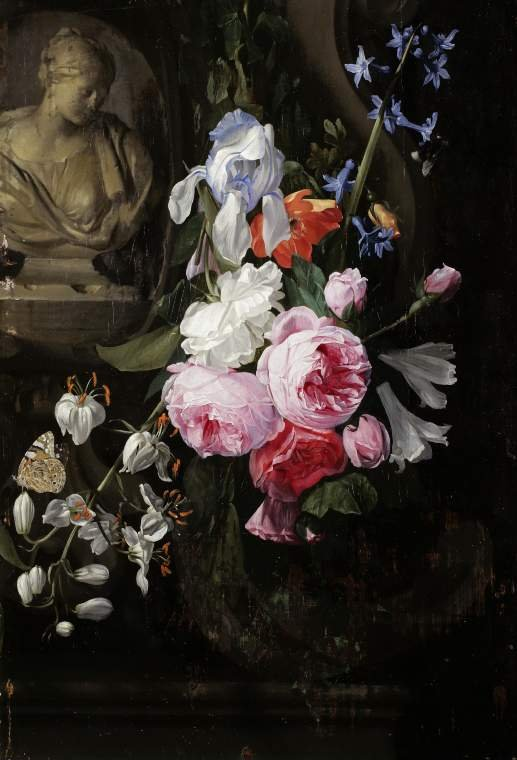
Vase of flowers

=== Flower pieces ===
The style of his flower pieces is less spontaneous than that of his master Seghers. Each flower stands out individually rather than blending into the composition as a whole. In his flower paintings he demonstrated his skills as a colourist, which contributed to his commercial success. An example is the Roses and a tulip in a glass vase in the National Gallery of Art in Washington.

=== Garland paintings ===
Van Thielen regularly worked on garland paintings in which the staffage was painted by other artists. Garland paintings are a special type of still life developed in Antwerp by Jan Brueghel the Elder and Hendrick van Balen at the request of the Italian cardinal Federico Borromeo at the beginning of the 17th century. Other artists involved in the early development of the genre included his master Daniel Seghers, Andries Daniels and Peter Paul Rubens. The genre was initially connected to the visual imagery of the Counter-Reformation movement. It was further inspired by the cult of veneration and devotion to Mary prevalent at the Habsburg court (then the rulers over the Southern Netherlands) and in Antwerp generally. Garland paintings typically show a flower garland around a devotional image, portrait or other religious symbol (such as the host). The paintings are usually a collaboration between a flower painter and a staffage painter.

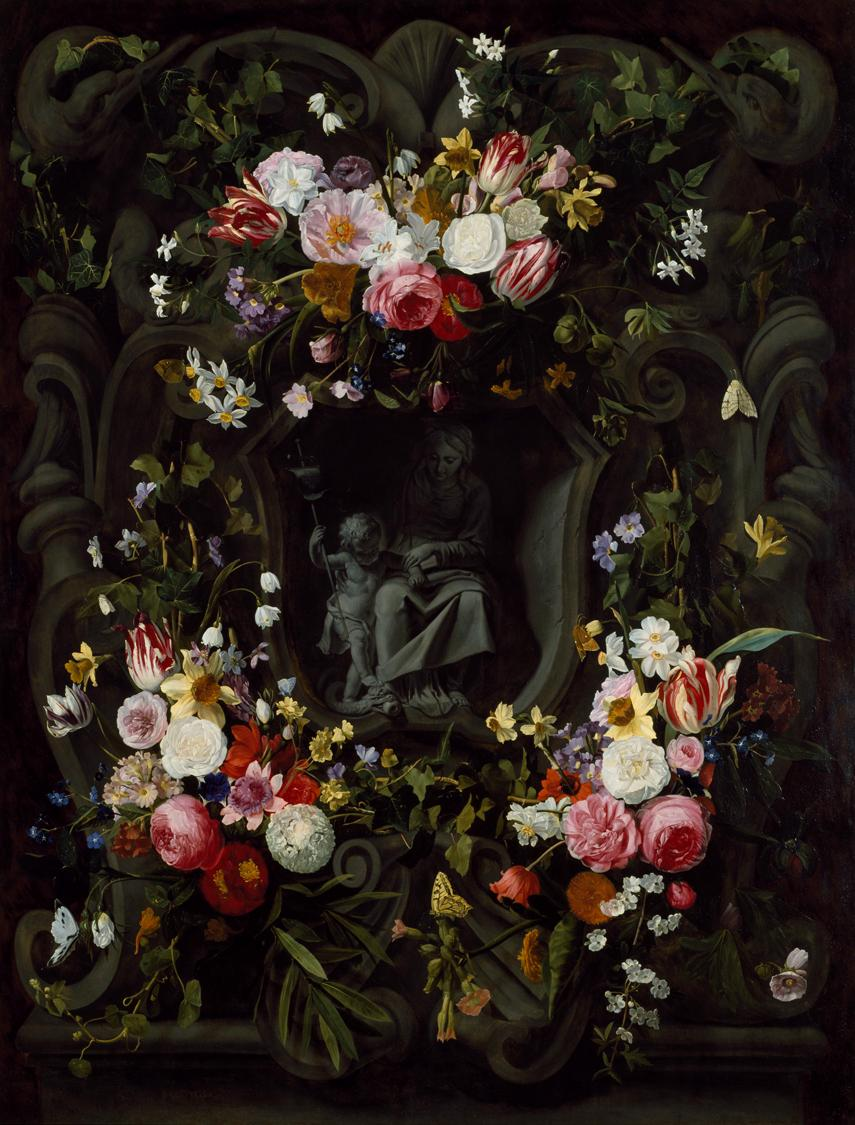
Stone Cartouche with Virgin and Child in a Garland of Flowers

Van Thielen produced multiple garland paintings in collaboration with other artists. His collaborators included his brother-in-law Erasmus Quellinus II, Nicolas de Largilliere, Jan van Balen, Frans Francken the Younger, Cornelis Schut and Cornelis van Poelenburch. The cartouches in the garlands typically depict religious or mythological themes. Unlike his master Seghers whose flower garlands are dynamic, van Thielen arranged the flowers and leaves of his flower garlands in a regular manner.

An example of a collaboration of van Thielen and Quellinus on a garland painting is a Stone Cartouche with the Virgin and Child in a Garland of Flowers (Chrysler Museum of Art) (1651), which is signed by both artists. Van Thielen painted the flower garland while his brother-in-law Erasmus Quellinus painted the cartouche. The cartouche painted by Quellinus in grisaille represents sculptures of the Virgin and Christ Child subduing the serpent. The serpent clutches the apple of Original Sin. The intricate stone cartouche is crowned at the upper corners with a pair of swans. Van Thielen painted ivy (a symbol of death, remembrance and eternal life) into the cartouches and added a variety of flowers: roses, jasmine, daffodils, snow drops, hydrangea, nasturtium, apple blossoms, anemones. Each flower alludes to the virtues of the Virgin and Child. Van Thielen also added moths and butterflies, which are symbols of the resurrection of Christ and his triumph over death. As the flowers include both spring and summer blooms, they are not based on a real-life bouquet. They symbolize the eternal virtues of the Virgin and Child.

== Collections ==
The Ashmolean Museum (University of Oxford), the Fitzwilliam Museum (University of Cambridge), the Honolulu Museum of Art, the National Gallery of Art (Washington D.C.) and the Pinacoteca di Brera (Milan) are among the public collections holding paintings by Jan Philip van Thielen.
