= Francisco de Solís =

Spanish baroque painter

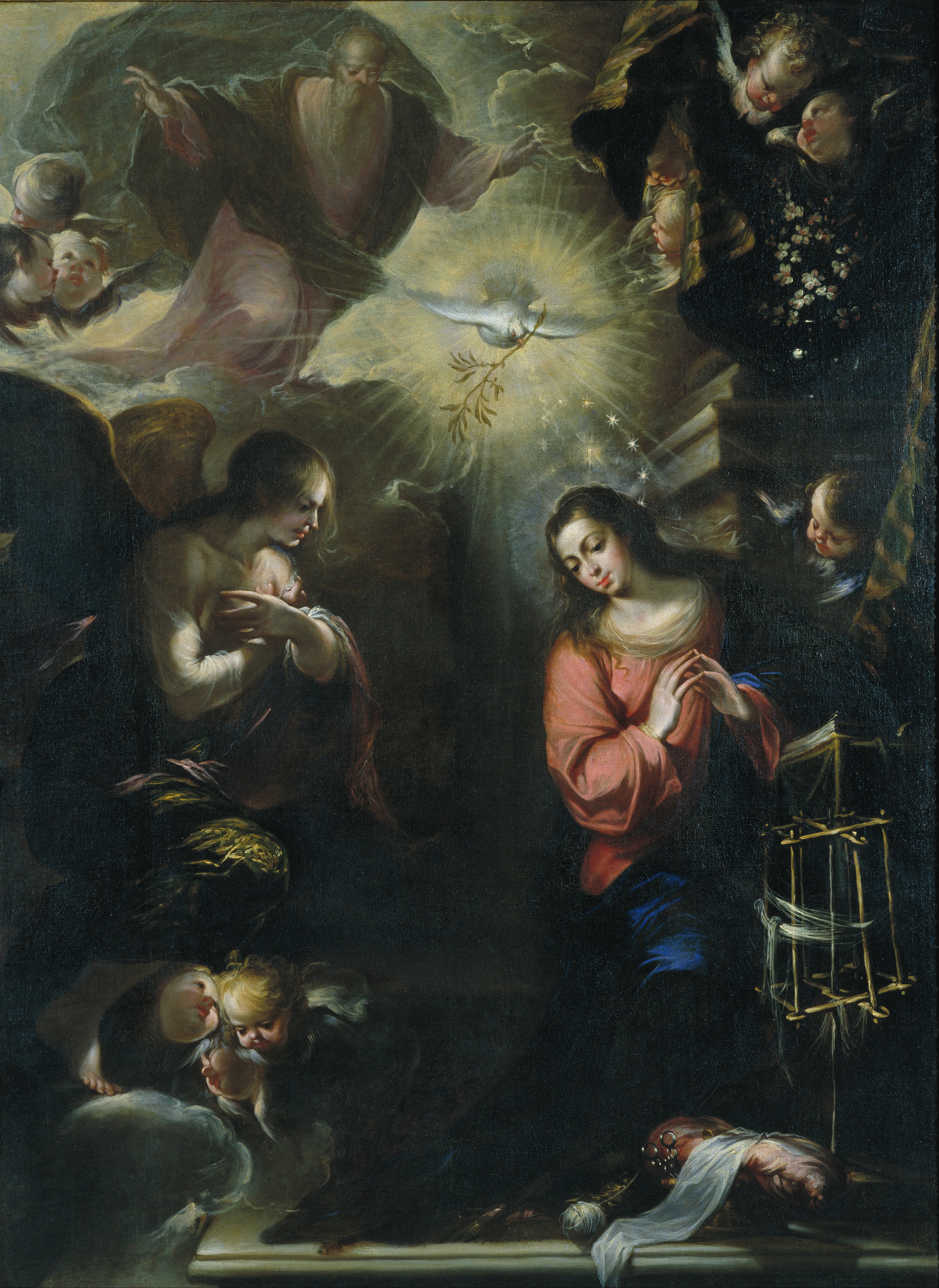
The Annunciation

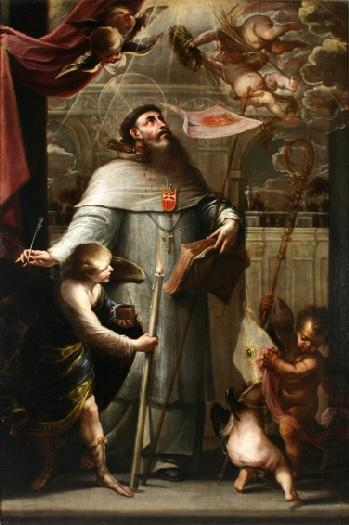
Saint Peter Pascual

Francisco de Solís (c.1620/1625, Madrid - 25 September 1684, Madrid), was a Spanish painter in the Baroque style. He also collected drawings and compiled biographies of other Spanish painters.

== Life and work ==
He was the son of the well known painter and scenographer, Juan de Solís, who wanted him to pursue an ecclesiastical career. He did, however, continue to practice painting in his father's workshop when he could spare the time. At the age of eighteen, he painted a scene depicting the Capuchins of Villarrubia de los Ojos, which was shown publicly before being taken to them. This attracted the attention of King Philip IV, who wanted to know more about the artist. This convinced him to make art his primary profession.

He was married to Lucía Barragán, also from a family of the minor nobility, and associated with intellectuals such as Pedro Calderón de la Barca. He was without financial worries, which made him unambitious as an artist, but he amassed a large library and a valuable collection of prints and drawings; some of which were signed as gifts to him. This included a drawing book of works by Diego de Obregón, the son of Pedro de Obregón. For many years, he operated a drawing school, but his only student who became known was the painter, José Moreno.

He painted at many of the convents in Madrid, which provided for connections that brought commissions from outside the area; including the Franciscans in Viana and the Dominicans in Villanueva de los Infantes. In 1675, he painted the Annunciation for the convent of the Discalced Carmelites in Boadilla del Monte, where his daughter, Petronila, took her vows. He also did paintings for the chapel of the Convento de Copacabana.

All of his preserved works are of a religious nature, but he apparently painted scenes from mythology as well; notably a series on the Labors of Hercules at the Plaza de San Salvador, which were commissioned to celebrate the arrival of Marie Louise d’Orléans and her court in 1679.

He died in Madrid and was interred at the Convento de la Victoria.
