= Theodoor Rombouts =

Flemish painter (1597–1637)

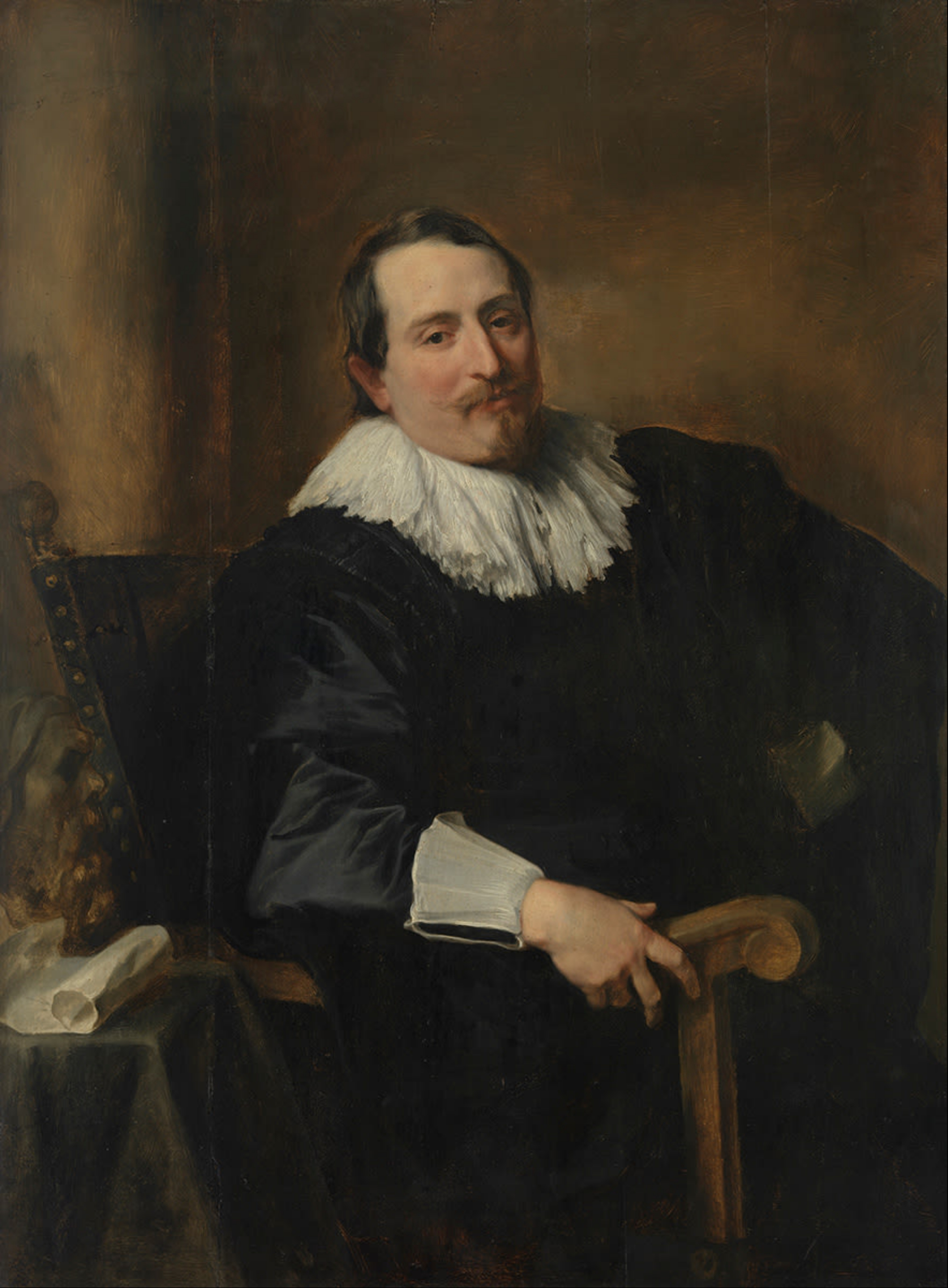
Portrait of Theodoor Rombouts by Anthony van Dyck

Theodoor Rombouts (2 July 1597 – 14 September 1637) was a Flemish painter who is mainly known for his Caravaggesque genre scenes depicting lively dramatic gatherings as well as religiously themed works. He is considered to be the primary and most original representative of Flemish Caravaggism. These Caravaggisti were part of an international movement of European artists who interpreted the work of Caravaggio and the followers of Caravaggio in a personal manner.

== Life ==
Rombouts was born on 2 July 1597 in Antwerp, the son of Bartholomeus Rombouts, a wealthy tailor, and Barbara de Greve. He was a pupil of Frans (Franchois) van Lanckvelt in 1608 and later also studied under Abraham Janssens and possibly Nicolas Régnier in Antwerp. He traveled to Rome in 1616 and stayed there until 1625. He was recorded in the Roman parish of Sant’Andrea delle Fratte, along with two other Flemish painters, Francesco Tornelli (Tournier?) and Robert d’Orteil. It is possible that on a visit to Florence he met the Caravaggist Bartolomeo Manfredi and worked for Cosimo II de' Medici. In 1622, he also travelled to Pisa.

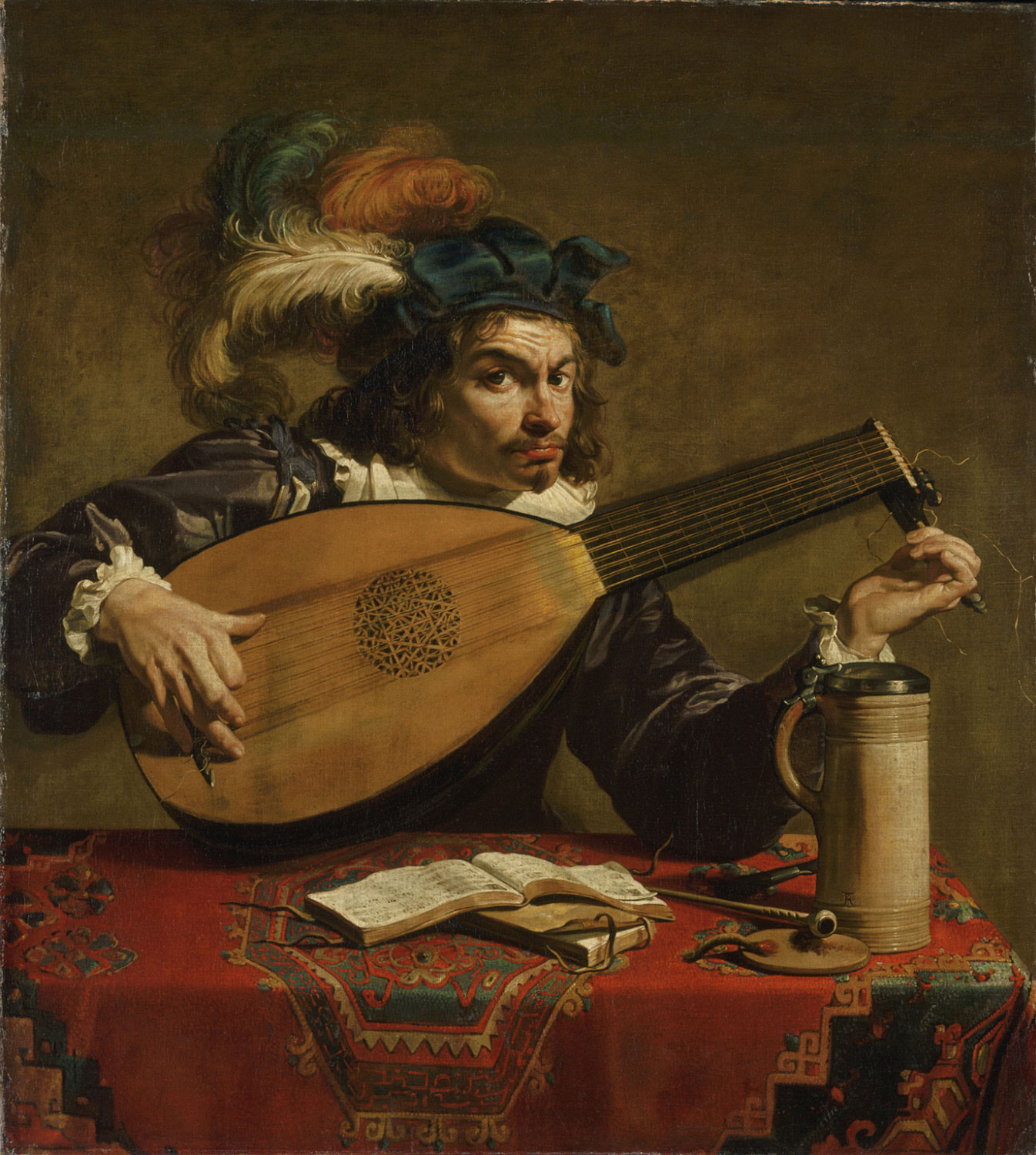
The lute player

Upon his return to Antwerp in 1625, Rombouts became a master of the Guild of St. Luke. In 1627, he married Anna van Thielen, who was from a noble family. As his wife's family was not from Antwerp but from the Mechelen area, Rombouts had been required to obtain, before the wedding, a dispensation from the Antwerp City Council to consummate the marriage outside Antwerp in order not to lose his Antwerp citizenship rights (in Dutch: 'poortersrechten'). The year after the wedding the couple had a daughter. His wife's brother Jan Philip van Thielen became his pupil in 1631 but would become a still life painter rather than a genre or history painter like Rombouts.

From 1628 to 1630, Rombouts was deacon of the Guild in Antwerp. In 1635, Rombouts collaborated with other artists on the programme of the decorations of the Joyous Entry of Cardinal-infante Ferdinand in Antwerp, which was under the general direction of Rubens. He died on 14 September 1637, aged 40, in Antwerp, not long after the completion of this decorative project.

Rombouts's pupils were Nicolaas van Eyck, Jan Philip van Thielen and Paulus Robyns.

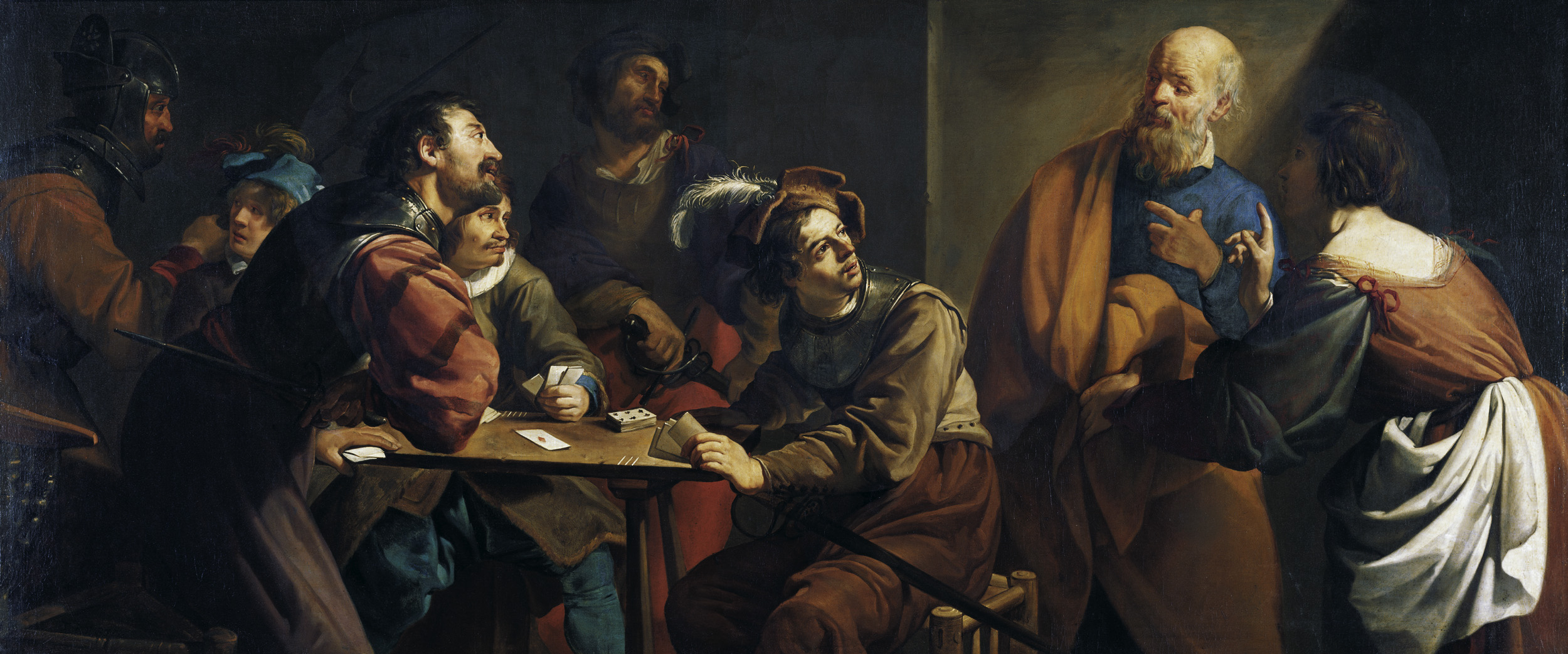
The denial of Saint Peter

== Works ==
=== General ===
Rombouts painted mainly profane works as well as some altar pieces and civil commissions. His profane works depict merry companies, musicians, card players, as well as some of the other Caraveggesque themes such as the denial of St Peter and the five senses. He worked on commission and for the free market. Many of his commissions came from patrons based in the city of Ghent.

Rombouts's genre pieces were painted on horizontal canvases. He also painted a few religious and mythological works on horizontal canvases, as is the case with Christ Driving the Money-changers from the Temple (Royal Museum of Fine Arts Antwerp).

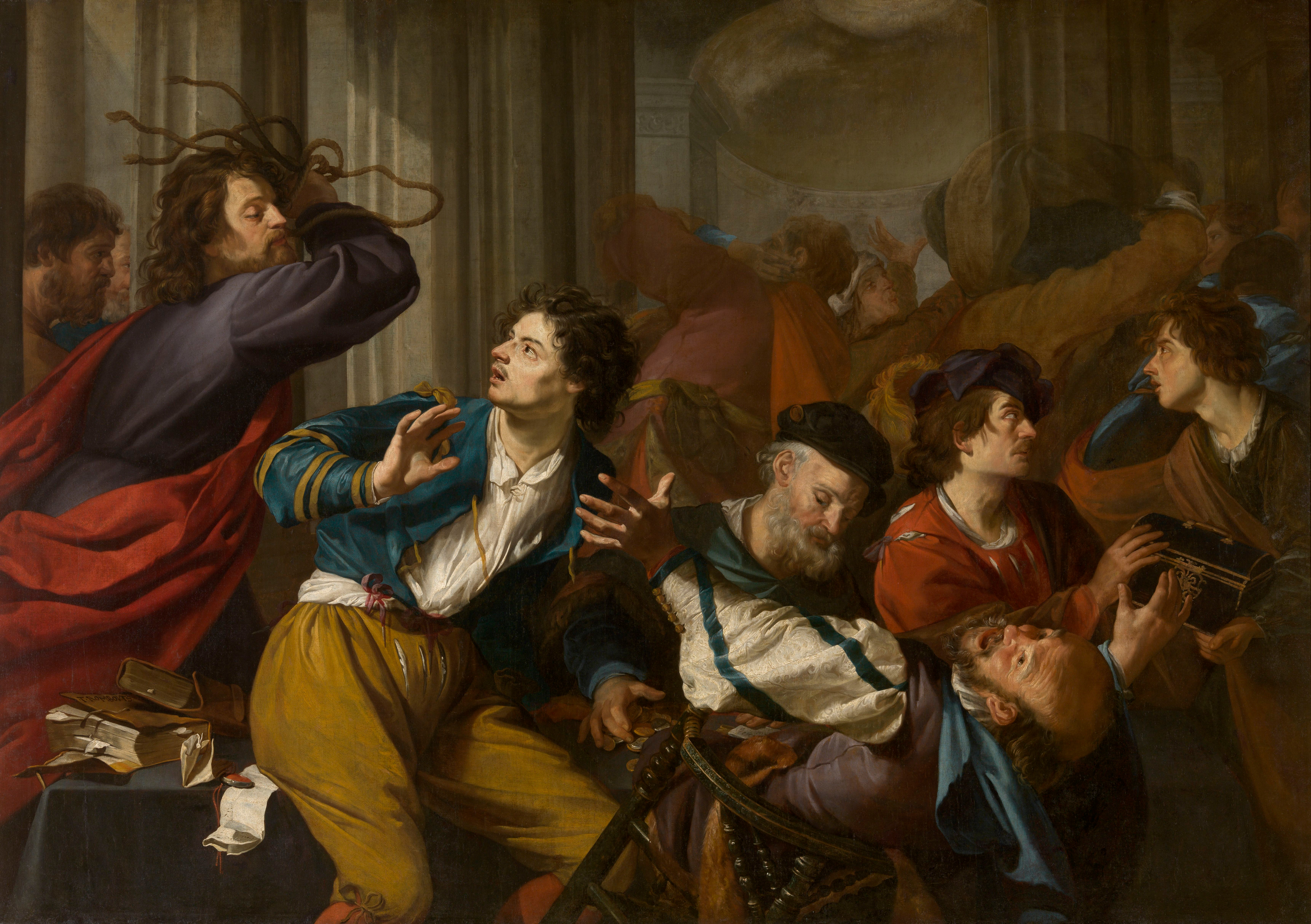
Christ driving the money-changers from the Temple

=== Early work ===
Rombouts's initial works were in the idiom of his master Abraham Janssens who was one of the earliest Flemish artists to paint in a Caraveggio influenced style combined with strong Classicist tendencies. This is clear in the early composition Cephalus and Procris (Hermitage Museum, 1610s) which was painted before the artist left for Italy. In its three-dimensionality and use of Classical forms this composition is clearly indebted to Janssens.

The composition The two musicians (Spencer Museum of Art) likely dates from the artist's Italian period. The typically Italian costumes, the rather mannered poses, the vague indication of space and stereotypical rendering of heads, hands and drapery point to a style preceding that of the genre scenes he painted after 1625.

=== Genre painter ===
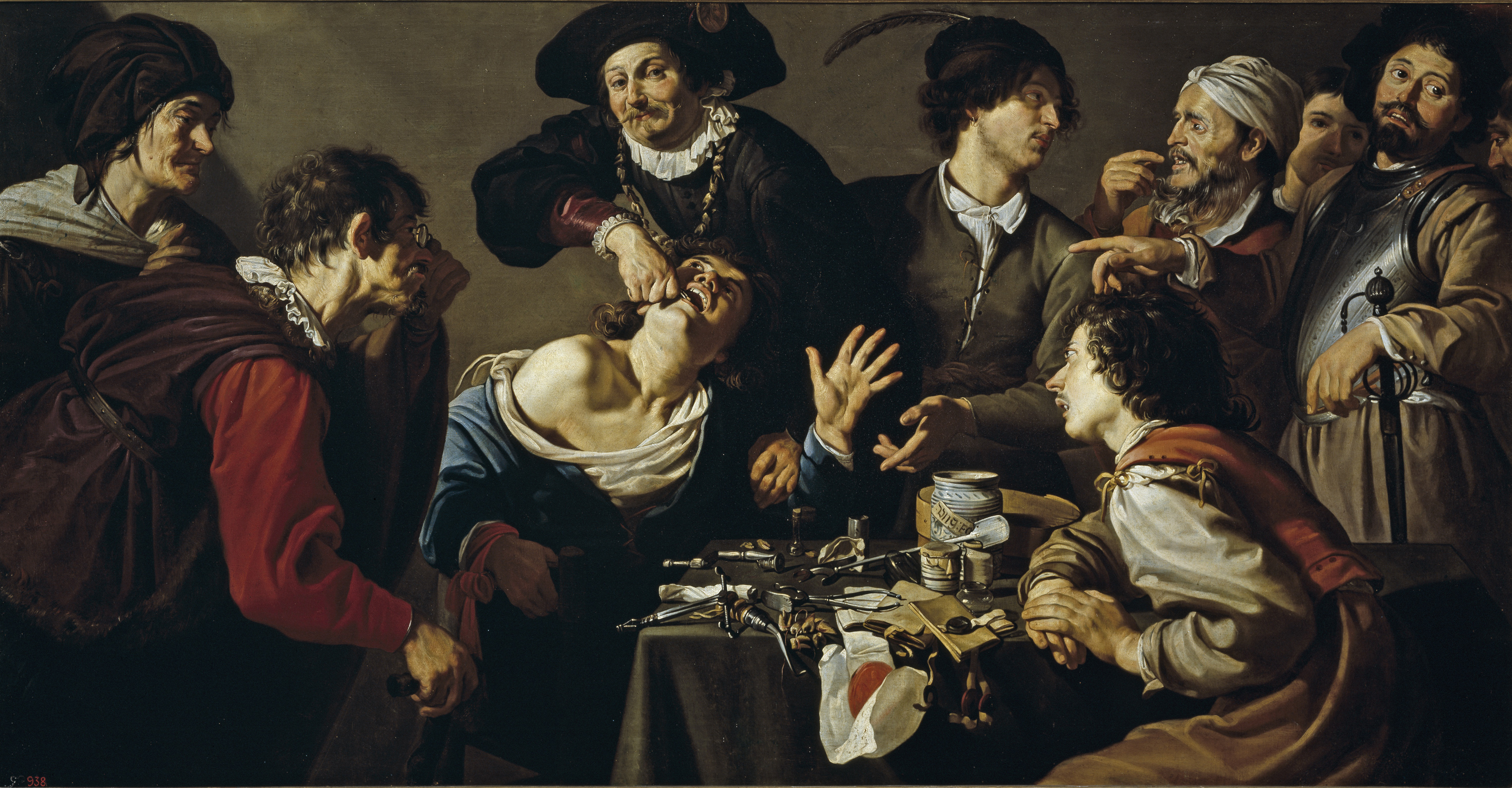
The quack tooth puller, The Prado Museum

Rombouts was very successful after his return from Italy during the heyday of the Caravaggio movement in the Southern Netherlands from 1620 to 1640. His Caravaggesque conversation pieces are realistic and expressive. His work during this period is characterised by the use of chiaroscuro, the horizontal format and a pronounced modelé that sometimes looks sculptural and that points to the influence of his master Abraham Janssens. His use of diagonals in the composition and perspectival abbreviation, the illusive use of foreshortening and the avoidance of a conventional backdrop are prominent in a work such as the Card players (Royal Museum of Fine Arts Antwerp). As in the work of his master Janssens, Rombouts's figures have an almost sculptural aspect.

Rombouts was the first Flemish painter who, like Gerrit van Honthorst in the Dutch Republic, painted single male or female musicians. It is likely that he developed this type of painting under the direct influence of the works of the followers of Caravaggio whose works he had seen in Italy rather than through the intermediary of the Dutch Caravaggists. Rombouts's Lute player (Royal Museum of Fine Arts Antwerp, 1620s) is a good example of the influence of Manfredi and Valentin de Boulogne on the Flemish Caravaggisti. Other Flemish painters such as Jacob Jordaens, Gonzales Coques, Jan Cossiers and Gillis Remeeus would later also adopt the type of the single musician.

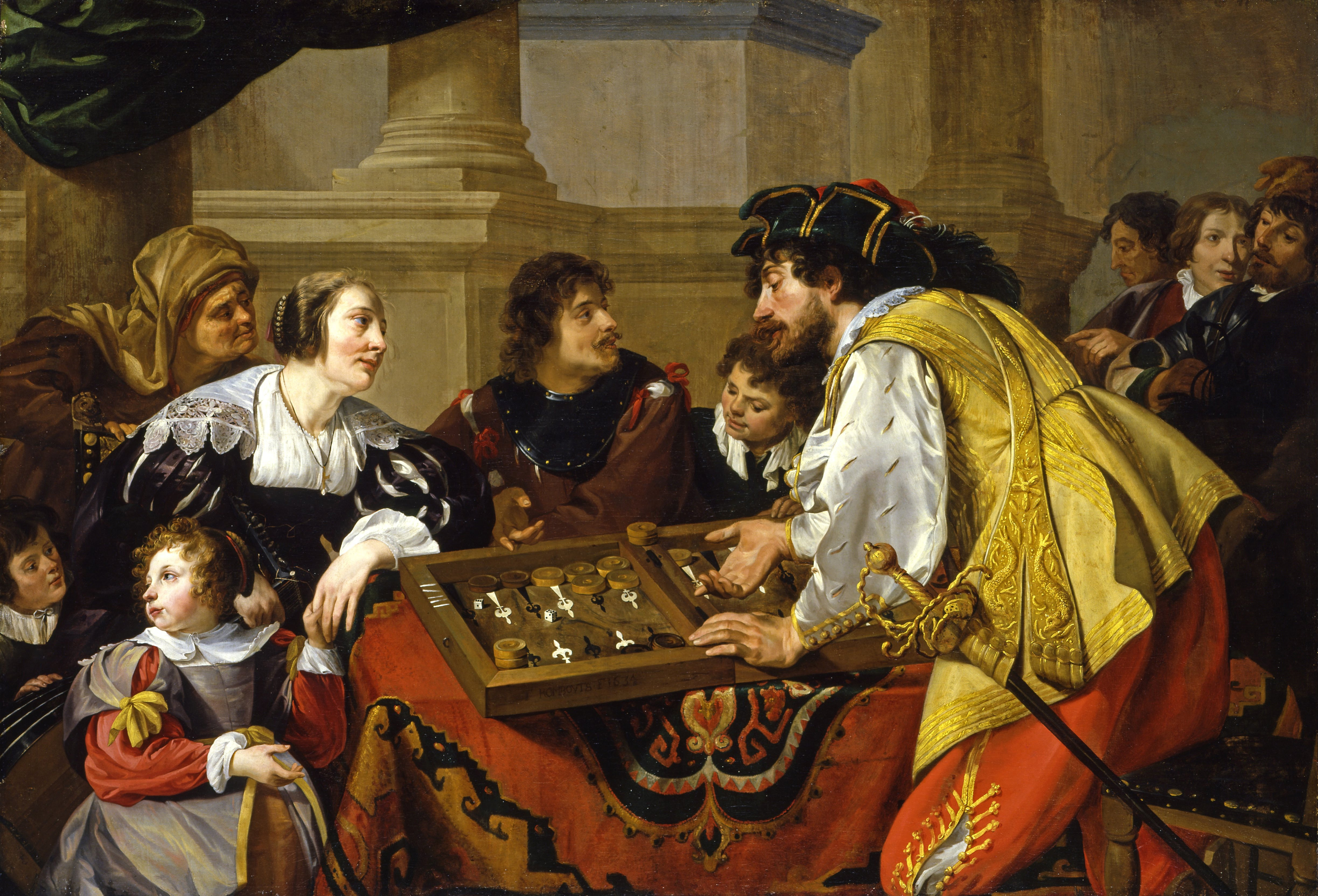
Backgammon Players

The themes of the five senses and the seven deadly sins often appear in his work. Rombouts's The Lute Player (c. 1620, Philadelphia Museum of Art) is not solely a portrait of a musician but also alludes to the five senses through the objects included in the composition: hearing (the lute), taste (the tankard), smell (the pipe), sight (the musical scores), and touch (the knife). The Card and backgammon players. Fight over cards (c. 1620–1630, National Gallery of Denmark) has uncontrolled anger as its principal subject. Moralising depictions of the deadly sin of wrath (anger) had been a tradition in Northern art for centuries.

Rombouts regularly included portraits of himself and his wife in his genre paintings. An example is the Musical company with Bacchus (The Kremer Collection). Based on the two pendant portraits by Anthony van Dyck of Rombouts and Rombouts's wife with their daughter in the Alte Pinakothek Munich, the couple in the middle of this composition is believed to represent Rombouts and his wife. That the two should be interpreted as a couple is made clear by the fact that the woman has put her hand on the man's arm. Couples making music or singing together was in 17th-century art and literature a popular reference to love. In addition, the tuning of the lute by the musician on the left is intended as a symbol of harmony in marriage. Music was further believed to operate as a cure for sorrow. In the composition described here the pleasures of music and love are enhanced by the wine brought in by Bacchus.

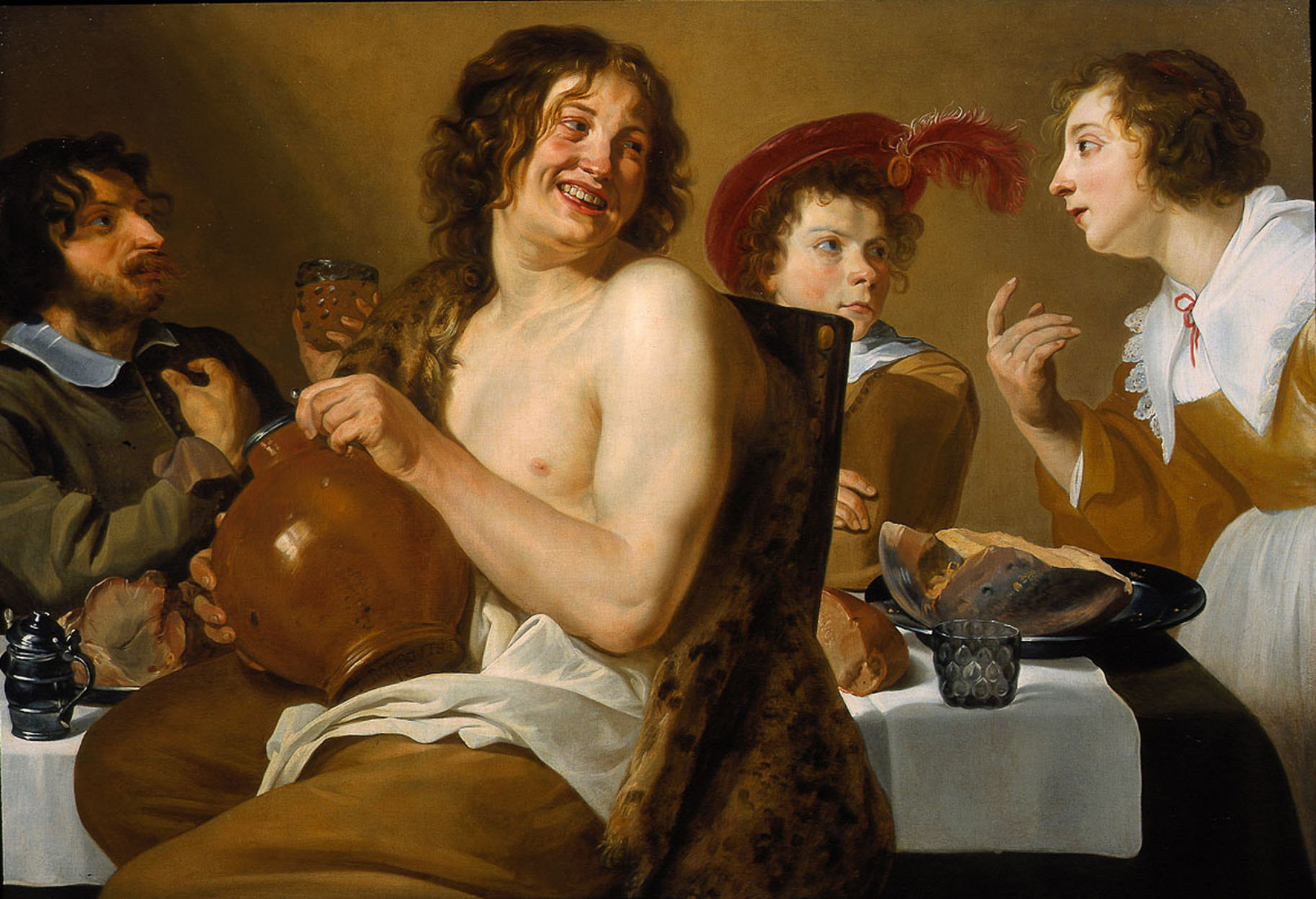
Figures eating and drinking around a table

Rombouts also collaborated with specialist painters in Antwerp for whom he typically painted the staffage in their compositions. Examples of such collaborations are the Kitchen (1630s, Hermitage Museum), a collaboration with still life painter Adriaen van Utrecht and The Holy Family (Royal Museum of Fine Arts Antwerp), a collaboration with landscape painter Jan Wildens.

=== Later work ===
The popularity of the Caravaggio movement lost steam after 1630. Rombouts abandoned chiaroscuro effects for more tempered lighting, smoother transitions and a lighter palette. A good example of this is The Mystical Marriage of Saint Catherina (Saint James's Church, Antwerp). This late style approaches the later work of Rubens, with whom he collaborated in the realization of the decorations for the Joyous Entry of Cardinal-Infante Ferdinand in Antwerp in 1635. A late work directly influenced by Rubens is the Descent from the Cross (1636, St Bavo's Cathedral, Ghent), which directly cites Rubens' treatment of the same subject of roughly two decades earlier (Antwerp Cathedral).
