= Juan de Solís =

Spanish painter and scenographer (c. 1598–1654)

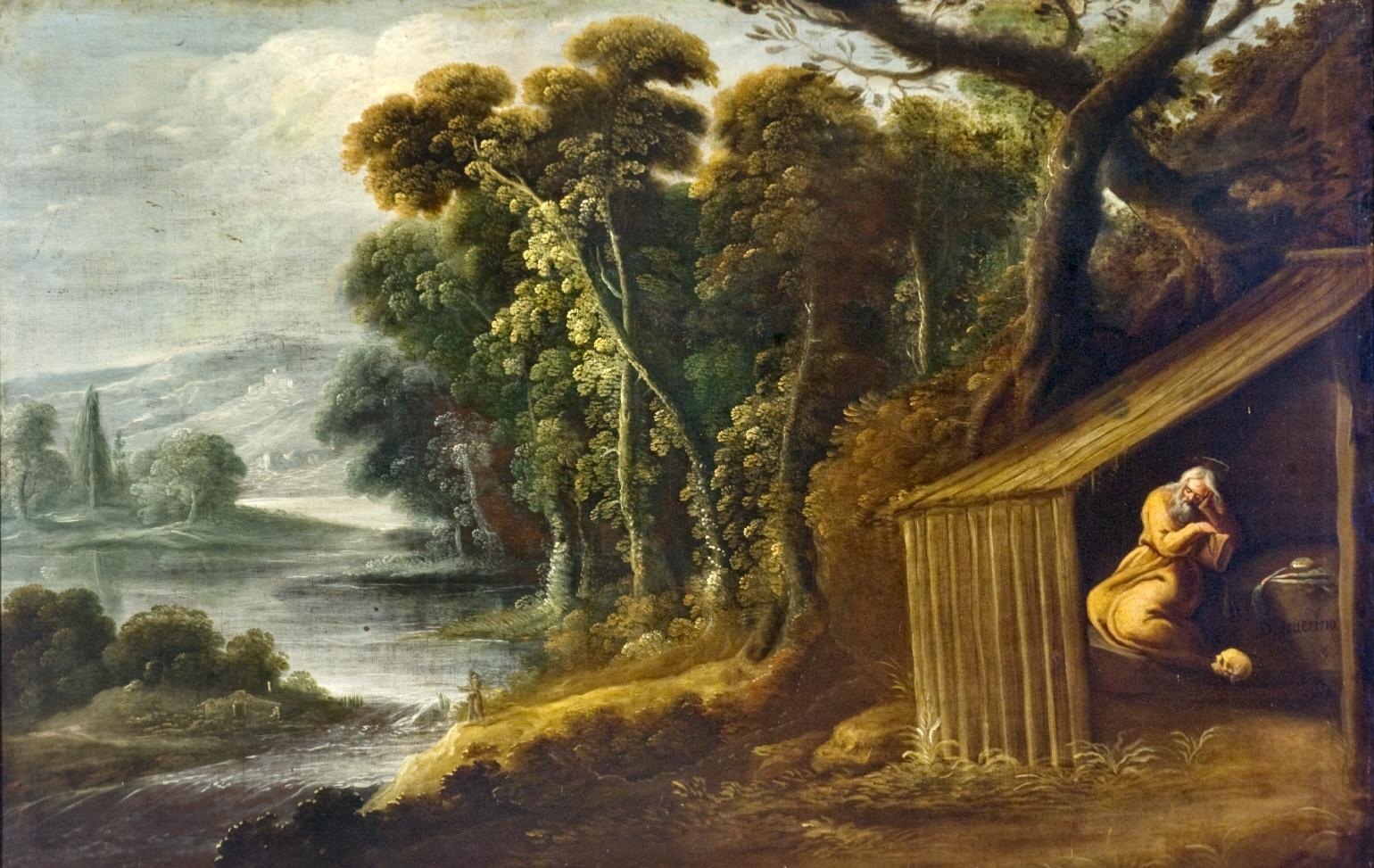
Saint Severian the Hermit

Juan de Solís (c.1598 - 30 September 1654, Madrid) was a Spanish painter and scenographer in the Baroque style. He spent much of his career in the service of King Philip IV. Only a few of his works have been preserved. His son, Francisco, also became a painter.

== Biography ==
According to a treatise by Antonio Palomino, Solís was born into a noble family. This has not been corroborated. Ceán Bermúdez says that he learned painting from Alonso de Herrera in Segovia. He was already established as a painter by 1630, when he took Juan de Arellano into his workshop as a student.

Around 1636, he began working as a court painter, creating stage decorations at the Buen Retiro Palace. He made his name in this genre with a series of scenes to celebrate a visit by Francesco I, the Duke of Modena. In 1637, he created a landscape with figures, including one of Bacchus, for Hermitage of La Magdalena at the palace. Such landscapes make up most of his work that has survived. Especially notable is a series depicting saints who were hermits.

In 1639, he was commissioned by Luis Fernández to gild the altarpiece, decorate the Camarín de la Virgen, and paint some angels in the lunettes at the Iglesia del Buen Suceso, which was demolished in 1854. A year later, he created some decorations for Buen Retiro, for which he was named "Painter to the Queen".

Another notable commission came from the Protonotary of Aragón, Jerónimo de Villanueva. This was a rendering of Saint Benedict and King Totila for the choir of the Convent of San Plácido. In 1647, as the Queen's painter, he signed a contract to decorate the chapel of Virgen del Amparo in Colmenar de Oreja.

By 1654, he was blind. Shortly before his death, he named his former student, Juan de Arellano, and the engraver, Pedro de Villafranca, as the executors of his estate. His assets were few.

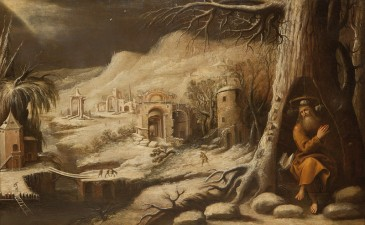
Winter Landscape with a Hermit
