= Maria Theresa van Thielen =

Dutch artist (1640–1706)

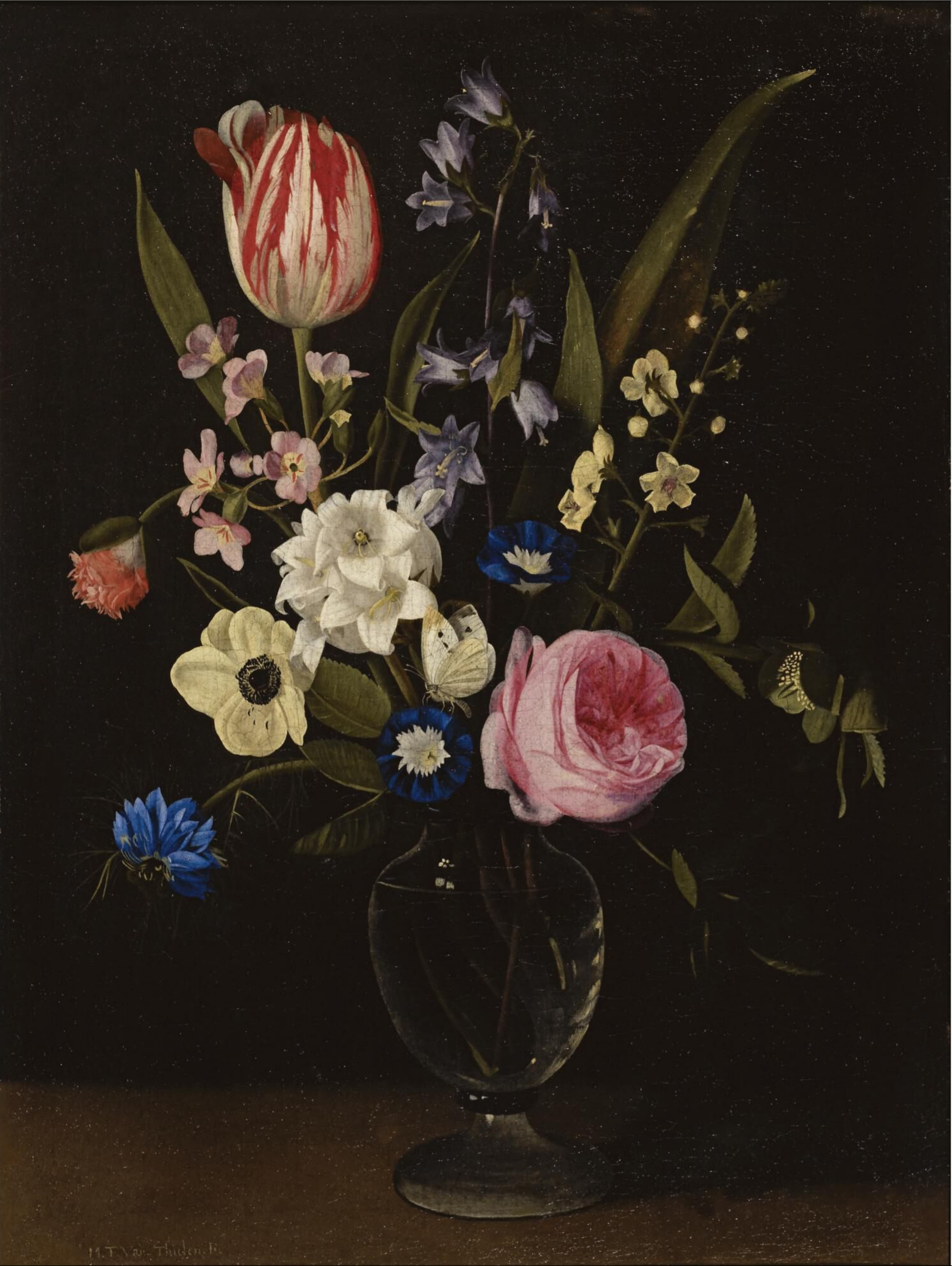
Still life with flowers in a glass vase on a ledge

Maria Theresia van Thielen (7 March 1640 – 11 February 1706) was a Flemish Baroque painter. She is known for several flower pieces and outdoor still lifes painted in the style of her father Jan Philip van Thielen.

== Biography ==
Maria van Thielen was born in Antwerp where she was baptized on 19 March 1640 in the parish of Onze Lieve Vrouw Noord. Her parents were Jan Philip van Thielen and Francisca de Hemelaer. Her father was a minor nobleman originally from Mechelen who had the title of Lord of Couwenberch. He was also a prominent still life painter active in Antwerp.

She had you younger two sisters Anna Maria and Francisca Catharina who also became painters and a brother Philippus. The three sister learned flower painting from their father. In 1660 the family moved back to Antwerp. Her sisters entered a convent in Muizen near Mechelen. Maria returned to Antwerp in 1665. It is unclear whether she should be identified with the Maria van Tienen who was admitted as a master 'afsetster' (someone who colored and added handwritten texts to maps, prints, atlases and books) in the Antwerp Guild of St. Luke in the guild year 1665–1666.

She never married and died in Antwerp where she was buried on 11 February 1706.

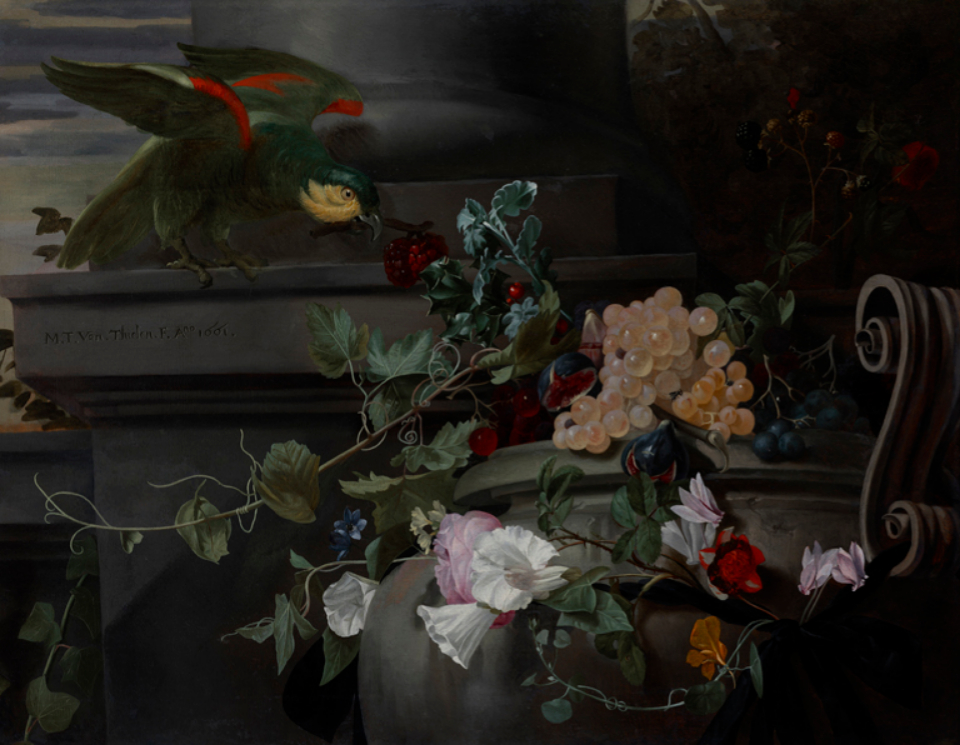
Still Life with a Parrot

== Work ==
Her known oeuvre is rather small, likely because art historians have attributed many of her unsigned paintings to her father. Maria's work is in the same style as her father.

She signed her works M.T.Van THIELEN.F. She painted two flower pieces in her father's style for the city hall of Mechelen, one of which is signed and dated 1664.
