= Juan de Arellano =

Spanish painter

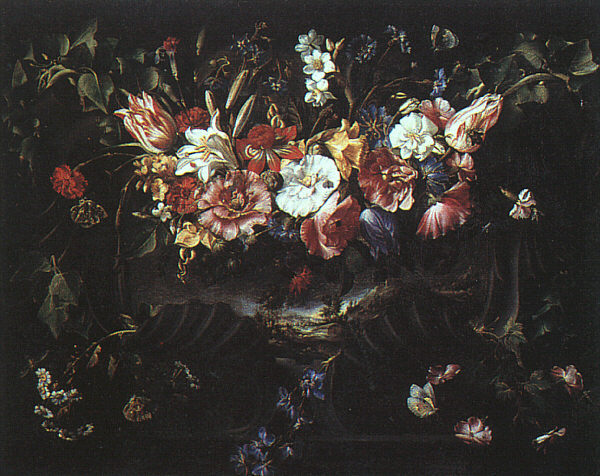
Juan de Arellano ~ Garland of Flowers with Landscape, oil on canvas, Museo del Prado, 1652

Juan de Arellano (3 August 1614 – 13 October 1676) was a Spanish painter of the Baroque era who specialized in floral still life paintings.

== Biography ==
Born in Santorcaz, near Madrid, where he died. He was a pupil of Juan de Solís. Heavily influenced by Flemish artists (such as Daniel Seghers) and Italian painters (such as Mario Nuzzi), Juan de Arellano was considered to be exceptional in this subject matter. According to one of his colleagues, de Arellano decided to focus exclusively on floral paintings because it offered more pay while requiring less work. Some of de Arellano's most famous pieces include Bouquet of Flowers (c.1660), and Garland of Flowers, Birds and Butterfly, currently on display at the Louvre. He also painted for the sacristy of the church of San Jerónimo el Real of Madrid. The Prado Museum houses an interesting repertoire. Another interesting set of still lifes is exhibited at The Royal Academy of Fine Arts of San Fernando, one other splendid Vases before a Mirror is exhibited at The Coruña Fine Arts Museum. A particularly ambitious still life belongs to the Bilbao Fine Arts Museum. The Museum Cerralbo holds a Concert of Birds with Flowers and another is attributed to it in the Museum of Romanticism in Madrid. Compare the term Naturaleza muerta or Bodegón for a description of one style of Spanish still life paintings.

== Works ==
- Vase of Flowers (first half of the 17th century)
- Small Basket of Flowers, oil on linen, 46.5 x 60.5 cm (c. 1650), Museum of Fine Arts in Bilbao
- Flowers in a Vase (1650)
- Still Life with Flowers (c. 1650-1670)
- Flowers on a Basket on a Plinth - two images (1664)
- Vase of Flowers - two images (1664)
- Vase of Flowers - different image (1668)
- Basket of Flowers (between 1668 and 1670)
- Basket of Flowers, oil on linen, 84.5 x 107 cm (1670), Museo del Prado, Madrid
- Small Basket of Flowers (1671)
- Basket of Flowers (1671)
- Basket of Flowers (between 1671 and 1673)
- Basket of Flowers (between 1675 and 1676). Biblioteca Museu Víctor Balaguer, Barcelona.
- still life of flowers with hollyhocks. Museum of Romanticism, Madrid.
- Concert of Birds with Flowers. Museum Cerralbo, Madrid.
- Vases before a Mirror. A Coruña Museum of Fine Arts.
- Still Life with sunflower and other flowers, birds, fruits and insects on a stone plinth. Royal Academy of Fine Arts of San Fernando, Madrid.
- Still Life with flowers, birds, fruits and insects on a stone plinth. Royal Academy of Fine Arts of San Fernando, Madrid.

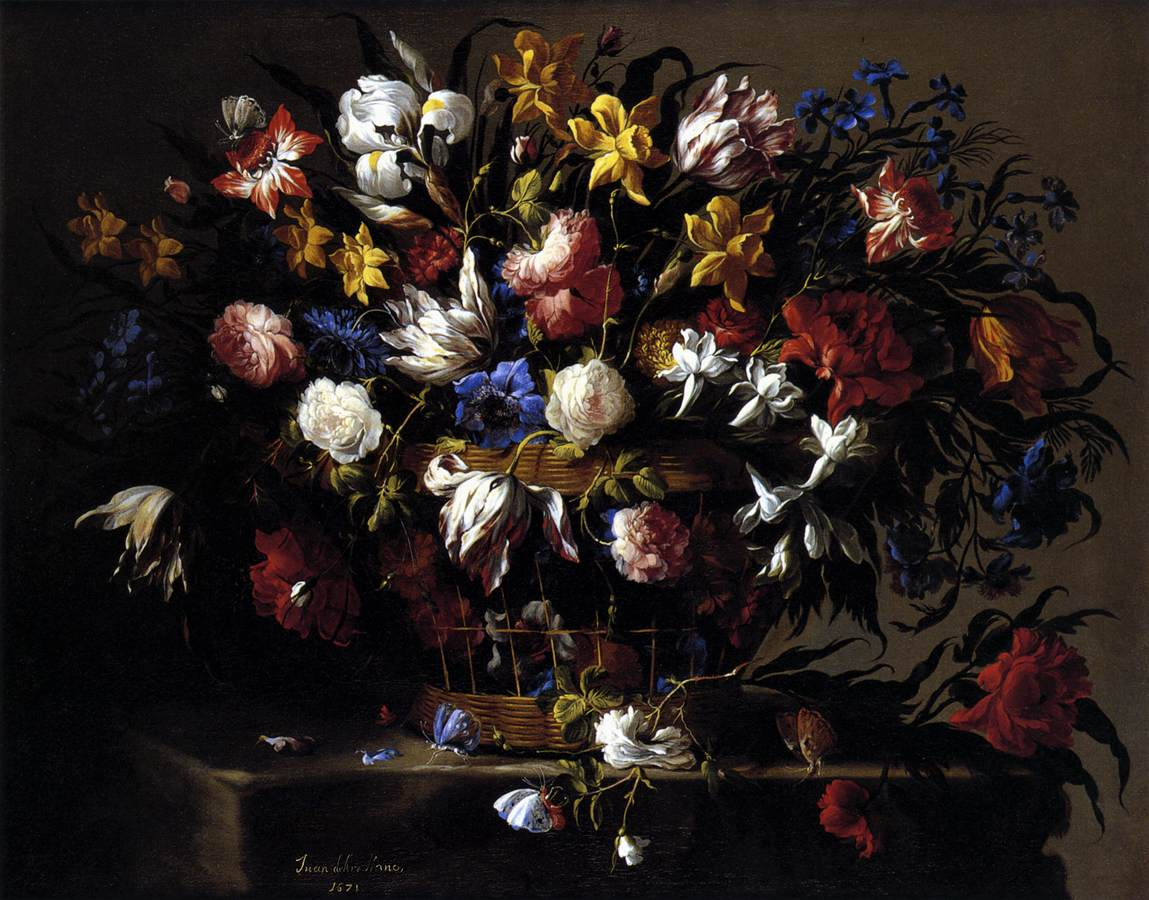
Small Basket of Flowers. Bilbao Fine Arts Museum.
