= Convento de los Agustinos Recoletos (Madrid) =

Convent in Madrid, Spain

Coordinates: 40.4236°N 3.6897°W

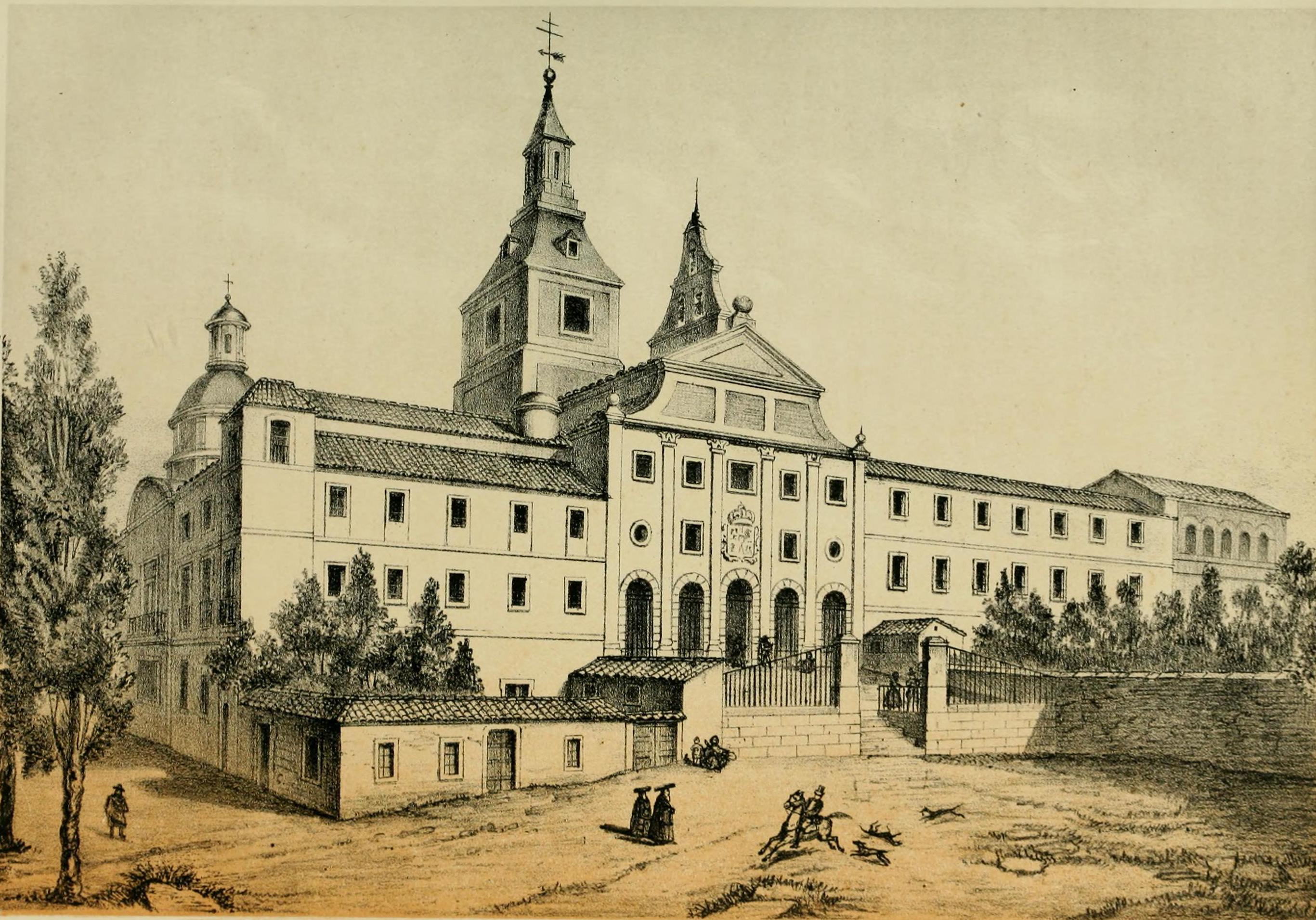
Convento de los Agustinos Recoletos or that de Copacabana. Madrid

The Convento de los Agustinos Recoletos or Convento de Copacabana, in the city of Madrid, was a convent located in the land now occupied by the National Library, the Museo Arqueológico Nacional, and several city blocks. This convent named the known Paseo de Recoletos of Madrid, name that refers to the Augustinian Recollects (Agustinos Recoletos), former owners of the convent and of the adjacent properties. In this convent the painter Francisco de Zurbarán was buried.

== History ==
The convent was founded on 1592, on a land in Prado Viejo that was donated by the Princess of Asculi, Doña Francisca de Guzmán, to the Augustinian Recollect. This was the fourth convent that the Recollects had in Spain.

At first, the Augustinians occupied the existing houses there. Later, at beginning of 17th century, they began the works of the new convent, which ended in 1620.

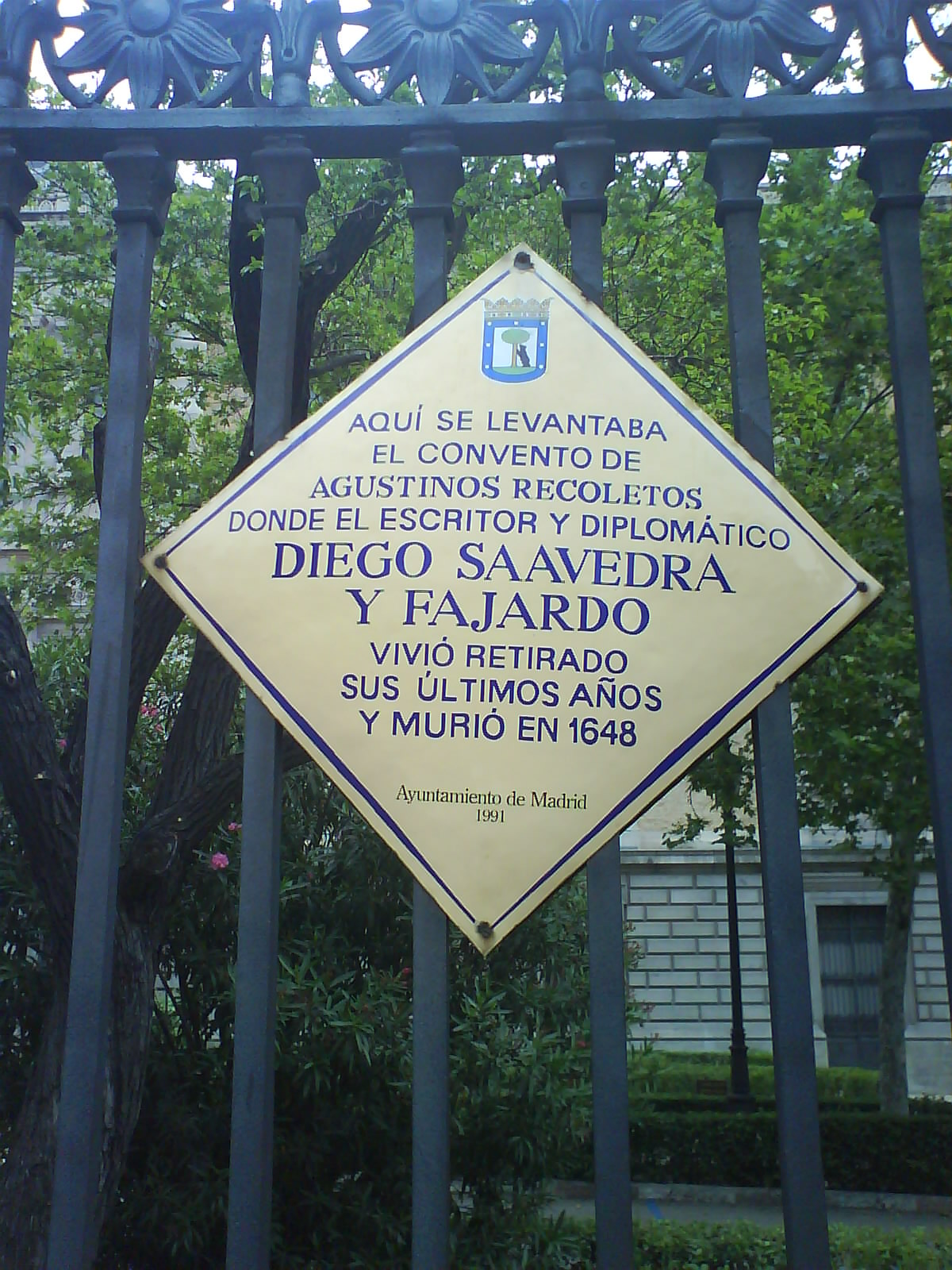
Plaque in memory to the Convent at the National Library of Spain's door.

In addition to the land donated by the founder, the monks bought surrounding orchards throughout the first half of the century, extending notably the length of the convent.

The works were commissioned to Luis de Valladolid, although according to some authors, Friar Juan de Nuestra Señora de la O and his son, Friar Lorenzo de San Nicolás, both brothers of the order, participated in its design.

In 1837 during the ecclesiastical confiscations of Mendizábal, the monks were expelled and the convent disentailed. It was Mendizábal himself who bought it at auction. Shortly after the convent was demolished.

== Description ==
=== The monastery ===
The convent buildings, such as refectory, cells, nursing, etc. were arranged around two courtyards. At its around it stretched the spacious gardens.

=== The convent ===
The main facade was structured vertically into streets, for the five arches that served as access to the church. A triangular pediment with central oculus crowned the set.

The church had the Spanish Baroque's characteristic plant: lounge floor, of a single nave with closed side chapels that formed spaces almost independent of the rest.

Among them, it must highlight the Chapel of Our Lady of Copacabana, which housed the image of the Patron saint of the Real Audiencia de Charcas in the Vicerroyalty of Peru brought by Friar Miguel de Aguirre in November 1662. Unlike related buildings, it was not conceived with burial for nobles, but as a gathering place for the community. It grew to such importance that ended up giving name to the convent (Convento de Copacabana). The exterior of the chapel was decorated with paintings by Francisco Herrera the Younger, Sebastián de Llanos y Valdés and Juan de Arellano, in the Chapel of the Virgin works by Luca Giordano and Luisa Roldán (La Roldana).
