= Daniel Seghers =

Flemish painter (1590–1661)

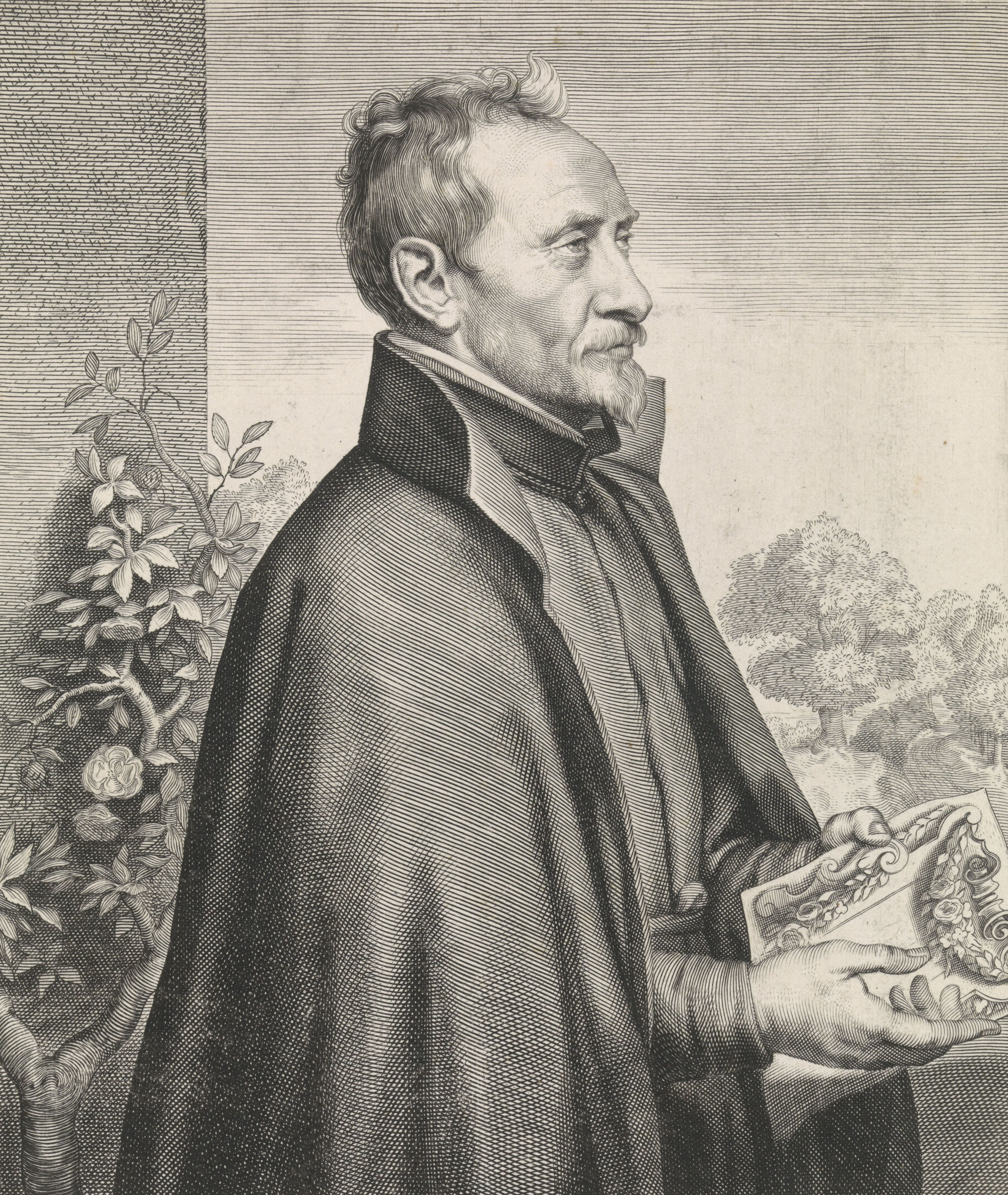
- Portrait of Seghers by Paulus Pontius
- Born: 3 December 1590; Antwerp, Duchy of Brabant
- Died: 2 November 1661 (aged 70); Antwerp, Duchy of Brabant

Daniel Seghers (Note: Other name variations include Daniël Seghers, Daniël Segers, Daniël Zegers and Daniël Zeghers) (3 December 1590 – 2 November 1661) was a Flemish Jesuit brother and painter who specialized in flower still lifes. He is particularly well known for his contributions to the genre of flower garland painting. His paintings were collected enthusiastically by aristocratic patrons and he had numerous followers and imitators.

== Life ==
Seghers was born in Antwerp. He moved with his mother to the Dutch Republic, probably Utrecht around 1601, following the death of his father Pieter and the conversion of his mother to Calvinism. He possibly started his initial training as an artist in Utrecht. The young artist returned to Antwerp by 1611, where he was enrolled in the Guild of Saint Luke as a pupil of Jan Brueghel the Elder.

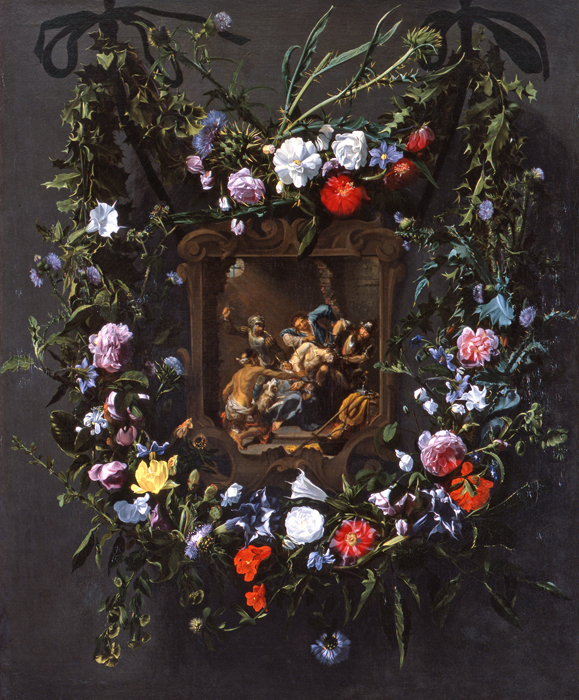
Garland of flowers surrounding a mocking of Christ, figures by Simon de Vos

Seghers re-converted to Catholicism and in 1614 he became a novice in the Jesuit order in Mechelen. In March 1614 Seghers joined the Sodaliteit der Bejaarde Jongmans (Society of Bachelors of Age), a fraternity for bachelors established by the Jesuit order. The Society's membership consisted principally of citizens from the elite and wealthy middle classes including artists and merchants. Through their membership of the Society, artists were able to access an important network of contacts which could benefit their careers. Seghers is recorded in Brussels in 1621 where he is known to have produced two flower garland paintings for the Cathedral of St. Michael and St. Gudula. In 1625 Seghers took his final vows as a Jesuit priest. Sources differ regarding his status in the Jesuit order: some claim that he was ordained a priest in 1625, while others argue that he remained a lay brother.

In 1625 Seghers left for Rome where he stayed for two years. In Rome, Seghers had the opportunity to work on projects with the leading painters: he collaborated with Nicolas Poussin on a few religious paintings, while for Cardinal Ludovisi, Seghers painted a flower garland around an oval cartouche filled with putti by the hand of the Italian painter Domenichino. The composition is referred to as Double wreath surrounding a medaillion with the triumph of love.

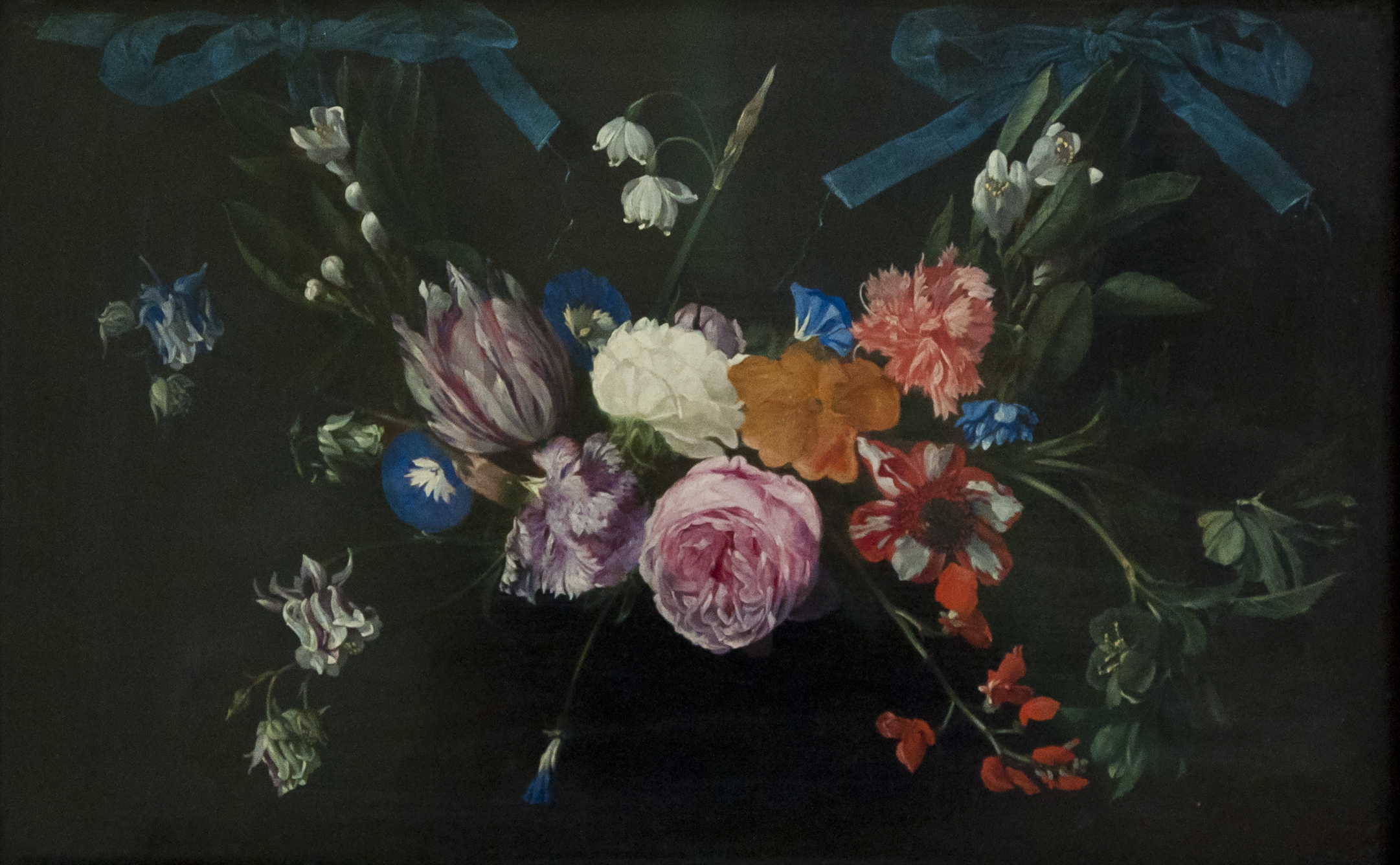
Flower garland

Seghers returned to his native city in 1627 where he continued to work as a painter for the remainder of his life. Seghers was visited in his studio in Antwerp by the Cardinal-Infante Ferdinand of Austria (in 1635), Archduke Leopold Wilhelm of Austria (in 1641), Queen Christina of Sweden and Charles II, King of England (both in 1649). He is known to have painted a cartouche of flowers for Charles II. His work was also much admired by his fellow artists, including Rubens.

His pupils included Jan Philip van Thielen, Ottmar Elliger and Ignace Raeth and likely also Andries Bosman.

== Work ==
=== General ===
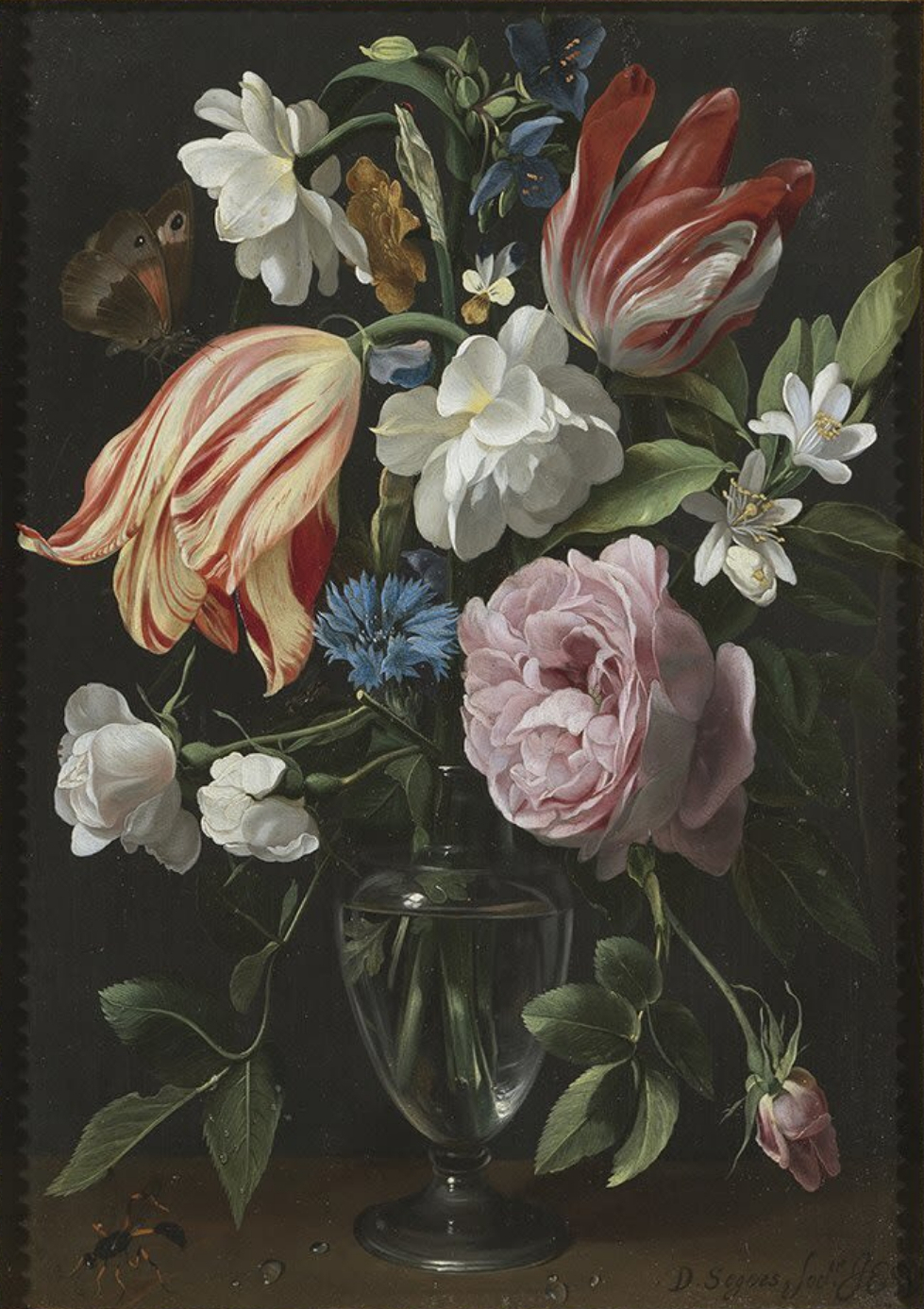
Flowers in a glass vase

Seghers was exclusively a flower painter, mainly of cartouches and flower garlands as well as pure flower paintings. He was very prolific and 239 works are currently attributed to the artist. It is not easy to establish a chronology for Seghers's paintings since he only dated his works in the period 1635–1651. Possibly there was a stylistic development in his flower garlands from the initial almost uniform garlands towards garlands composed of three or four groups of flowers. Stylistically, there is clearly in his early work a recognisable influence of Jan Brueghel the Elder. From 1630 on Seghers strived for a livelier painting of flowers in arrangements that look more natural. His flowers in this later period light up against a dark background and have a sculptural character.

Like his master Brueghel, Seghers used flowers and plants that grew in his home country and in particular cultivated garden flowers and he did not respect the blooming seasons of the flowers he painted together. He had a preference for locally-grown roses and tulips that are just about to bloom. In his detailed rendering of flowers and plants, Seghers betrayed the skill of a miniaturist.

Many of Seghers's paintings are oil on copper, a support often used for cabinet paintings.

=== Garland paintings ===
A majority of Seghers's work is in a distinctively Flemish genre, which is referred to as 'garland paintings'. Garland paintings are a special type of still life developed in Antwerp by Seghers's master Jan Brueghel the Elder in collaboration with the Italian cardinal Federico Borromeo at the beginning of the 17th century. Other artists involved in the early development of the genre included Hendrick van Balen, Andries Daniels, Peter Paul Rubens and Seghers himself. The genre was initially connected to the visual imagery of the Counter-Reformation movement. It was further inspired by the cult of veneration and devotion to Mary prevalent at the Habsburg court (then the rulers over the Southern Netherlands) and in Antwerp generally.

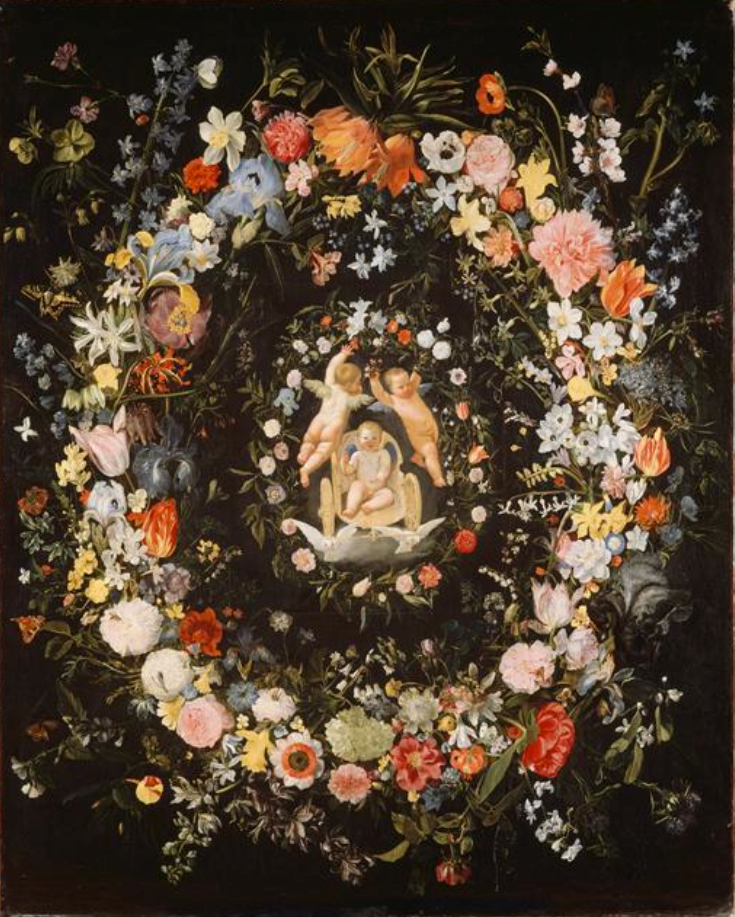
Double wreath surrounding a medaillion with the triumph of love

Garland paintings typically show a flower garland around a devotional image, portrait or other religious symbol (such as the host). By the second half of the century secular themes such as portraits and mythological subjects also decorated the central part of the many paintings made in this fashion. Seghers innovated the concept of his teacher Brueghel by including a stone cartouche as the framing elements for the flower garland. He also painted garland paintings of the Pietà in which the flowers were substituted by thistles, thorns, deadly nightshade and other noxious plants as a reference to crown of thorns and the suffering of Christ. An example is the early collaboration with Poussin (Musée Thomas-Henry) for which Poussin painted the Pietà figure and Seghers the garland.

Garland paintings were usually collaborations between a still life and a figure painter. Seghers himself generally only painted the flowers and the central subject was filled in later by another artist. This spirit of artistic collaboration, which was seen in the earliest flower garland paintings by Jan Brueghel the Elder and Peter Paul Rubens, is, in fact, a notable quality of Flemish painting in 17th-century Antwerp.

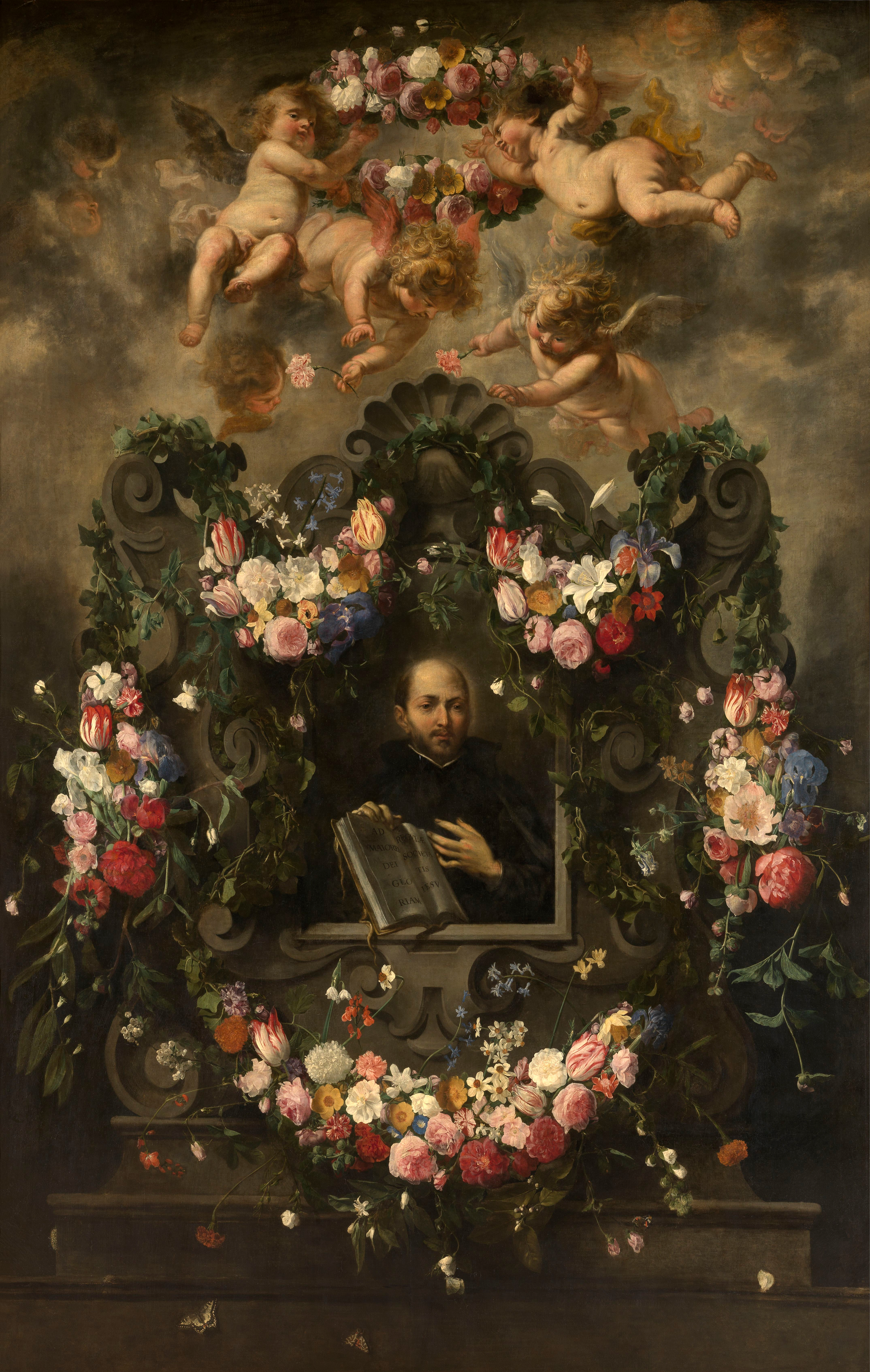
St. Ignatius in a cartouche with flowers and cherubs

While many of Seghers's collaborators on his garland paintings were anonymous local artists, he often collaborated with leading Antwerp figure painters. There is often uncertainty or disagreement about the identity of collaborators on specific artworks even though Seghers himself compiled a list of the flower still lifes, which he had painted and the patrons for whom he had painted them. In the catalogue he gave a description of each of his paintings, his collaborator and the number of paintings he produced. As the catalogue is incomplete, the collaborators are not always known with certainty. It is known he often worked with Cornelis Schut, Erasmus Quellinus II, Abraham van Diepenbeek, Simon de Vos, Jan van den Hoecke, Gonzales Coques and Rubens. Thomas Willeboirts Bosschaert is also mentioned as his collaborator. It is possible that Seghers collaborated with Rubens on a garland painting for the Saint Carolus Borromeus church in Antwerp. During his stay in Rome he also collaborated with Poussin and Domenichino.

Unlike in his later collaborations, Seghers is believed to have added flower garlands to existing paintings by Domenichino during his residence in Rome.

The garland paintings are often of a large size. The Saint Ignatius in a cartouche with flowers and cherubs, which measures about 190 to 299 cm and includes not only a cartouche painted by Cornelis Schut but also angels attributed to Jan van Balen.

=== Reception ===
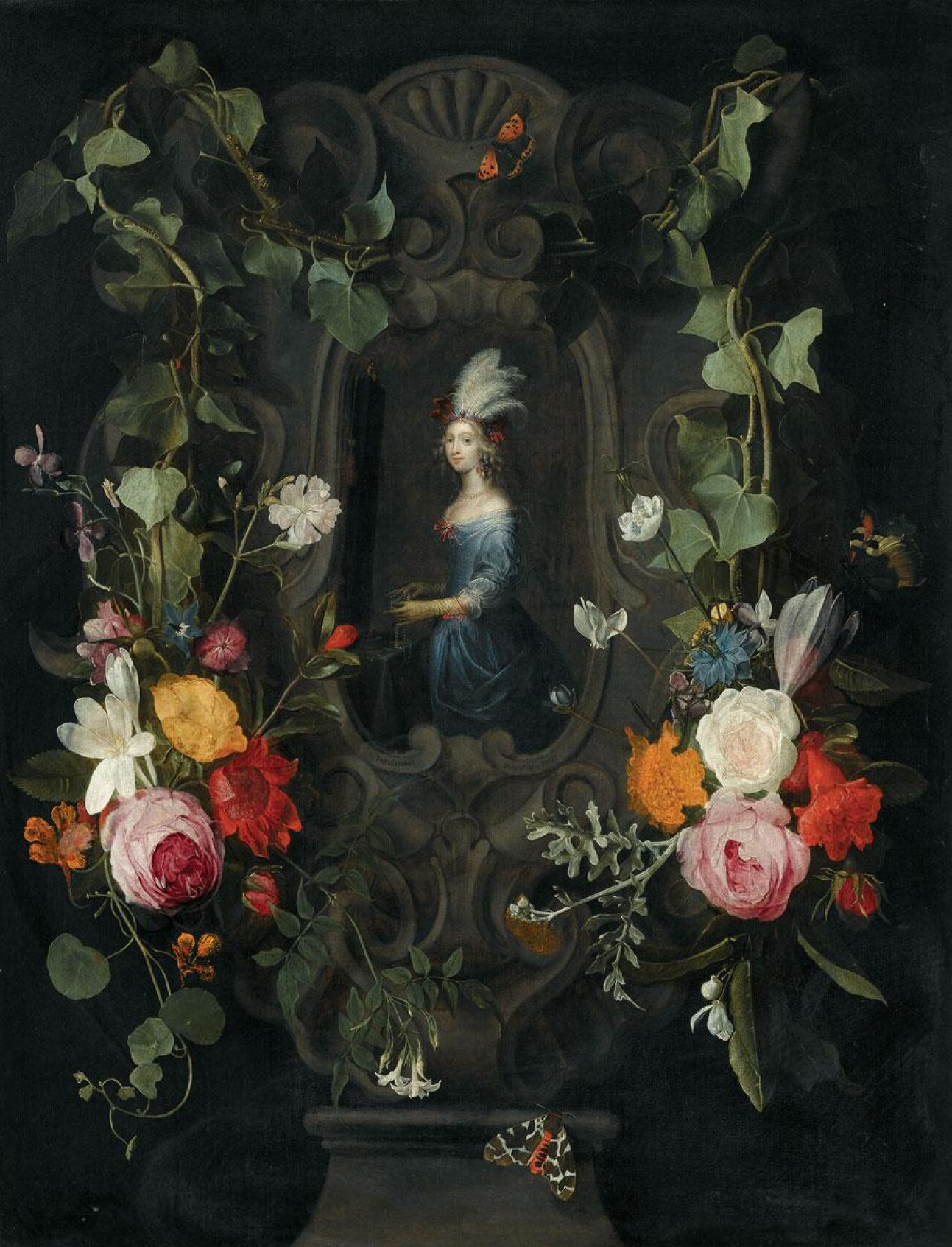
Garland of mixed flowers adorning a stone cartouche surrounding an allegory of vanity

Daniel Seghers's art was widely admired during his lifetime, generating great interest from collectors. His style was continued and followed by others including Jan Philip van Thielen, Andries Bosman, Jan Anton van der Baren, Frans Ykens and Jan van den Hecke. His work influenced artists such as Jan Davidsz. de Heem in Antwerp and Juan de Arellano in Madrid.

His paintings were highly prized and collected at the court of Frederik Hendrik in The Hague. There, the art collector and secretary to the prince Constantijn Huygens praised the paintings in poetry and corresponded numerous times with the artist, writing that one could almost smell the flowers. The Dutch poet Joost van den Vondel also wrote highly of Seghers's paintings. Other collectors included Christina of Sweden, Charles I, Philip IV of Spain, Maria de' Medici, Charles II, who visited the artist in 1649, and Archduke Leopold Wilhelm of Austria, the Italian collector Scipione Borghese and the Antwerp collector and patron of Anthony van Dyck, Cornelis van der Geest.

His paintings were usually not sold through traditional contacts such as art dealers, but were instead presented as gifts by the Jesuit order and used for the adornment of churches. They served as stimulants to religious contemplation and as powerful instruments of diplomacy. In 1631, for example, Seghers sent a painting of a Crown of Flowers to Marie de' Medici on the occasion of her visit, together with the Infanta Isabella, to the College of St. Ignatius. His compositions clearly carried a symbolic and devotional element, which was in line with the doctrines of the Jesuits.
