= Andries Daniels =

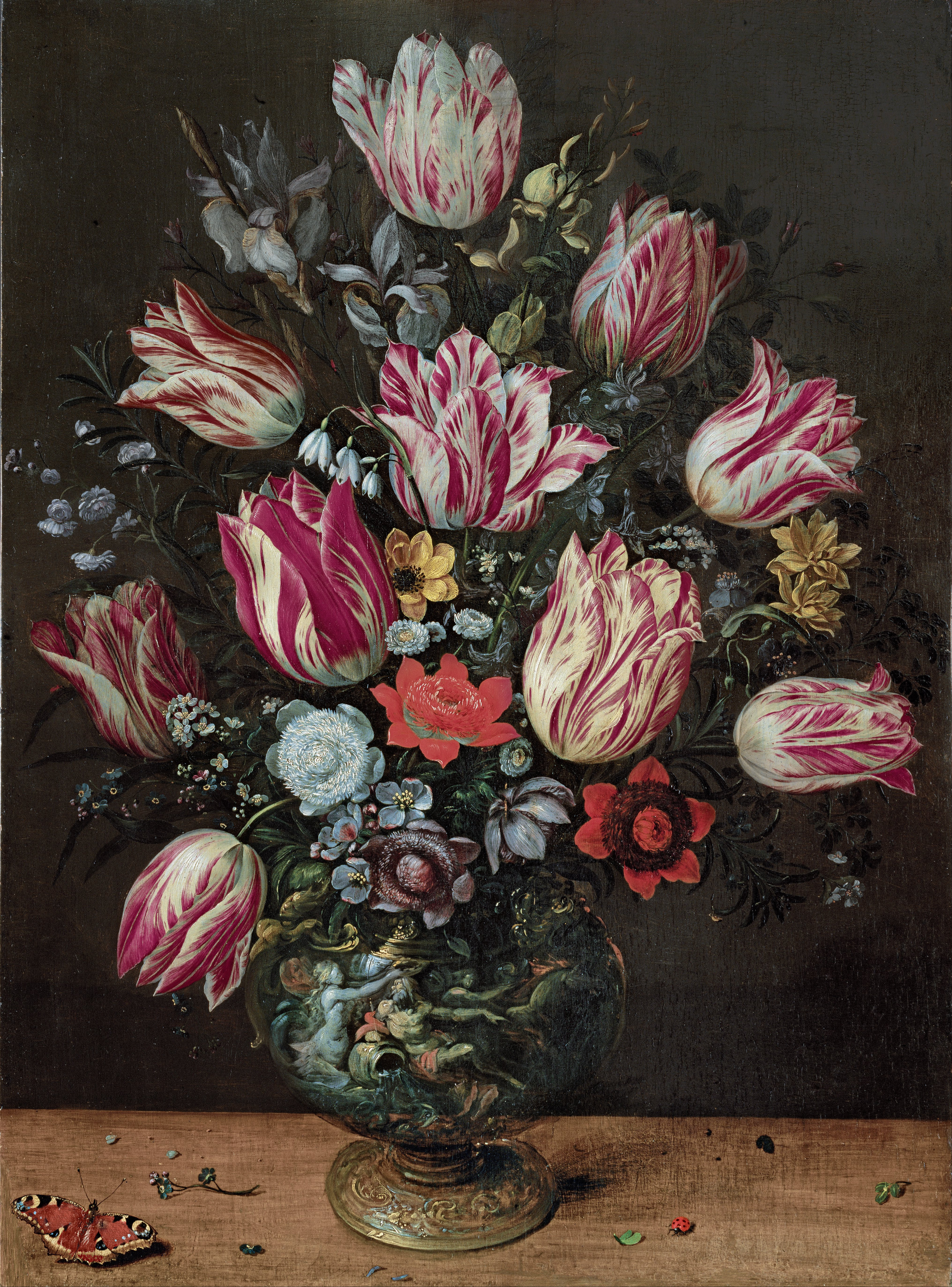
Vase with tulips

Andries Daniels ( c. 1580 – after 1640) was a Flemish painter who was active in Antwerp during the first half of the 17th century. He is known for his flower still lifes and garland paintings, a genre of still life paintings that he helped develop in Antwerp.

== Life ==
Little is known about Daniels' life. No records of the date and place of his birth or the names of his parents have been found to date.

He is first mentioned in 1599 when he is registered under the name Andries Daniels at the Antwerp Guild of Saint Luke. He was recorded as a pupil studying painting with Pieter Brueghel the Younger. Pieter Brueghel the Younger was the son of the prominent landscape and genre painter Pieter Brueghel the Elder and brother of Jan Brueghel the Elder, a prolific painter in many genres and a major contributor in the development of floral painting in Northern Europe. Daniels may have participated in copying works of Pieter Brueghel the Elder during his period of apprenticeship. In 1602 he was registered as a master of the Guild.

He executed a joint will with his wife Jozijnke van der Hoerst on 25 July 1640, which is the last record of his life. The date and place of his death are unknown.

== Work ==
=== General ===
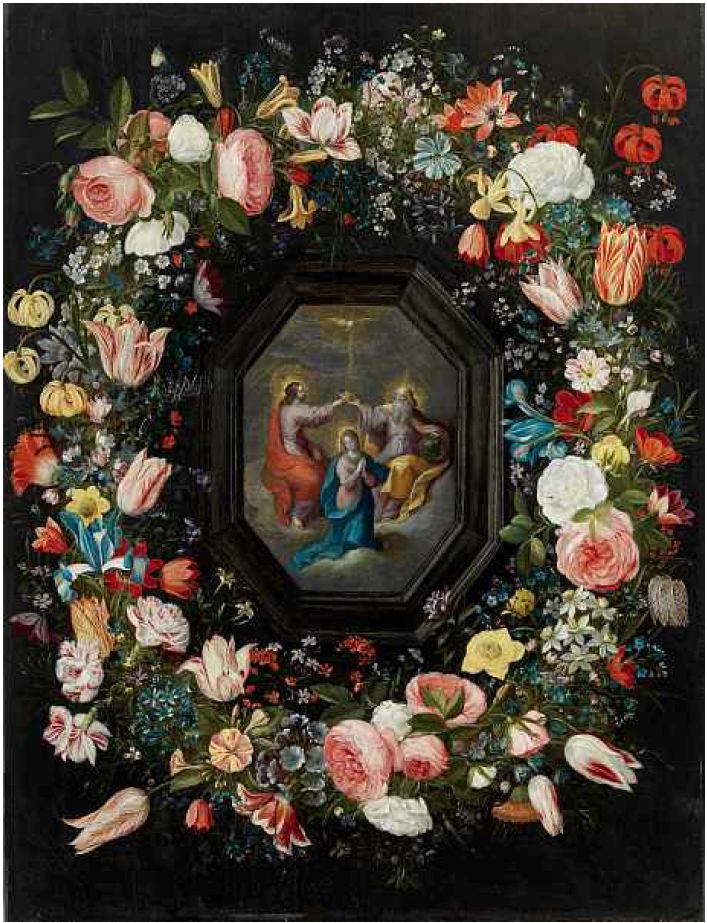
Flower garland surrounding a coronation of Mary

Daniels is known as a painter of still lifes, in particular still lifes of flowers in flamboyant vases, and flower garlands. Not many of his works are known as he was only rediscovered in the 1950s–1960s.

Only one signed painting, the Garland of Flowers around an Image of the Holy Family and Angels (current location unknown, at Galleria Lorenzelli, Bergamo in 1967) bearing the signature 'ANDRIES.DANIELS.F.' has been found so far. This work has been the basis for attributing additional works to the artist, in particular works previously attributed to Jan Brueghel the Elder. However, art historians do not agree on various attributions and earlier attributions have been contested subsequently. An example is the Garland of Flowers with Virgin and Child in the Hermitage Museum, the flower part of which was attributed to Daniels by Ingvar Bergström before 1966. This attribution has been challenged by Fred G. Meijer who found that the Hermitage painting's execution of the flowers is different from the handling of flowers in the signed painting. The attribution to Daniels of a Virgin and Child in a Garland of Flowers, (c. 1608, Biblioteca Ambrosiana, Milan) traditionally attributed to Jan Brueghel the Elder has also failed to find unanimous support among experts.

=== Flower pieces ===
Andries Daniels' flower pieces are close to those of the Antwerp painter Ambrosius Bosschaert the Elder to whom they have been attributed frequently. The composition, colour and lighting, however, call to mind the work of Jan Brueghel the Elder, the brother of Daniels' master Pieter Brueghel the Younger who was also famous for his flower still lifes. Although often a symbolic meaning has been attributed to the flower paintings, such as the vanitas meaning of the transience of worldly things, the principal aim of the artist in these works is to create a convincing illusionistic effect.

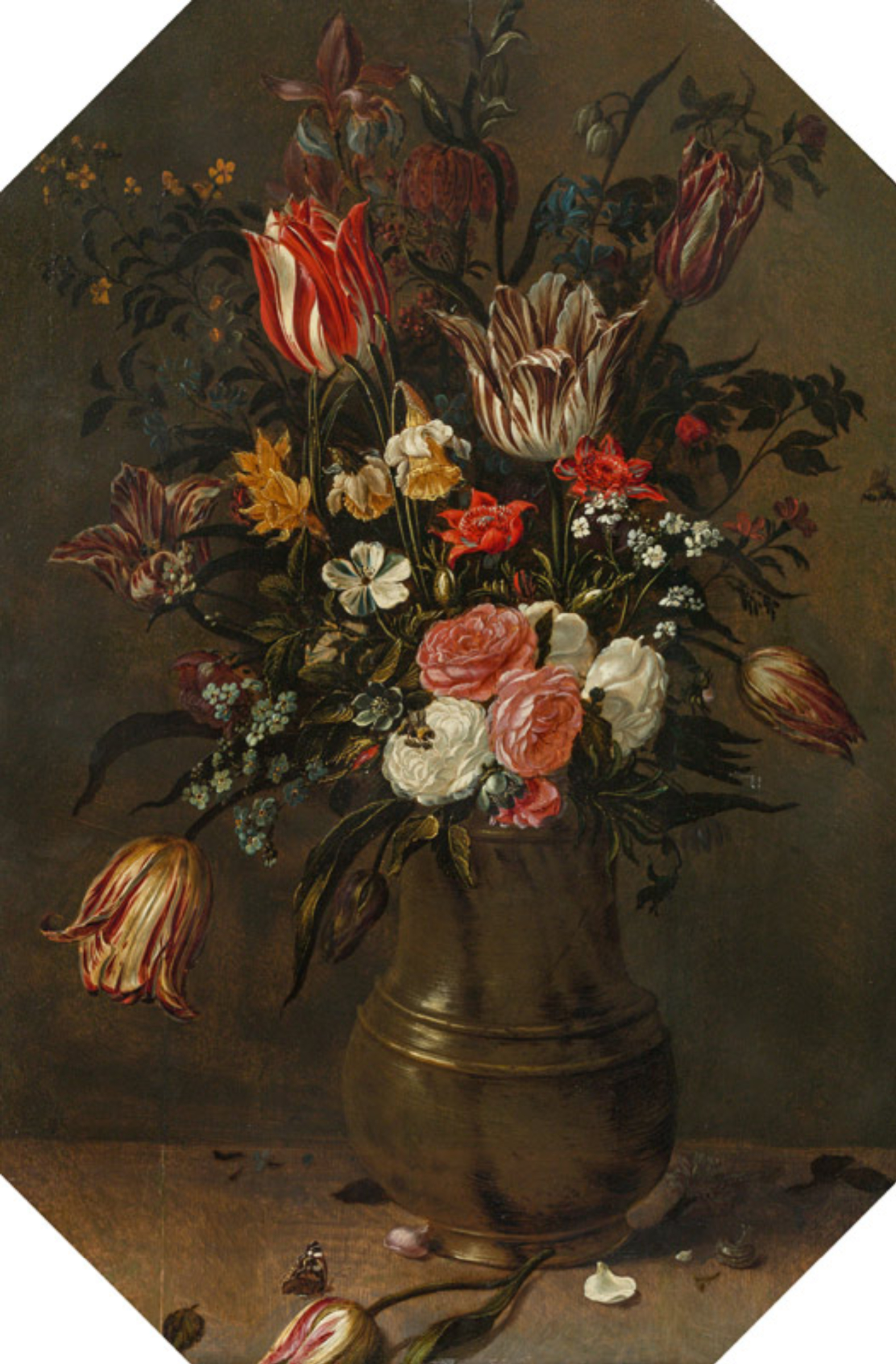
Bouquet of flowers in a metal jug

In the tradition of other Antwerp flower paintings, Daniels did not paint the flower bouquets directly from life. His bouquets are often made up of flowers which bloom in different seasons and the stems of some of the smaller flowers are ostensibly extended so that they can match up with the taller flowers. The bouquets were in fact created by using studies of individual blooms created at the time when the flowers where in season or copied from other sources. He used these models as aids when composing floral arrangements in his compositions. As a result of this common practice, very similar flowers appear in multiple paintings and flowers painted by one artist sometimes turn up in work of a different artist.

As was common in Antwerp artistic practice in the 17th century, Daniels often teamed up with another specialist painter to create collaborative works. An example of this is the Vase with tulips (1620–25, Bilbao Fine Arts Museum). In this work, Daniels painted the flowers while the Antwerp figure painter Frans Francken the Younger painted the sculpted vase. Frans Francken the Younger was a leading artist in Antwerp in his time and operated a large workshop which produced high quality autograph works for the luxury market as well as mass-produced paintings for a lower market segment. It is believed that the numerous vases of flowers and garlands around figures and vases of flowers, that are traditionally attributed to Francken and Daniels are likely the work of Francken's studio. Daniels may have been an employee in Francken's workshop. The fact that he was permitted to sign one of his own compositions shows that he likely enjoyed a privileged position.

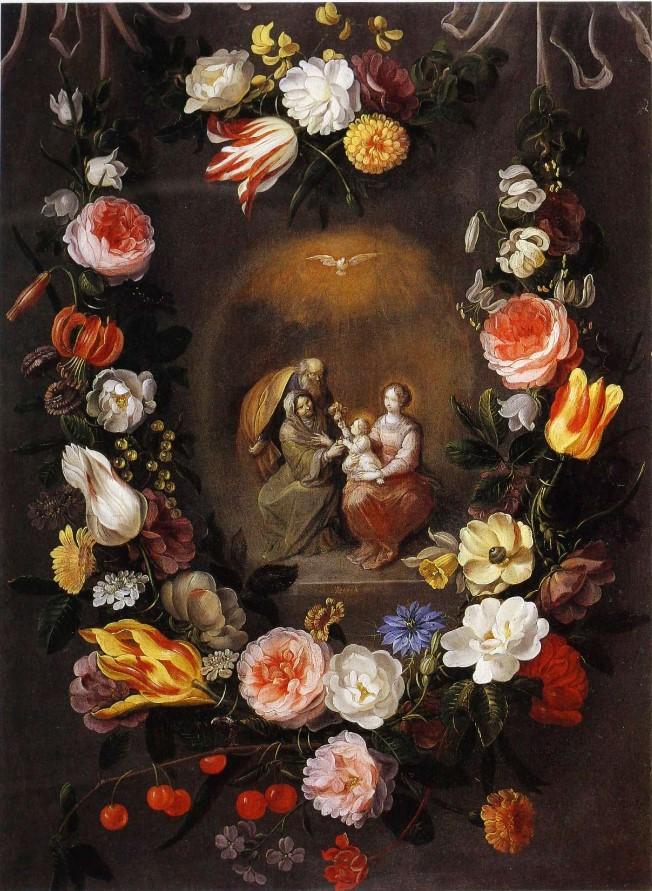
Holy Family with St. Anne in a Garland of Flowers

=== Garland paintings ===
Daniels played a role in the development of the genre of garland paintings. Garland paintings are a special type of still life developed in Antwerp by artists such as Jan Brueghel the Elder, Hendrick van Balen, Frans Francken the Younger, Peter Paul Rubens and Daniel Seghers. They typically show a flower garland around a devotional image or portrait. This genre was inspired by the cult of veneration and devotion to Mary prevalent at the Habsburg court (then the rulers over the southern Netherlands) and in Antwerp generally.

Garland paintings were usually collaborations between a still life and a figure painter. Daniels collaborated with other artists such as Frans Francken the Younger and Jacob Jordaens, who would paint the devotional images while Daniels painted the flowers and flower garlands in the picture.

Together with Frans Francken, he further developed the genre of garland paintings, creating many special forms, among them garlands around medallions with the decades of the rosary.
