= D'Hondecoeter =

d'Hondecoeter is a surname. Notable people with the surname include:

- Gijsbert d'Hondecoeter (1604–1653), Dutch painter
- Gillis d'Hondecoeter (c. 1575–1638), Dutch painter, father of Gijsbert
- Melchior d'Hondecoeter (c. 1636–1695), Dutch painter
