= Josina Margareta Weenix =

Dutch artist

Josina Margareta Weenix (ca. 1674-1724) was a Dutch artist specialising in paintings of flowers.

== Early life ==
Josina Margareta Weenix was born in 1674 or 1675. Her father was Jan Weenix and she was granddaughter of Jan Baptist Weenix.

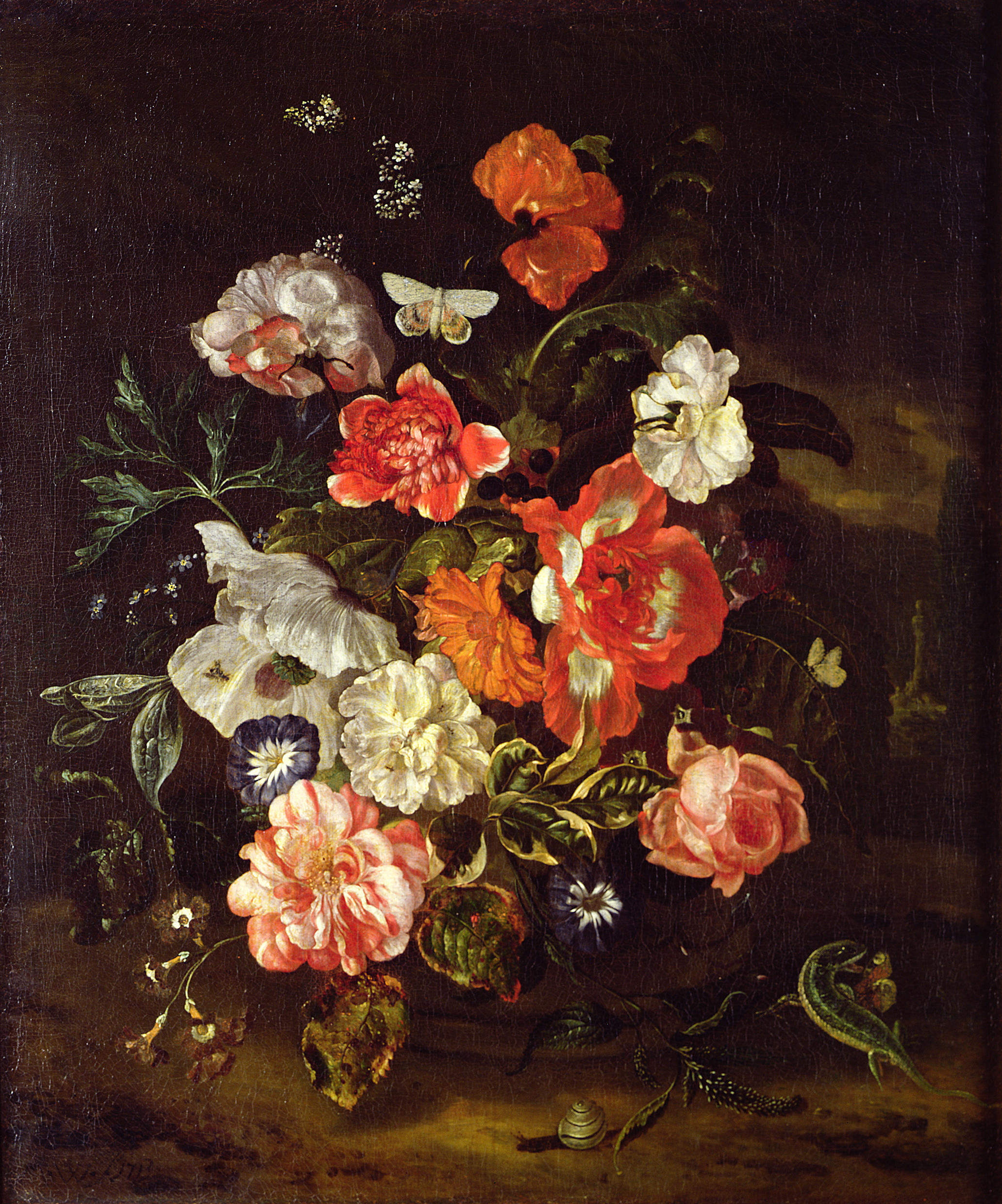
Flower Piece - Josina Margareta Weenix - 216 1970

== Painting ==
By 1706, Weenix's paintings were being sold in Amsterdam. Her style was sufficiently similar to that of her father that some paintings were subsequently misattributed to the older painter or to his daughter Maria.

Her work is held in the Fitzwilliam Museum, Cambridge,, the Museum of Fine Arts, Ghent and the Royal Albert Memorial Museum, Exeter.

== Personal life ==
In November 1716, Josina married Pieter van der Stoot in Amsterdam. In 1723, the couple had a son. Weenix died in 1724, and was buried in Amsterdam.

== Works ==
- Flowers before a garden with architectural features (1713)
- Flower Piece (1713)
