= Charles Collins (painter) =

Irish painter

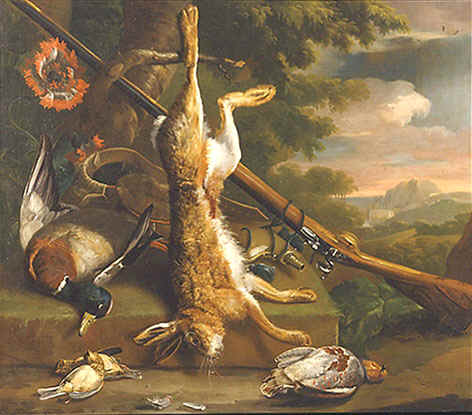
Still Life with Game, oil on canvas, signed 1741

Charles Collins (c. 1680 – 1744) was an Irish painter. Collins was primarily a painter of animals and still life. He was one of the first still life artists in Britain of great quality, following the tradition of arranged breakfasts, still-lives or cabinets of curiosities, where items of high value and ostentation were painted.

== Life ==
Born in Dublin around 1680 or potentially as late as 1704. Very little biographical detail is known about him. Collins worked in both oil and watercolour and appears to have exclusively produced still-lives, with game a reoccurring subject. His work shows an influence of 17th century Dutch painters such as Jan Weenix, Franz Snyders and Jan Fyt which has led to the suggestion that he may have spent time or been trained in the Netherlands.

In 1732 he painted Twelve Months of Fruit for Robert Furber. He worked with John Lee in 1736 to produce 12 large engravings titled Icones avium cum nominibus anglicis, featuring Britrish birds in gardens and landscapes. This led to Collins collaborating with Peter Paillou to produce a series of watercolours of British birds and mammals for Taylor White, a collector. Collins produced 201 signed works for White, including a study of a Dodo, and some unsigned mammal studies. All of his bird paintings featured a tree stump or grassy mound, and Collins attempted to make the birds appear in life and active. These works were produced between 1737 and 1739.

He died in London in 1744. At the time of his death he was described as "Bird Painter to the Royal Society". In 1786, he was referred to as an "Irish Master" by Dublin Evening Post and in 1782 a sale catalogue held him as an equal to Melchior d'Hondecoeter.

== Legacy ==
His works had largely fallen into obscurity until the Tate Gallery in London purchased his Still Life with a Lobster on a Delft Dish (1738) in 1981 which led to renewed interest in his life and work. Nine of his set of 12 original oil paintings, Icones avium cum nominibus anglicis, are held by Anglesey Abbey, Cambridgeshire and 3 are in a private collection in Ireland. Blacker Wood Library at McGill University, Montreal, Quebec hold the largest collection of his work, from the White collection. His work is also held in the British Museum, City of Birmingham Museum and Art Gallery, the National Gallery of Ireland, Leeds City Art Gallery, and the Minneapolis Institute of Arts.
