= Cat among roosters =

Painting by Jacob Bogdani

- Mačka medzi kohútmi (Slovak), Котка сред петли (Bulgarian)
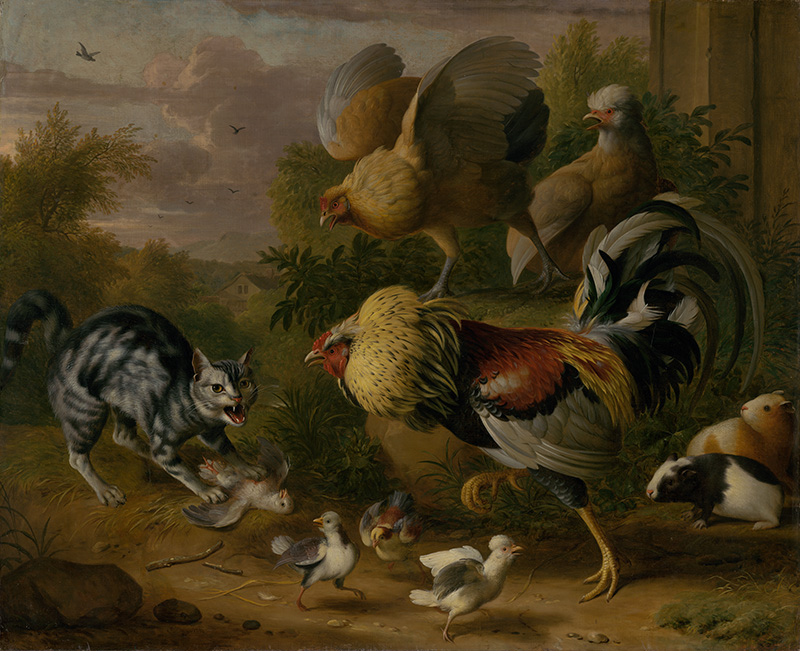
- Artist: Jakob Bogdani
- Year: 1710
- Medium: oil on canvas
- Dimensions: 103.5 cm × 126 cm (40.7 in × 50 in)
- Location: Slovak National Gallery; Bratislava

Cat among roosters (in Slovak: Mačka medzi kohútmi) is a painting by the Slovak artist Jakob Bogdani from the period 1706–1710.

== Description ==
It is painted with oil on canvas and has dimensions of 103.5 x 126 cm.

The picture is part of the collection of the Slovak National Gallery in Bratislava.

== Analysis ==
The picture presents an animal scene typical of the Baroque period in Europe and especially in the Dutch art of the 17th century. The work is full of realistic details, highlighting the struggle for life of a little chicken attacked by a cat. In the lower left corner is the signature of the artist. The painting is part of a golden selection since the early years of the artist, which he spent in northern Slovakia, are almost unknown. Jakob Bogdani came from an aristocratic Protestant family. From 1684 he painted many paintings of flowers in central Amsterdam. In 1689, he moved to England where he worked as a royal painter to William III of Orange. He is well known for his depiction of birds.
