= Tobias Stranover =

Transylvanian-born painter

- Born: 1684; Hermannstadt, Transylvania, Kingdom of Hungary, Habsburg Empire
- Died: 1756 (aged 71–72); London

Tobias Stranover or Toby Stranovius (1684–1756) was a Transylvanian Saxon born painter (1684–after 1731).

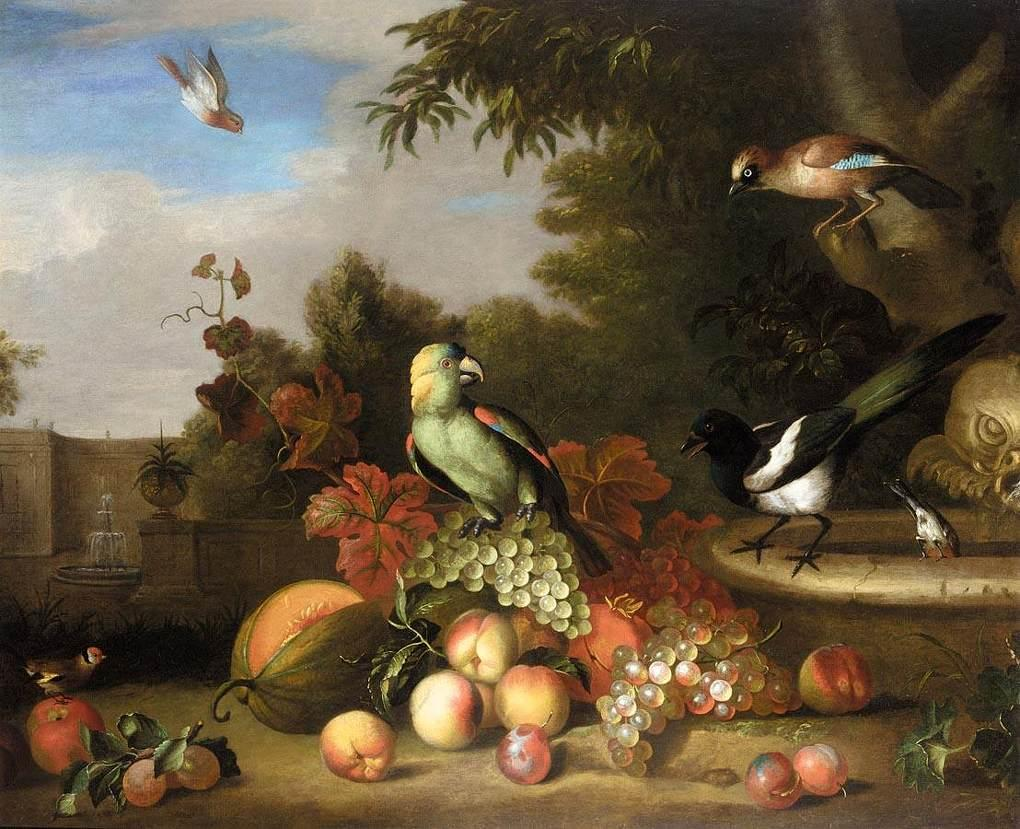
Still life with fruit and birds

Stranover was born in Hermannstadt but travelled to the Holy Roman Empire, the Dutch Republic, and England, where he stayed. He is registered in Hamburg, Hermannstadt, Amsterdam and London. He became a follower of the bird painter Melchior d'Hondecoeter and presumably also Jakob Bogdány, whose daughter Elisabeth he married. Stranover arrived in England around 1703, shortly after his father's death, and married Elisabeth, the daughter of the bird and flower painter Jakob Bogdány. The two artists collaborated closely — repeated use of the same exotic bird species and fruits suggests a shared studio or regular joint commissions. When Bogdány died in 1724, he left Stranover and his wife his house at Finchley along with his bird models and studio contents. By the early 18th century, Stranover and Bogdány were among the most prominent decorative painters working in England, known for exotic bird and animal paintings with a lightness and freshness unusual for the period.

Stranover died in London .
