= Marmaduke Cradock =

English painter

Marmaduke Cradock (1660 – 24 March 1716) was an English painter of birds and other animals. Some older sources give his first name as Luke but this may be in error. Self taught, he produced art works that were rarely signed.

== Life ==
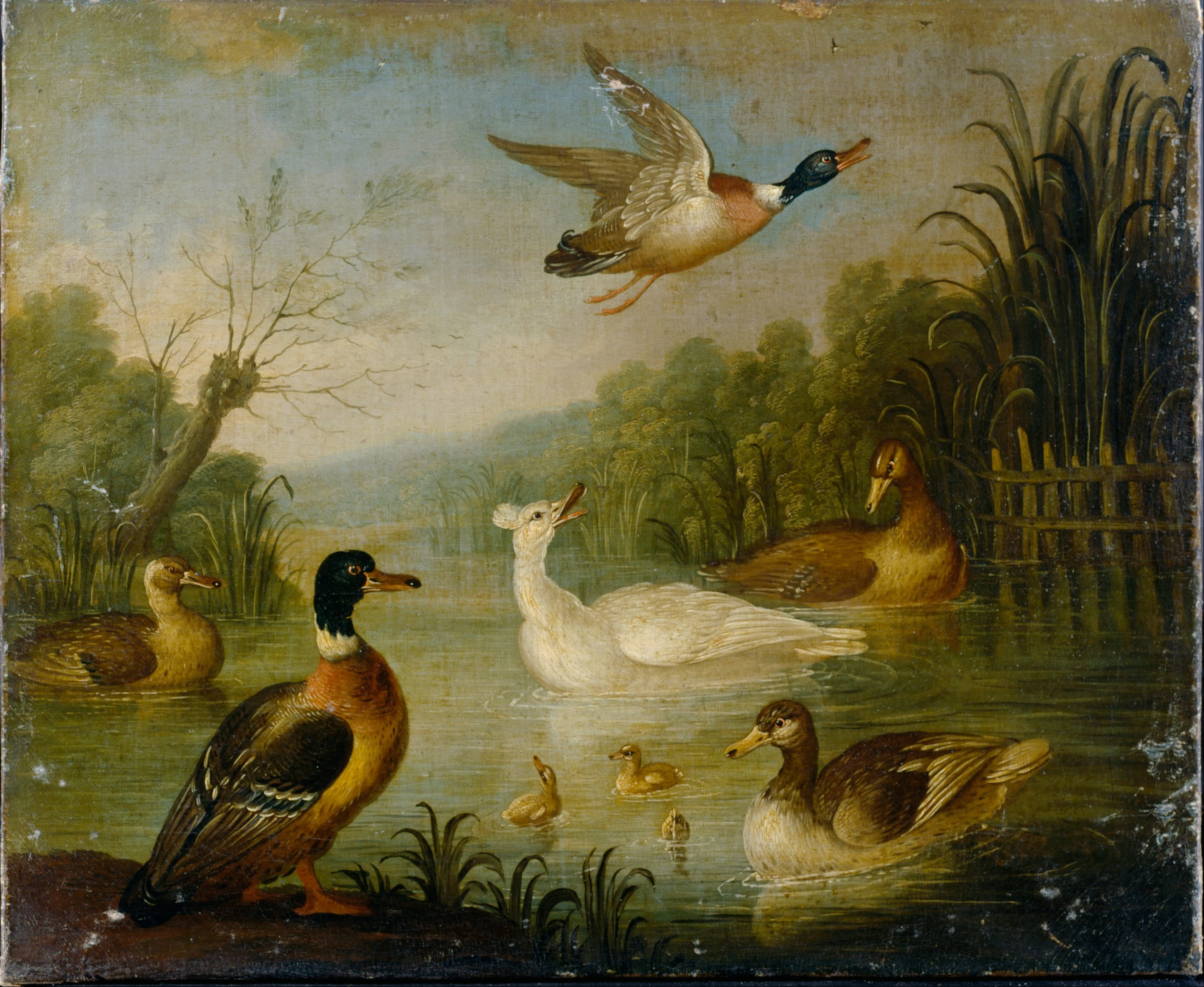
Mallards on a Pond (Dulwich Picture Gallery)

Cradock was an English painter, noted for his depictions of birds, dead game, and other animals. He was born in Somerton, Somerset and moved to London, where he served an apprenticeship to a house-painter. He was, however, self-taught as an artist, becoming skilled in the depiction of birds and animals. Horace Walpole wrote that "I have seen some pieces by his hand which he painted with a freedom and a fire that entitled them to more distinction".

According to Walpole, Cradock deliberately shunned aristocratic patronage.

He worked in general by the day, and for dealers who retailed his works; possessing that conscious dignity of talent which made him hate to be employed by men whose birth and fortune confined his fancy, and restrained his freedom.

== Work ==
According to the RKD his work as a still life and bird painter was influenced by Melchior d'Hondecoeter, Peter Frans Casteels, and Jakob Bogdani.

Sketches in the collection of the British Museum indicate that he based at least some of the birds in his paintings on drawings from life. He tended to paint domestic birds and common wild species, rather than the exotic varieties favoured by some other artists. He sometimes introduced elements of drama such as attacks by predatory animals into his bird paintings, a feature shared with the works of Francis Barlow. Buyers of his paintings often incorporated them into schemes of interior decoration, setting them into panelling above doors or fireplaces.

His Peacock and Other Birds in a Landscape is in the collection of the Tate Gallery. It is only one of three known signed works by him.

== Death ==
He died in London in 1716, and was buried at St Mary, Whitechapel. Soon afterwards some of his works were sold at three or four times the price he had received for them in his lifetime.
