= Jakob Bogdani =

Hungarian-British painter

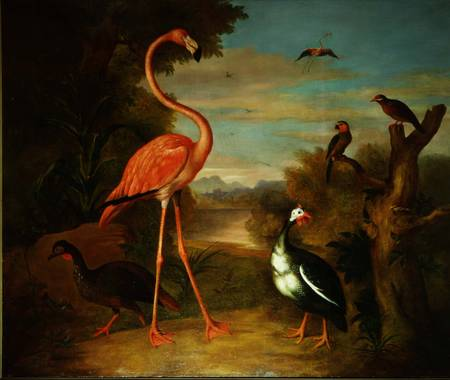
Flamingo and Other Birds in a Landscape

Jakob Bogdani (6 May 1658 - 11 November 1724), whose names are sometimes spelt Jacob and Bogdány, was a Hungarian and British artist well known for his still life and exotic bird paintings.

== Biography ==
Bogdani was born in the city of Eperjes, today Prešov, Slovakia, then in Sáros County in the north of the Kingdom of Hungary as the son of painter Lucas Bogdani. In 1684 he went to Amsterdam where he lived and worked until moving to London in 1688.

In Amsterdam he got acquainted with fellow Hungarian letter cutter and typographer Miklós Tótfalusi Kis, also studying in the Netherlands. In London he found success as a specialist still life and bird painter at the court of Queen Anne, and several of his paintings became part of the Royal Collection. One of his chief patrons was Admiral George Churchill, brother of the Duke of Marlborough, whose famous aviary at Windsor Park may have supplied subjects for some of his paintings.

Bogdani married Elizabeth Hemmings with whom he had two children, William, who became a prominent British civil servant, and Elizabeth, who married the painter Tobias Stranover. He influenced the bird painter Marmaduke Cradock. He died in Finchley, north London.

== Paintings ==
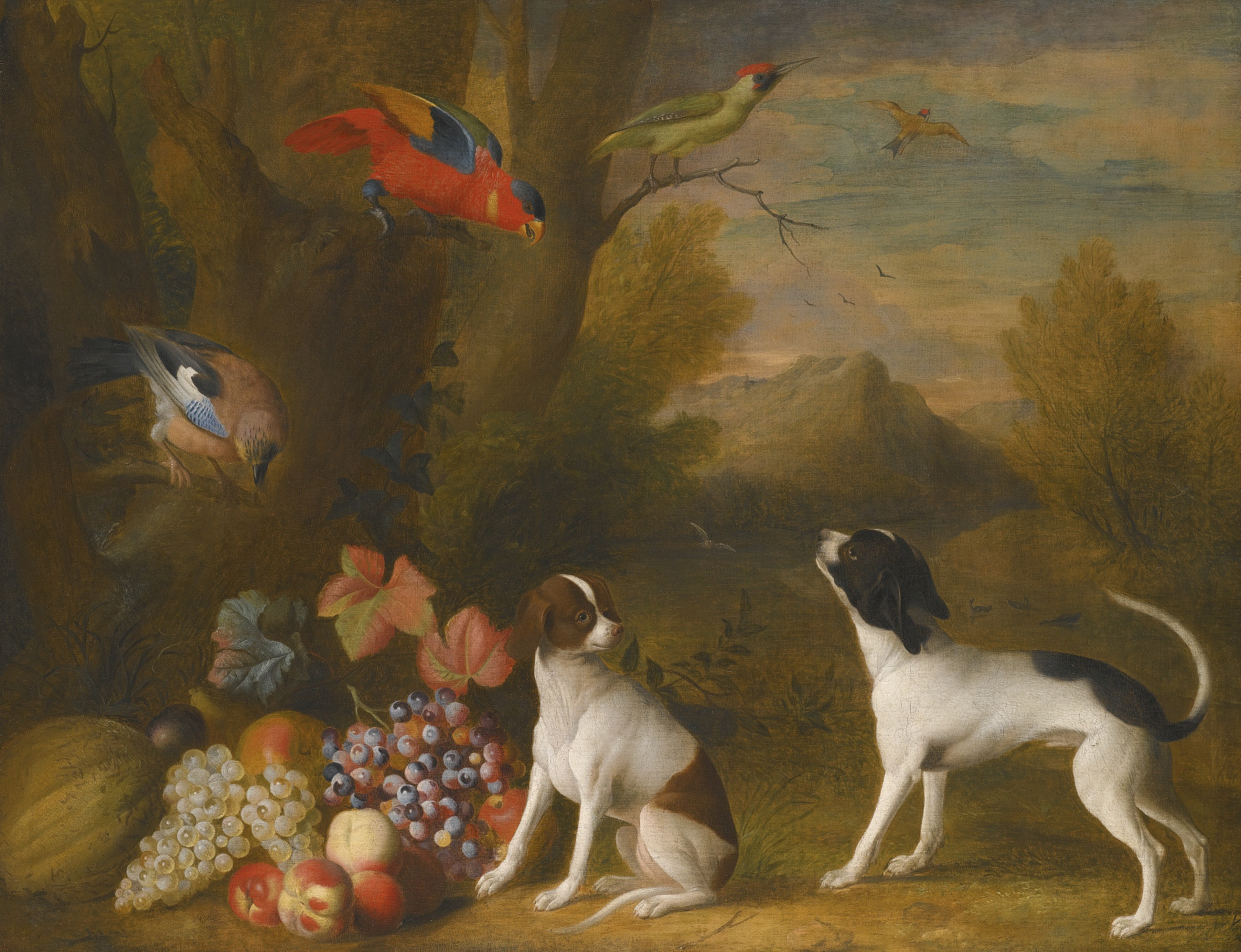
Landscape with Exotic Birds and two Dogs

His bird paintings featured an array of exotic species such as cockatoos, macaws, and mynas, which were likely to have been imported to European menageries at the time. He mixed them with familiar European birds such as great and blue tits, European green woodpeckers and Eurasian jays. He would often highlight a painting with a bird of red plumage, such as a scarlet ibis, red avadavat or northern cardinal. Numerous birds were usually crowded into his landscapes; an exception was the highly regarded Two Icelandic Falcons, painted around the end of the 17th century or early 18th. Currently housed in Nottingham Castle Museum and Art Gallery, it depicts two snowy white gyrfalcons.

One of his pictures was used as the cover of the 1974 Procol Harum album Exotic Birds and Fruit.

Several of his paintings are exhibited in the Hungarian National Gallery and the Museum of Fine Arts, Budapest. His painting Cat among roosters is in the Slovak National Gallery.
