= Jan van Oolen =

Dutch painter

Adriaen
- Jan van Alen
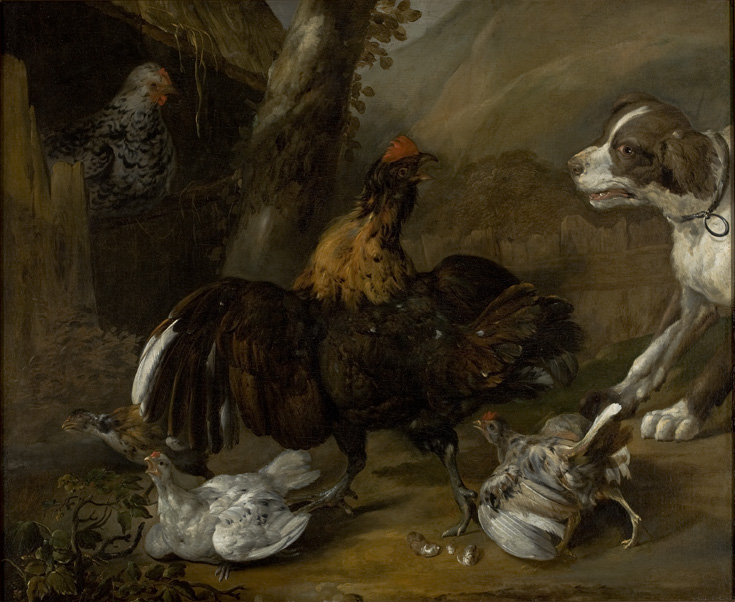
- Dog, Rooster, and Chickens in a Yard, now in the São Paulo Museum of Art
- Born: 1651
- Died: 1698 (aged 46–47)

Adriaen, or Jan van Alen (1651–1698) was a painter from the Dutch Republic.

He was born as the son of the animal painter Jacob van Oolen in Amsterdam, with whom his works are sometimes confused. He became an imitator of Melchior Hondekoeter, and his pictures, like those of that master, represent fowls, landscapes, and still-life.

== Works ==
Though inferior to Hondekoeter, he painted those objects with great fidelity. He also imitated other masters of the period with so much success that his copies have often passed for originals. He died in Amsterdam.
