= The Floating Feather =

Painting by Melchior d'Hondecoeter

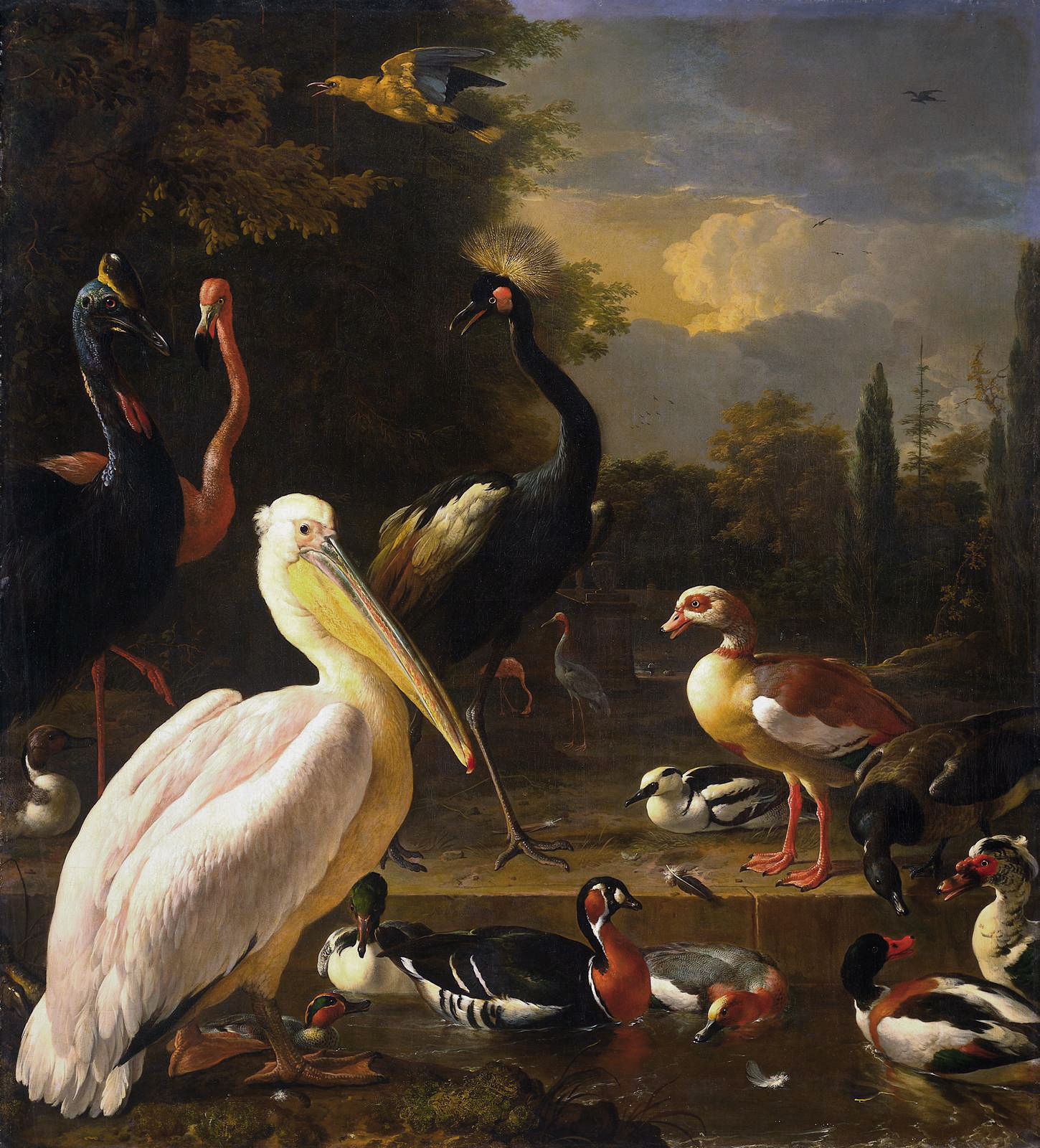
- Artist: Melchior d'Hondecoeter
- Year: c.1680
- Medium: Oil-on-canvas
- Dimensions: 159 cm × 144 cm (62 1/2 in × 56 1/2 in)
- Location: Rijksmuseum, Amsterdam

The Floating Feather is the commonly used name for an oil-on-canvas painting by Dutch artist Melchior d'Hondecoeter, properly titled A Pelican and Other Birds Near a Pool. The fine detail of the feather floating on the pond led to the "official" title being quickly supplanted.

The picture was painted around 1680, probably for either the hunting lodge of the Stadholder William III of Orange, which is now Soestdijk Palace, or Het Loo Palace in Apeldoorn.

The painting shows a number of birds, both common and exotic, gathered around a pool. Hondecoeter was known for his bird studies and in particular for the realistic portrayal of the subjects. Although he experimented with different styles early in his career, after 1660 he favoured compositions similar to that seen in The Floating Feather: carefully observed subjects set in farmyards, courtyards or country parks with architectural or landscape features enhancing the backgrounds. His paintings were admired by the regents and merchants of Amsterdam, and by William III, who had works at three of his palaces. Hondecoeter's murals and large paintings were well-suited to both the large country houses and the tastes of the time.

Hondecoeter kept his own poultry yard at his house, but visited the country houses of his patrons where he could study more exotic species. It was said that he had trained a rooster to stand still on command, so that he could paint it without interruption. In this picture, alongside the great white pelican are species of wild fowl and domesticated duck, among them a Eurasian teal, common merganser, red-breasted goose, Eurasian wigeon, common shelduck, muscovy duck, brant goose, smew, Egyptian goose, and northern pintail. On the far side of the pool are also large birds from different continents: a southern cassowary, black crowned crane, and American flamingo. A sarus crane and a second flamingo are visible in the background. Flying above the pool there is a golden oriole depicted.

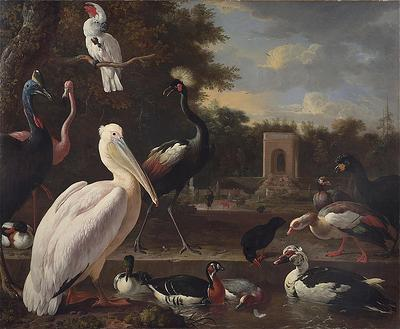
A Pelican and Other Exotic Birds in a Park

Hondecoeter produced a strikingly similar picture, A Pelican and other exotic birds in a park, in which some elements of the composition are identical: the birds on the water, the group of exotic birds, the pelican, and the floating feather. Other features are similar, such as the landscape and the muscovy duck which is seen in full, while some are entirely different; in this picture a Moluccan cockatoo perches in a tree above the pool and different birds are introduced on the far side of the pool to the right. The exact date of this painting is not known, but it is estimated to be between 1655 and 1660.
