= Gijsbert d'Hondecoeter =

Dutch landscape and animalier painter

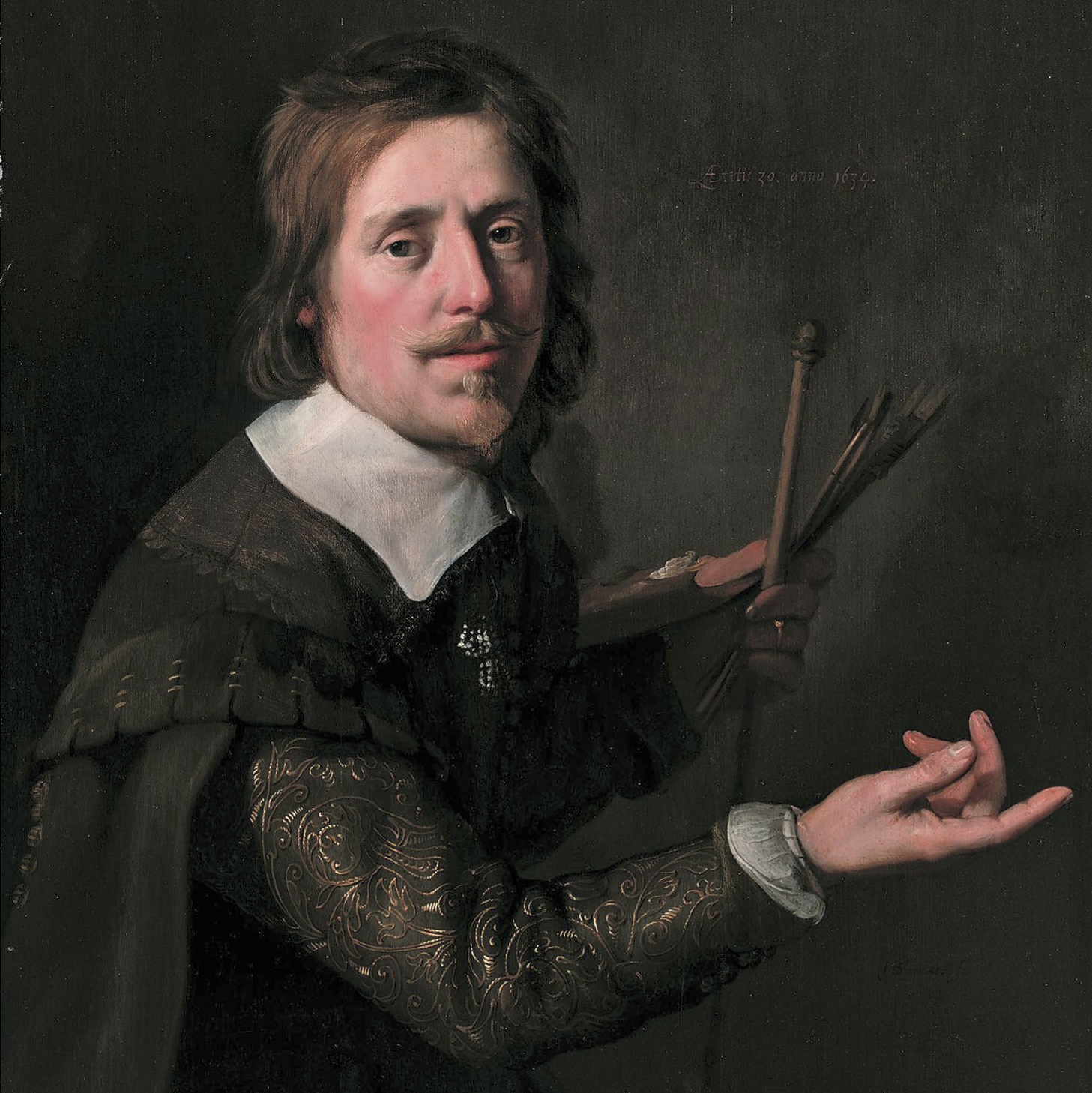
Gijsbert Gillisz de Hondecoutre (1634) by Hendrick Bloemaert

Gijsbert d'Hondecoeter (1604 – 29 August 1653) was a Dutch landscape and animalier painter.

Hondecoeter belonged to a family of painters. His father was Gillis d'Hondecoeter and his son was Melchior d'Hondecoeter. Hondecoeter primarily painted works of barnyard fowl. Some of his works can be found at the Rijksmuseum Amsterdam. He became a member of the Guild of St. Luke in Utrecht in 1629. After he died in 1653, his brother-in-law and artist Jan Baptist Weenix continued the training of his son Melchior.

== Gallery ==
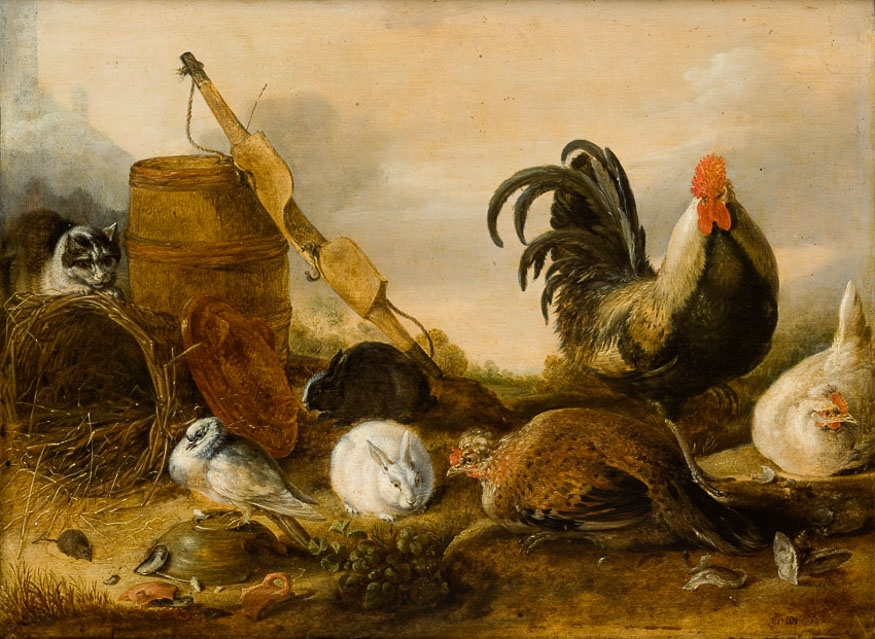
Animals in the Yard (1632), oil on panel, 47.5 x 64 cm., National Museum, Kraków

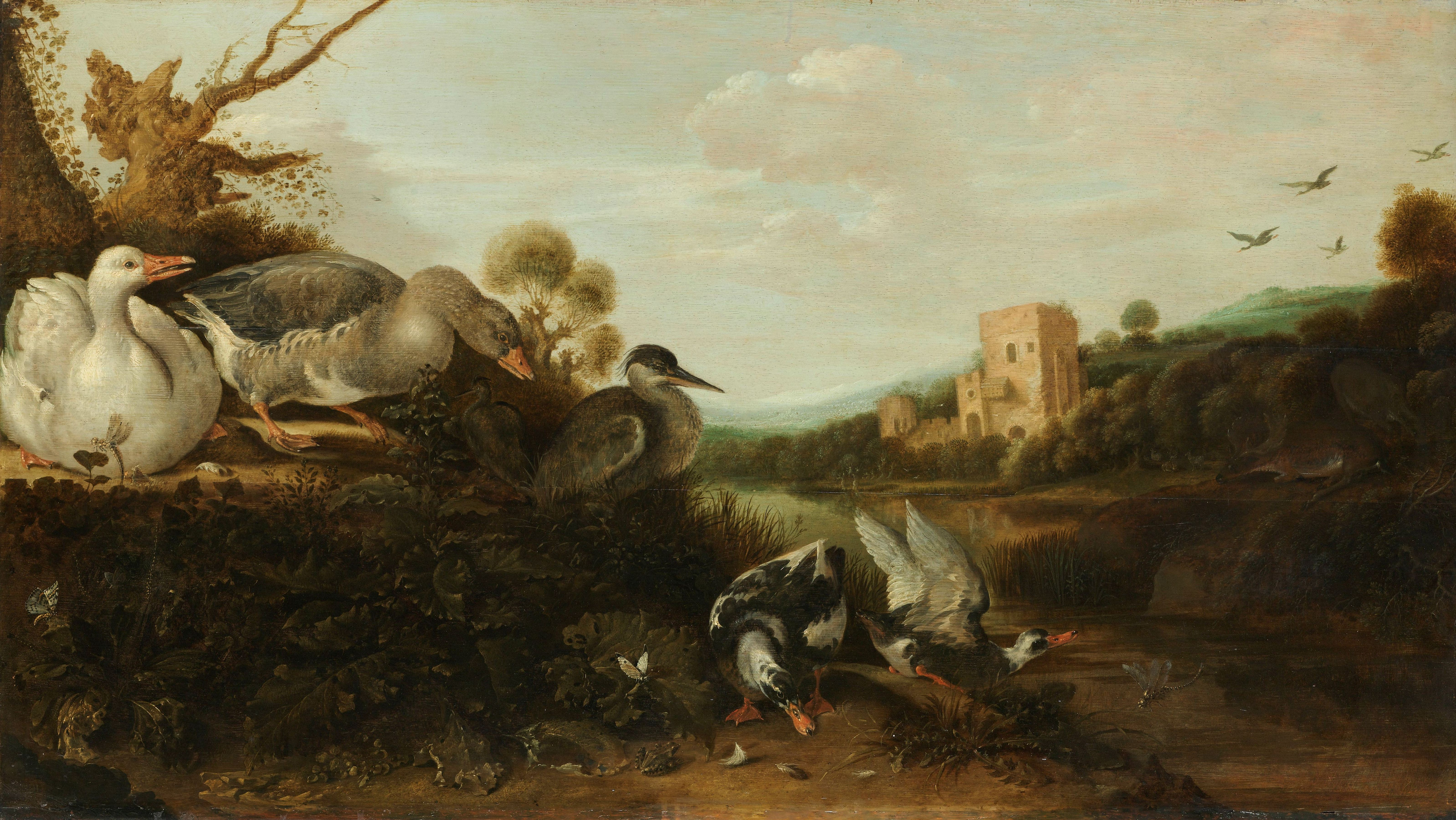
Waterfowl (1652), oil on panel, 57.6 x 102.2cm., Rijksmuseum

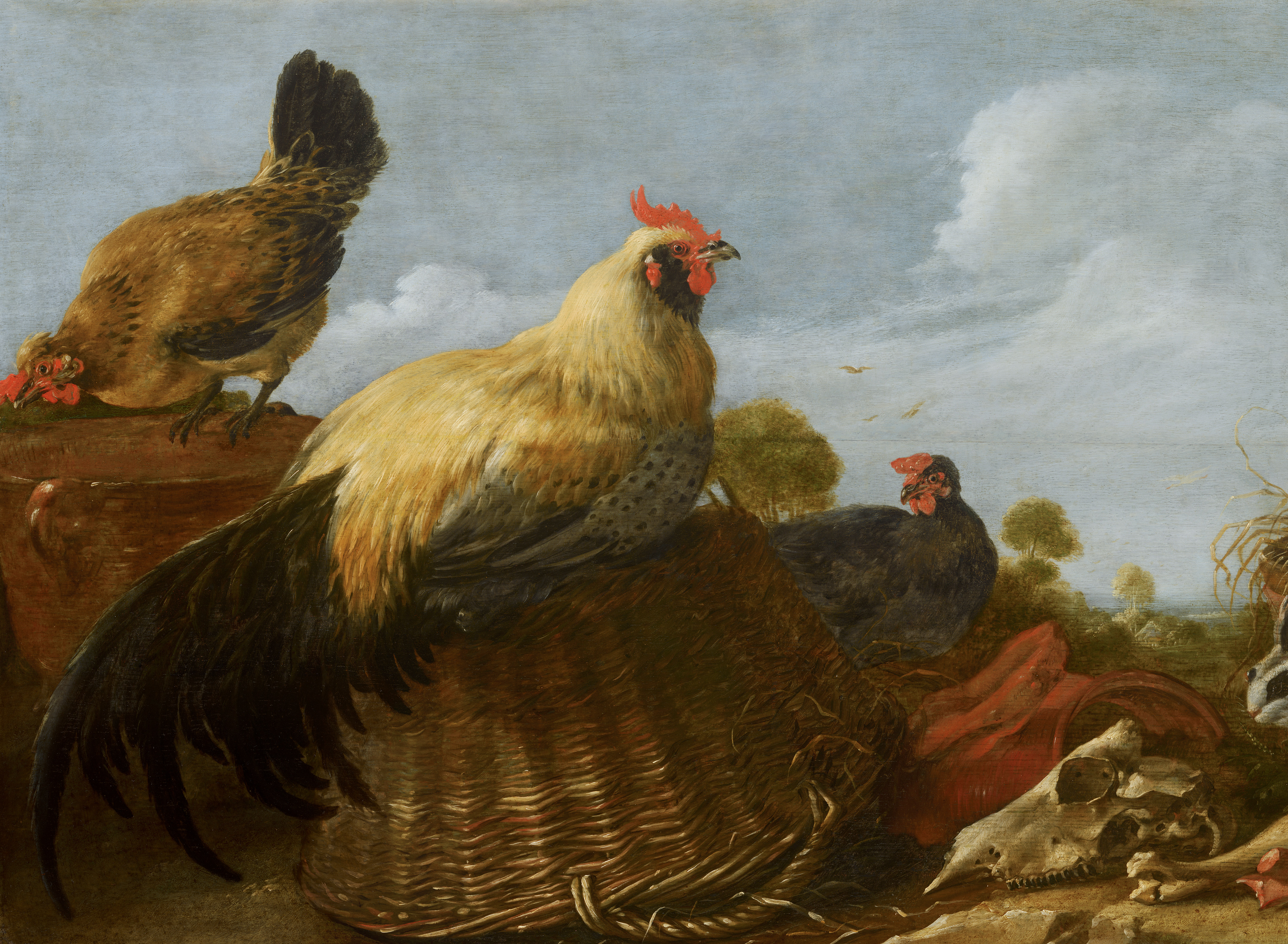
Cock and Hens in a Landscape (ca. 1619–53), 52 x 70 cm., Mauritshuis

== See also ==
- Gillis d'Hondecoeter
- Melchior d'Hondecoeter
- Jan Baptist Weenix
- Dutch Golden Age painting
- Dutch Golden Age
- Animalier
- Guild of Saint Luke
- Rijksmuseum
