= Jan Baptist Weenix =

17th-century Dutch painter

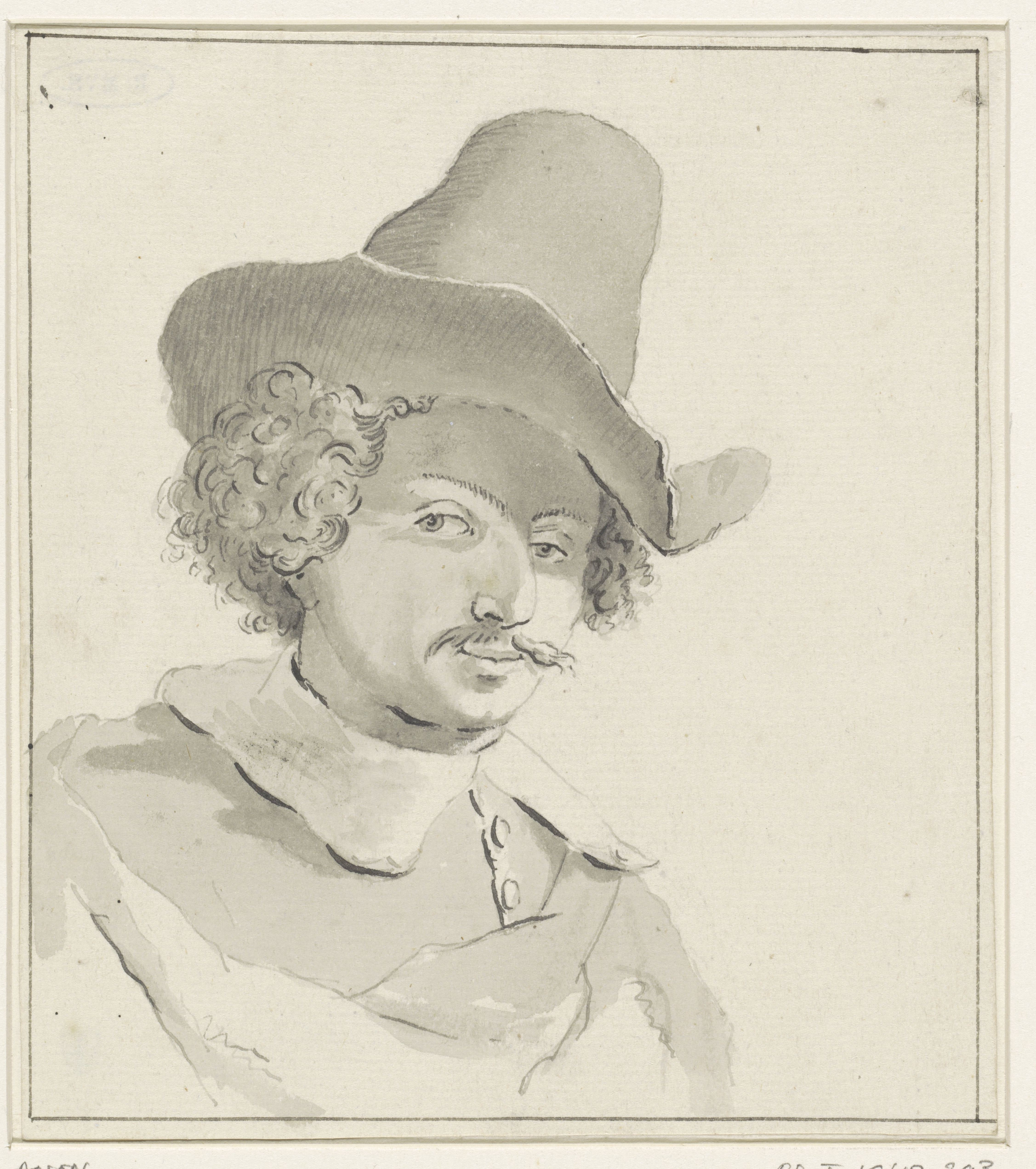
- Portrait of the artist
- Born: 1621; Amsterdam, Dutch Republic
- Died: 1659 (aged 37–38); Vleuten, Dutch Republic
- Known for: Painting
- Movement: Dutch Golden Age
- Children: Jan Weenix

Jan Baptist Weenix, also spelled Jan Baptiste Weeninx (1621–1659), was a painter of the Dutch Golden Age. Despite his relatively brief career, he was a very productive and versatile painter. His favourite subjects were Italian landscapes with large figures among ruins, seaside views, and, later in life, large still life pictures of dead game or dogs. He was mainly responsible for introducing the Italian harbor scene into Dutch art, in mid-size paintings with a group of figures in the foreground.

== Life ==
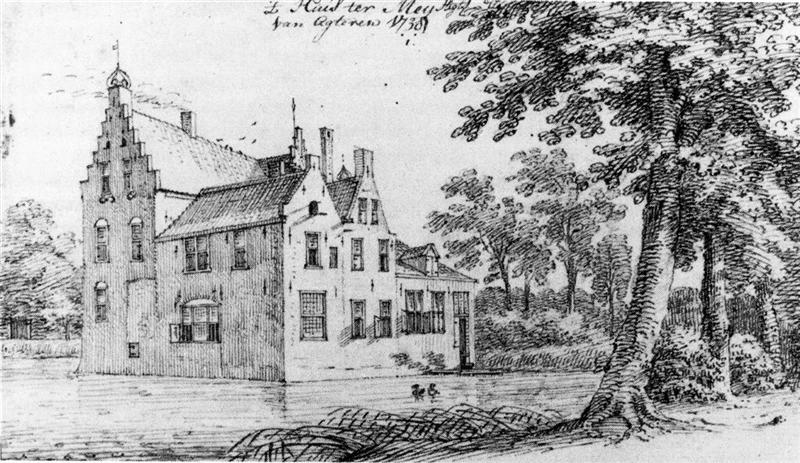
Castle Ter Mey, Vleuten, 1738 drawing by Hendrik Spilman

Weenix was born near Amsterdam's harbor, the son of an architect. He could not speak well, apparently from a medical condition, and because he very much liked to read books, his mother sent him to work for a bookseller, who was not able to deal with him. He drew whenever he could, according to Jan Weenix his son, who told the story to Arnold Houbraken.

Weenix first studied under Jan Micker, who was the brother-in-law of his oldest sister Lysbeth. He then studied in Utrecht under Abraham Bloemaert, and later back in Amsterdam under Claes Corneliszoon Moeyaert. In 1639, he married Josijntje d'Hondecoeter, the daughter of Gillis d'Hondecoeter. In 1643, Weenix travelled to Rome with Nicolaes Pieterszoon Berchem, who had also studied with Moeyaert. He had left his home in secret, but his wife traced him to Rotterdam. He was allowed to stay away for four months. In Rome, he became a member of the Bentvueghels with the name Ratel (meaning rattle, because a voice defect), and was much esteemed and worked for Pope Innocent X. He returned to Amsterdam after four years; his wife had refused to come to Rome.

In 1649, he became master of the guild of St. Luke in Utrecht, and also painted a portrait of René Descartes. When his brother-in-law Gijsbert d'Hondecoeter died, he trained his nephew Melchior d'Hondecoeter, together with his own son Jan Weenix. Weenix rented the castle Ter Mey at Haarzuilens outside Utrecht, to concentrate on his work or for health reasons (plague). On 25 April 1659 the inventory of his estate was auctioned off. His widow, who had been living on Wittevrouwenstraat, in Utrecht, was buried on 6 October 1662.

He painted a few religious scenes, one of the rare pieces of this kind being the "Jacob and Esau" (Gemäldegalerie Alte Meister, Dresden). In the National Gallery, London, is a "Hunting Scene" by Weenix, and Glasgow has a characteristic painting of ruins. Weenix is represented at most of the important continental galleries, notably at Munich, Vienna, Berlin, Amsterdam, and St Petersburg.

== Public collections ==
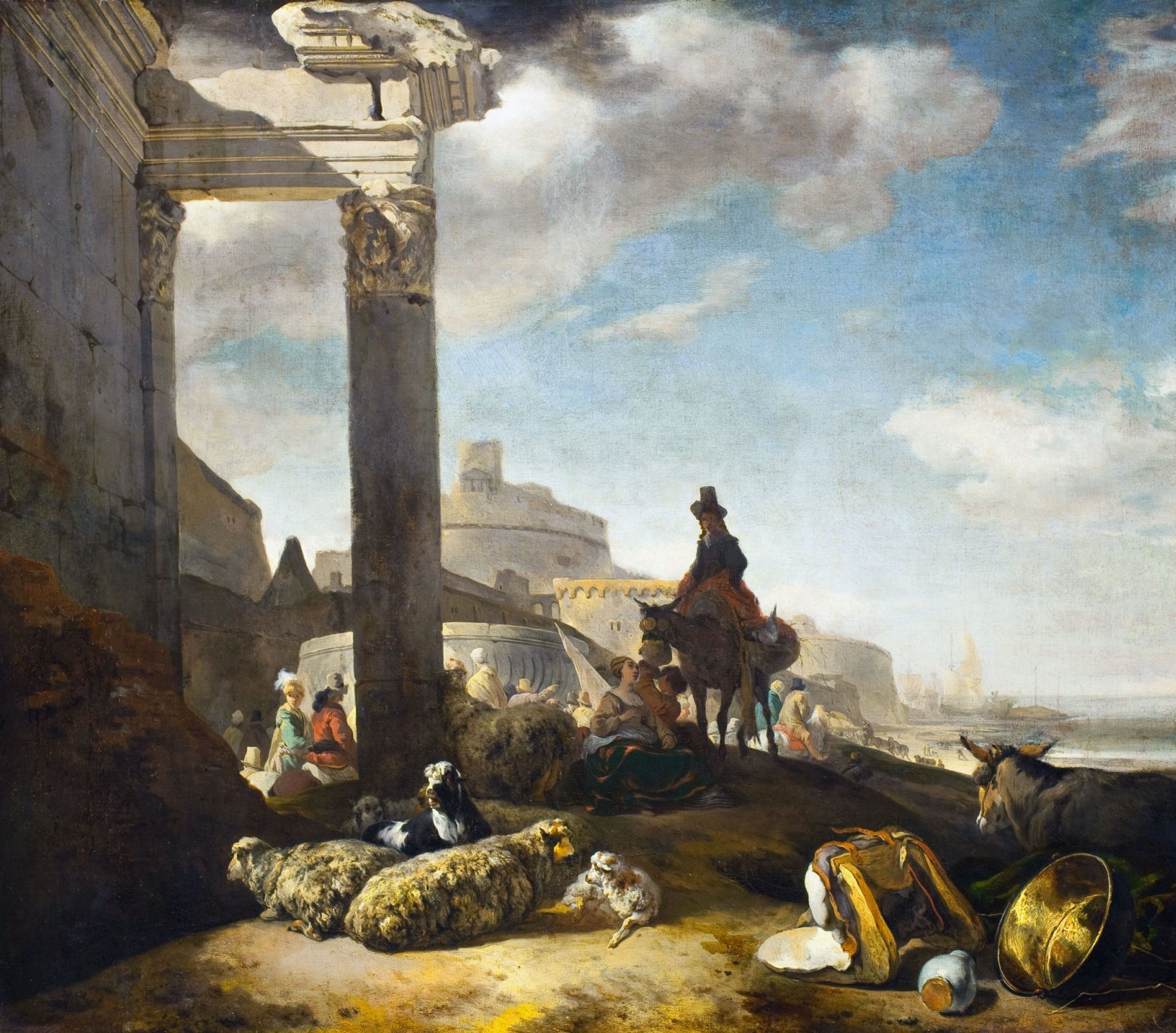
Before the walls of Rome from the National Museum in Wrocław

Among the public collections holding works by Jan Baptist Weenix are:

- Museum de Fundatie in Zwolle, Netherlands
- Teylers Museum, in Haarlem, Netherlands
- Museum Boijmans Van Beuningen in Rotterdam, Netherlands
- Philadelphia Museum of Art in Philadelphia, Pennsylvania, United States
- Wallace Collection, London, England

== Literature ==
Attribution:

- Anke A. Van Wagenberg-Ter Hoeven (2018) Jan Baptist Weenix & Jan Weenix: The Paintings, Zwolle: Waanders & De Kunst. ISBN 9789462621596
