= Melchior d'Hondecoeter =

Dutch painter (1636–1695)

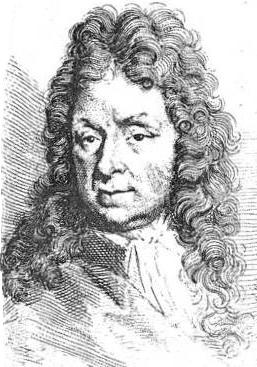
Portrait of Melchior d'Hondecoeter for Arnold Houbraken's Schouwburg, by Houbraken's son Jacob.

Melchior d'Hondecoeter (Dutch pronunciation: [ˈmɛlxijɔr də ˈɦɔndəˌkutər]; c. 1636 – 3 April 1695), Dutch animalier painter, was born in Utrecht and died in Amsterdam. After the start of his career, he painted virtually exclusively bird subjects, usually exotic or game, in park-like landscapes. Hondecoeter's paintings featured geese (brent goose, Egyptian goose and red-breasted goose), fieldfares, partridges, pigeons, ducks, northern cardinal, magpies and peacocks, but also African grey crowned cranes, Asian sarus cranes, Indonesian yellow-crested cockatoos, an Indonesian purple-naped lory and grey-headed lovebirds from Madagascar.

== Biography ==
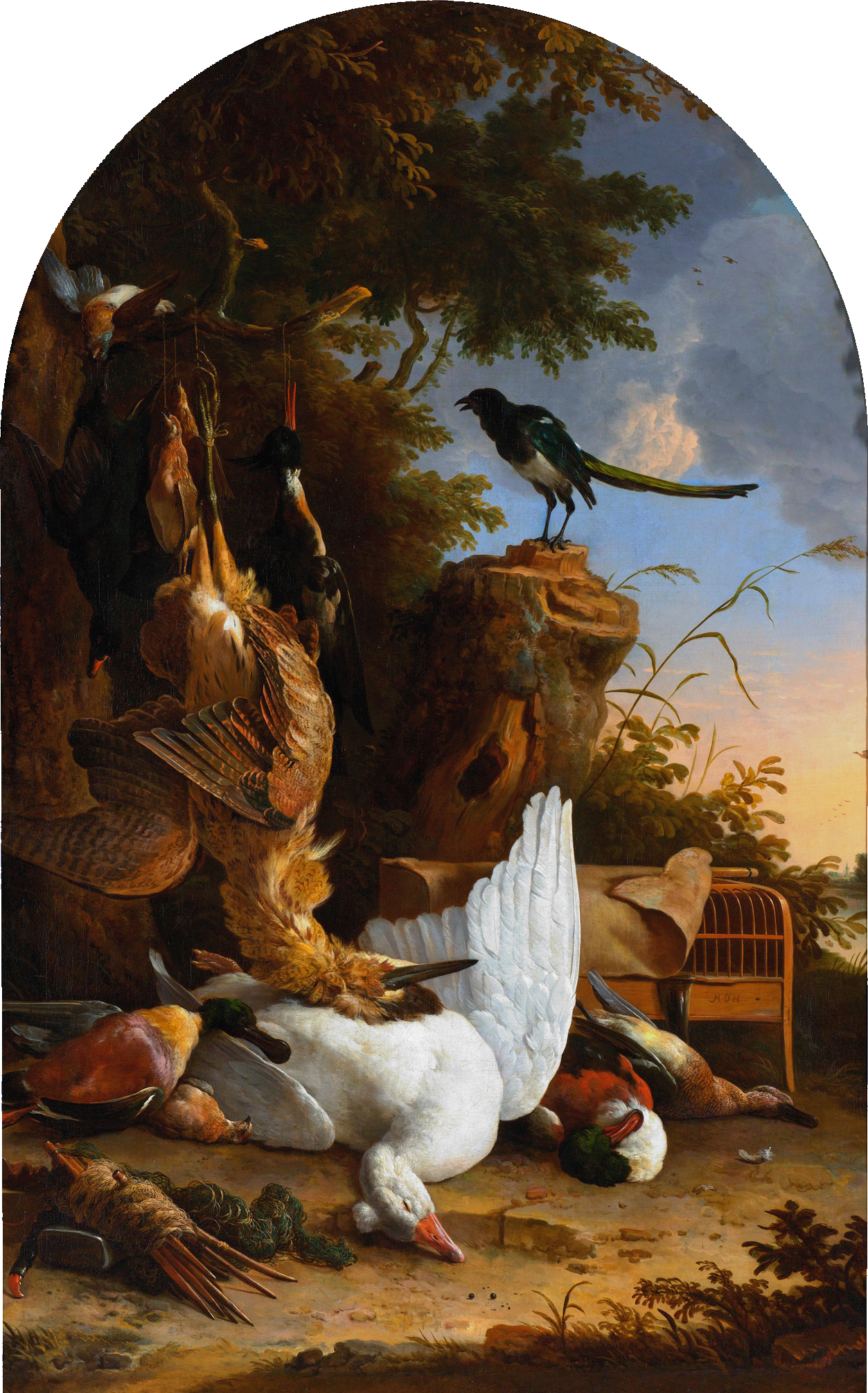
Hunting trophies beside a magpie on a tree stump, Rijksmuseum, Amsterdam

Being the grandson of the painter Gillis d'Hondecoeter and the son of Gijsbert d'Hondecoeter, whose sister Josina married Jan Baptist Weenix, he was brought up in an artistic milieu. Melchior's cousin Jan Weenix told Arnold Houbraken that in his youth Melchior was extremely religious, praying very loud, so that his mother and uncle doubted whether they would have him trained as a painter or a minister.

In 1659, he was working in The Hague and became a member of Confrerie Pictura, the painters' academy of that town. In 1663, Hondecoeter married Susanne Tradel from Amsterdam. She lived on the Lauriergracht, and was thirty when they married. The couple had two children, baptized in 1666 and 1668. She is said to have been captious, and had her sisters living in the house. According to Houbraken, Hondecoeter spent much time in his garden or drinking in the tavern in the Jordaan. On the Lauriergracht he was surrounded by art dealers and various painters. Later he moved to a house on the Leliegracht (near the present Anne Frank House). In 1692, his wife died. Hondecoeter lived in the house of his daughter Isabel in the Warmoesstraat, but was buried in the Westerkerk. He left his daughter with substantial debts. His inventory lists a small gallows, to keep birds in the right position, and seven paintings of Frans Snyders.

Hondecoeter began his career with a different speciality from that by which he is usually known. Mr de Stuers affirms that he produced sea-pieces. One of his earliest works is Tub with Fish, dated 1655, in the Herzog Anton Ulrich Museum. Hondecoeter soon abandoned fish for fowl. He acquired celebrity as a painter of birds only, which he represented not exclusively, like Johannes Fyt, as the gamekeeper's perquisite after a day's shooting, or stock of a poulterer's shop, but as living beings with passions, joys, fears and quarrels, to which naturalists will tell us that birds are subject. Without the brilliant tone and high finish of Fyt, the latter's Dutch rival's birds are full of action; and, as Burger says, "Hondecoeter displays the maternity of the hen with as much tenderness and feeling as Raphael the maternity of Madonnas." But Fyt, a pupil of Snyder, was at home in depicting the coat of deer and dons as well as plumage. Hondecoeter cultivated a narrower field, and seldom went beyond a cock-fight or a display of mere bird life.

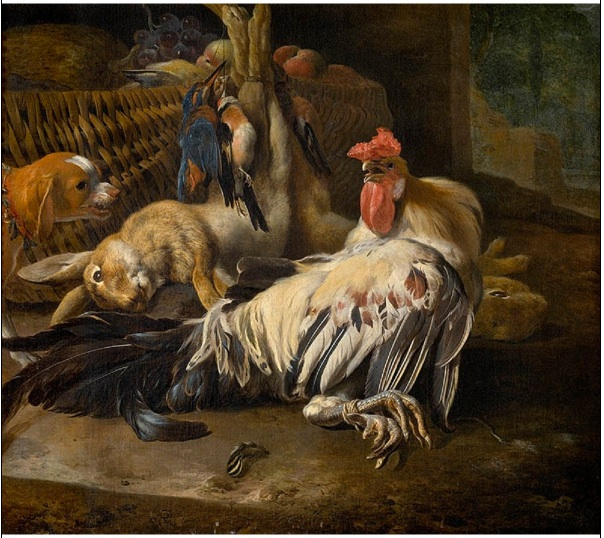
Still Life with Cock, Royal Museum of Fine Arts Antwerp

Very few of his pictures are dated, around twenty of them, though more are signed. Notable are Jackdaw deprived of his Borrowed Plumes (1671), at the Mauritshuis in The Hague, of which Earl Cadogan has an authentic copy; Game and Poultry and A Spaniel hunting a Partridge (1672), in the Royal Museums of Fine Arts of Belgium; A Park with Poultry (1686) at the Hermitage of St Petersburg.

Hondecoeter also painted wall hangings with views of buildings and parks. Stadtholder William III employed Hondecoeter, in great favour with the magnates of the Dutch Republic, to paint his menagerie at Het Loo. The picture, now at The Hague museum, shows India's cattle, elephants and gazelles. But he is better in homelier works, with which he adorned the royal castles of Bensberg and Oranienstein at different periods of his life. His earliest works are more conscientious, lighter and more transparent than his later ones.

According to the RKD his registered pupils were Willem Hendrik Wilhelmus van Royen and Jan Weenix. He was followed by or influenced D. Birrius, Peter Casteels (III), Adriaen van Oolen, Felice Boselli, Angelo Maria Crivelli, Tobias Stranover, Charles Collins (c. 1680-1744), Marmaduke Cradock, Adriaen Coorte, Jan van Huysum, and Elias Vonck.

== Collections ==
His masterpieces are at The Hague, Soestdijk and at Amsterdam (The Floating Feather), but there are fine examples in the Wallace Collection and Belton House in England, and in the public galleries of Berlin, Budapest, Caen, Cologne, Copenhagen, Detroit, Dresden, Dublin, Florence, Glasgow, Hanover, Karlsruhe, Kassel, London, Lyon, Lille, Melbourne, Montpellier, Munich, Paris, Poltava, Riga, Rotterdam, Rouen, Stuttgart, Schwerin, Vaduz, Warsaw and Vienna. The largest Hondecoeter exhibition to date was held in Berlin in 2010, where 18 of his works were shown at the Neue Nationalgalerie as part of Willem de Rooij's installation 'Intolerance'.

== In popular culture ==
His painting 'A Pelican and other Birds near a Pool’, otherwise known as ‘The Floating Feather’ (c. 1680), was used by William Doyle (musician) for the cover of his album Great Spans of Muddy Time.

== Gallery ==
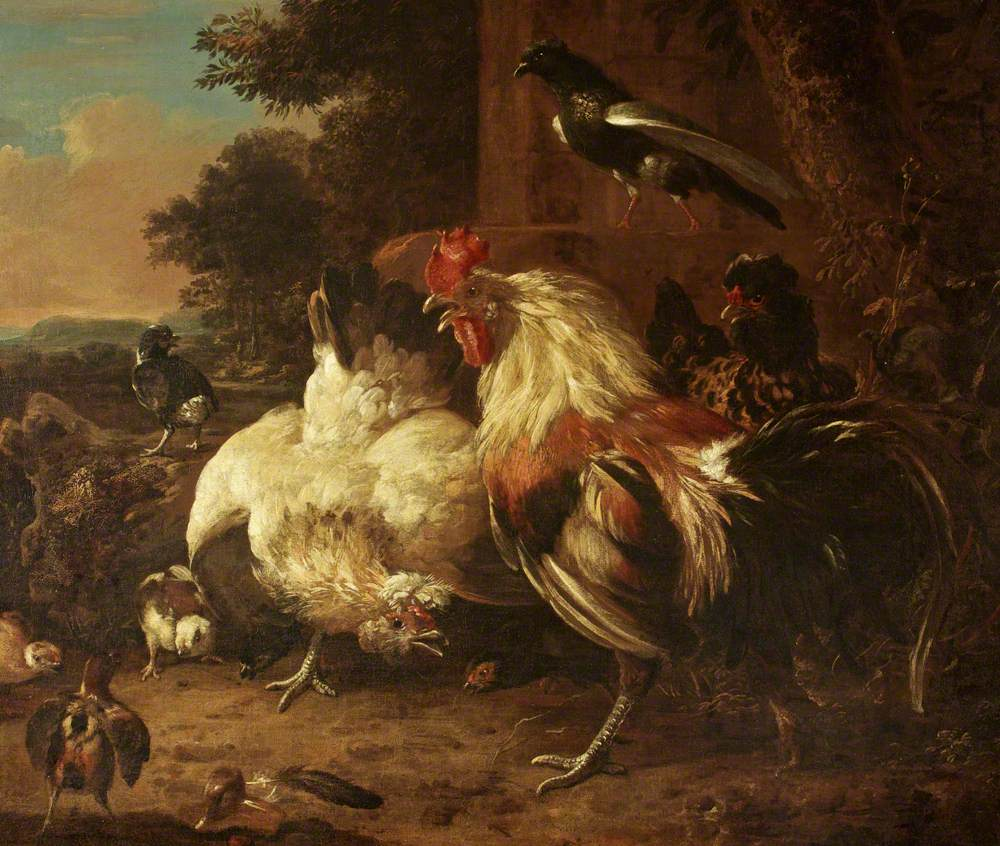
A Cock and Two Hens, with Chicks, in a Landscape Setting (1656–95), oil on canvas, 76.8 x cm., National Trust

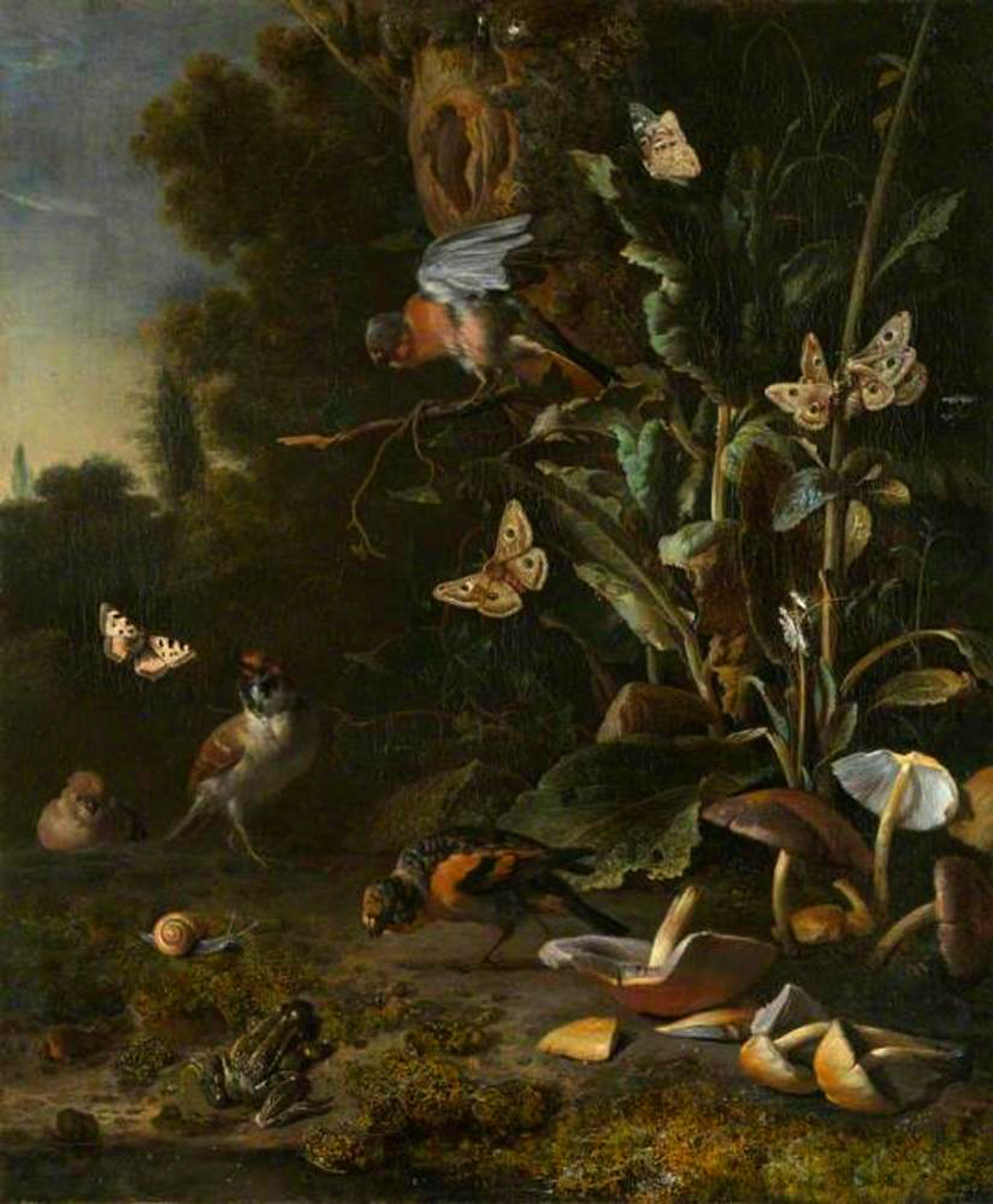
Birds, Butterflies and Frog with Plants and Fungi (1668), oil on canvas, 68.3 x 56.8 cm., National Gallery

Peace in the henhouse (1668), oil on canvas, 88.7 x 111.2 cm., Staatliche Kuntshalle Karlsruhe

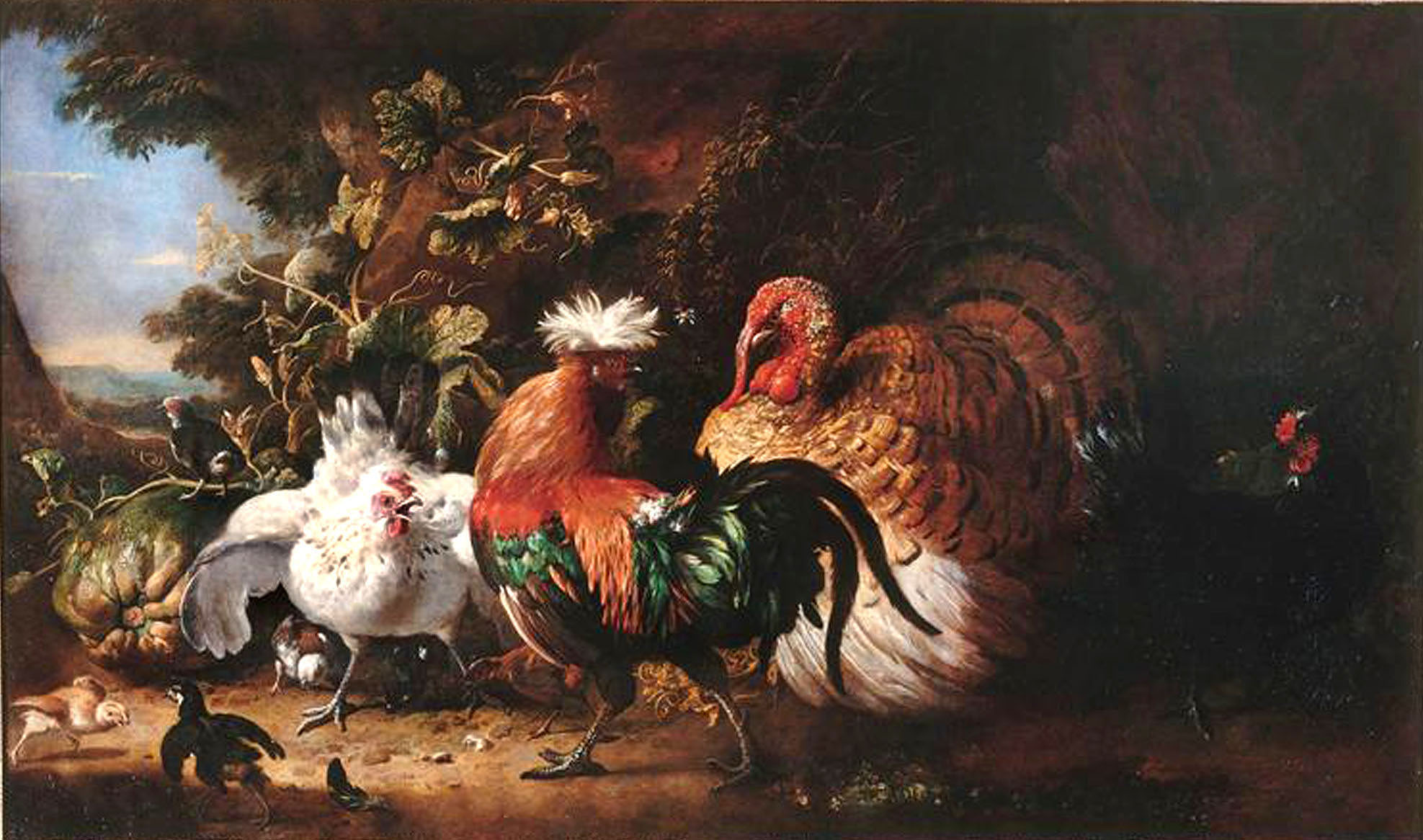
Backyard Birds (1660s), oil on canvas, 105 x 182 cm., Musée Condé

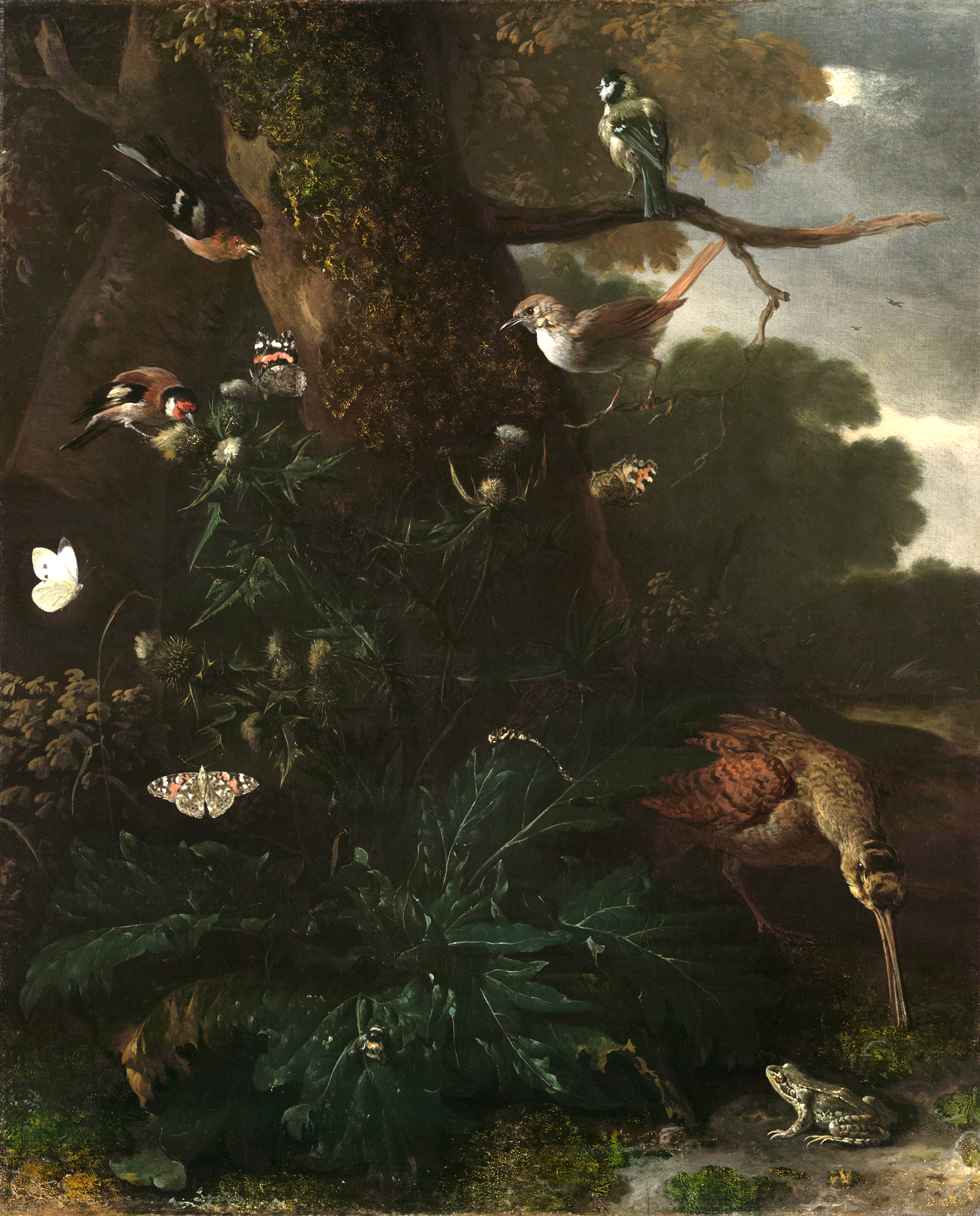
Animals and Plants of the Forest (ca. 1670-80), oil on canvas, 81.2 x 64.7 cm., Yale University Art Gallery

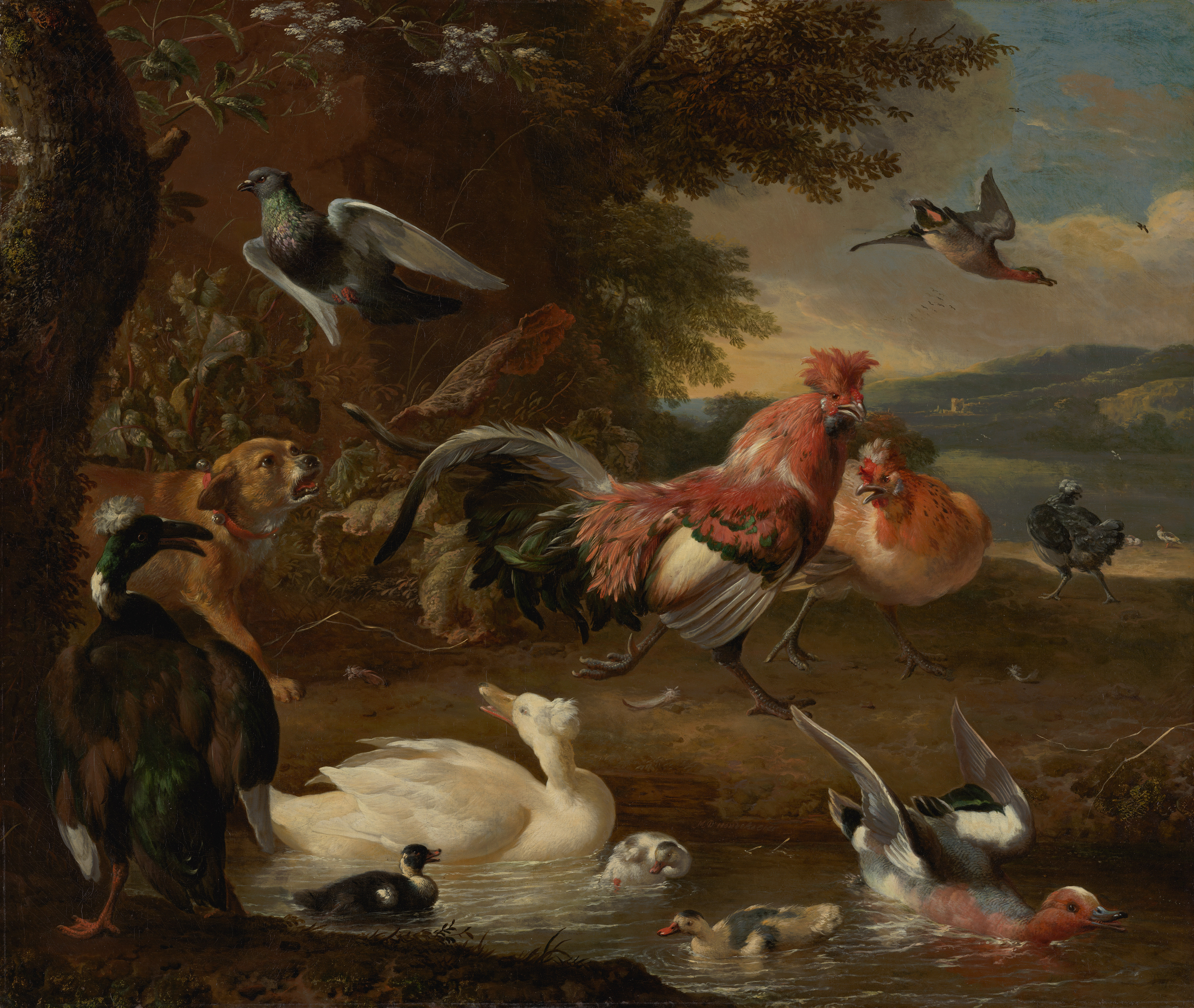
Chickens and Ducks (ca. 1660-90), oil on canvas, 115 x 136 cm., Mauritshuis

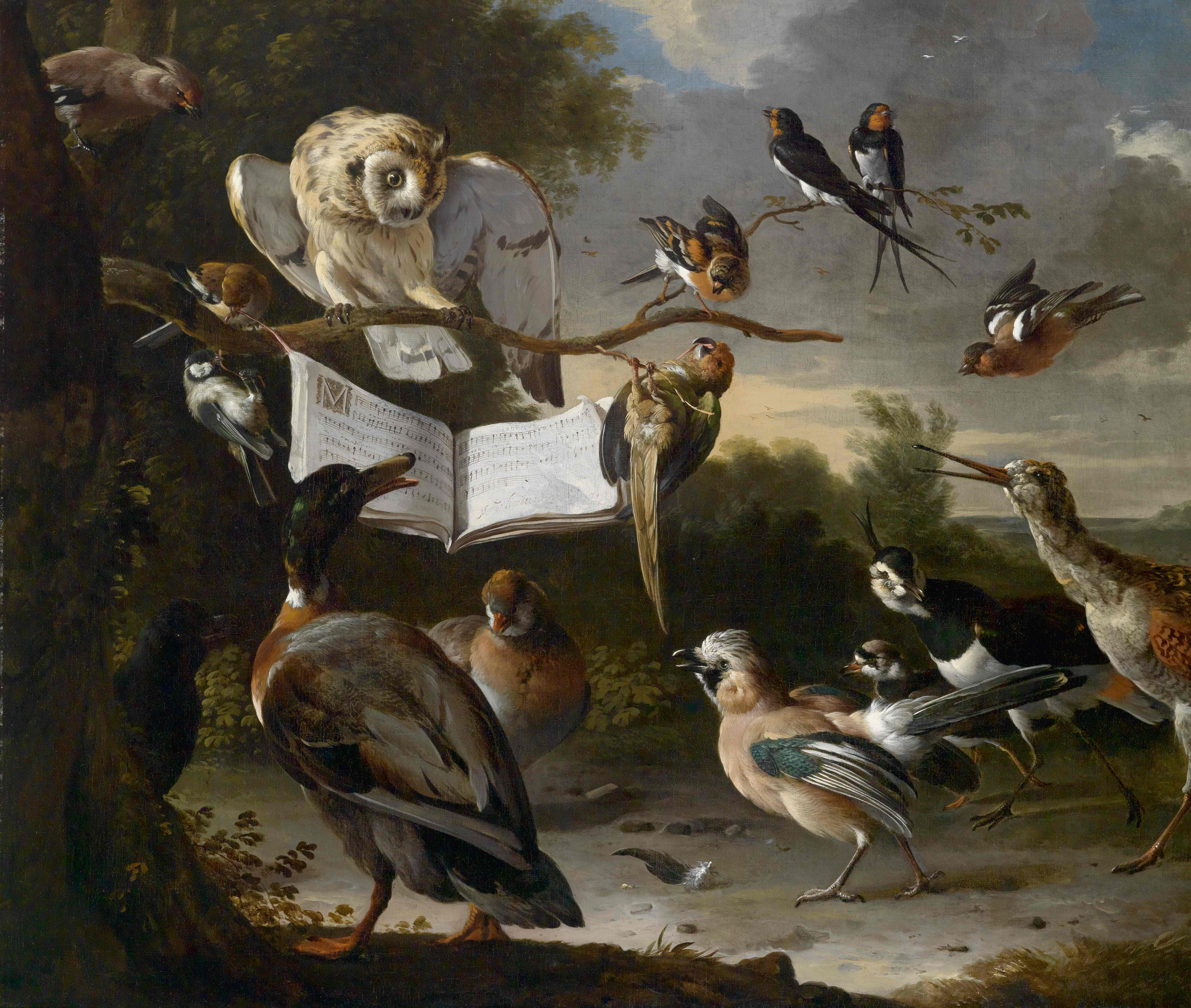
Concert of Birds (1670), oil on canvas, 84 x 99 cm., private collection

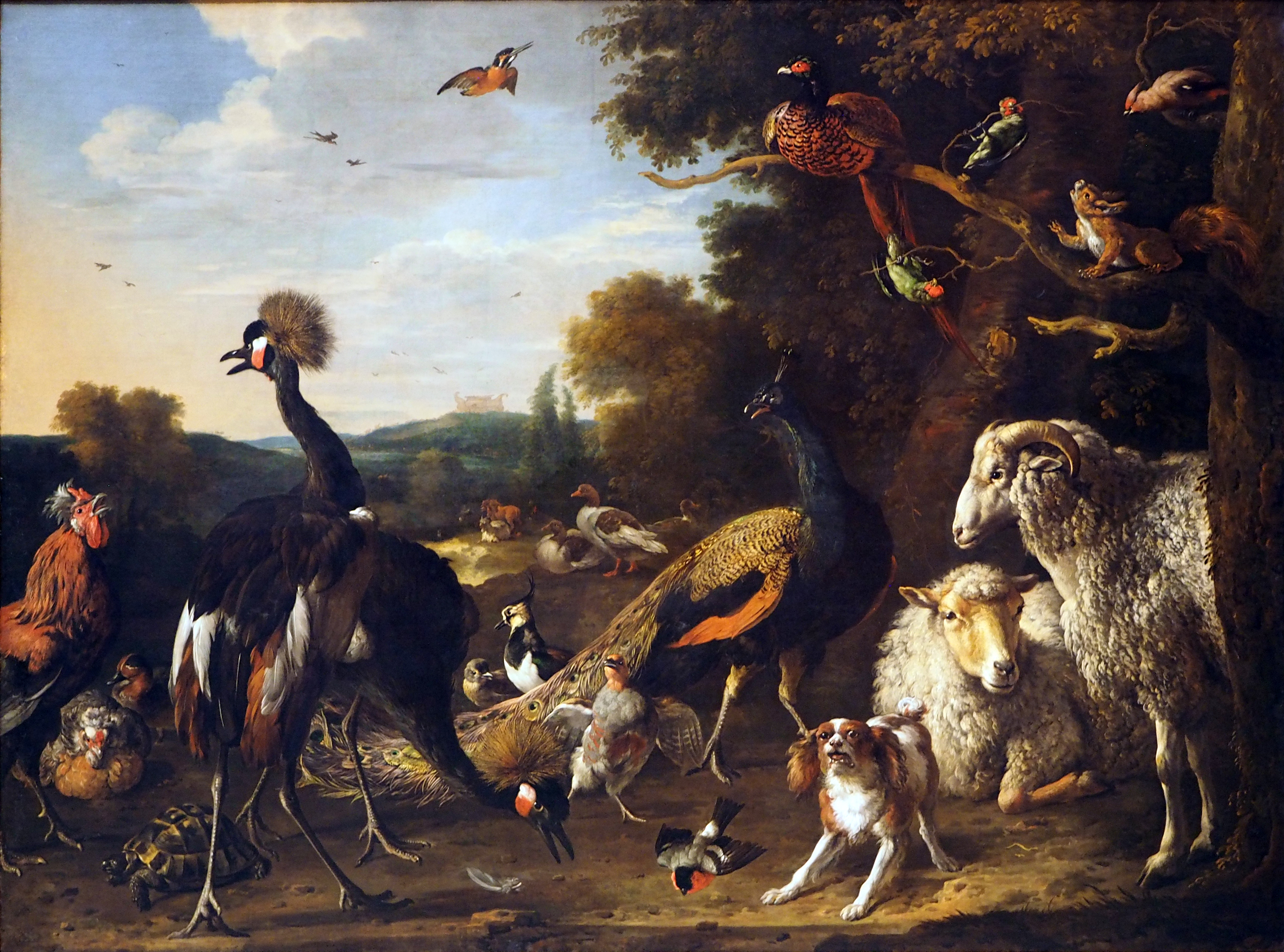
Beast in Front of Noah's Ark (ca. 1680), oil on canvas, Herzog Anton Ulrich Museum

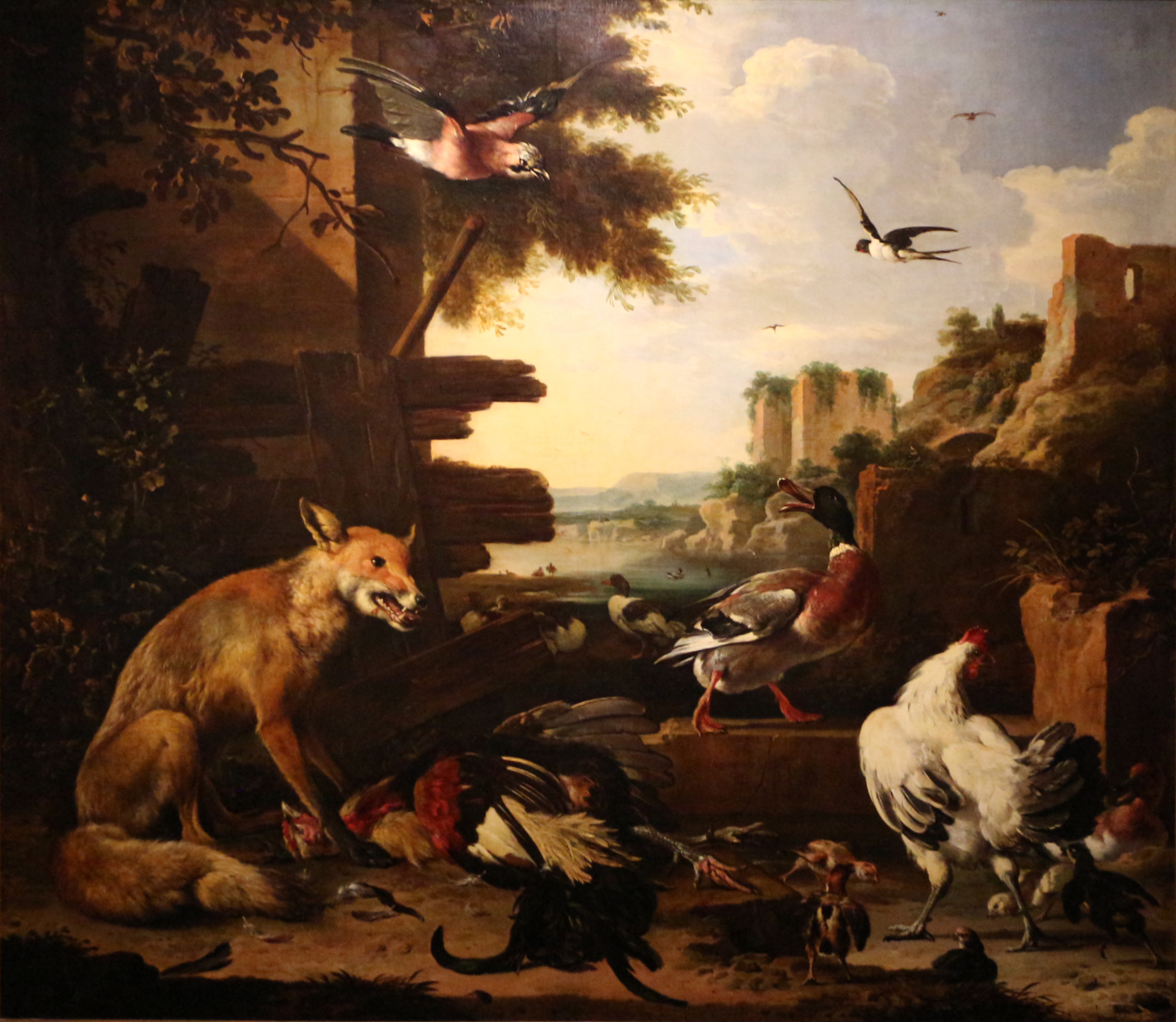
Fox with Dead Rooster and Poultry (1678), oil on canvas, 148 x 170 cm., Heritage Agency of the Netherlands Art Collection

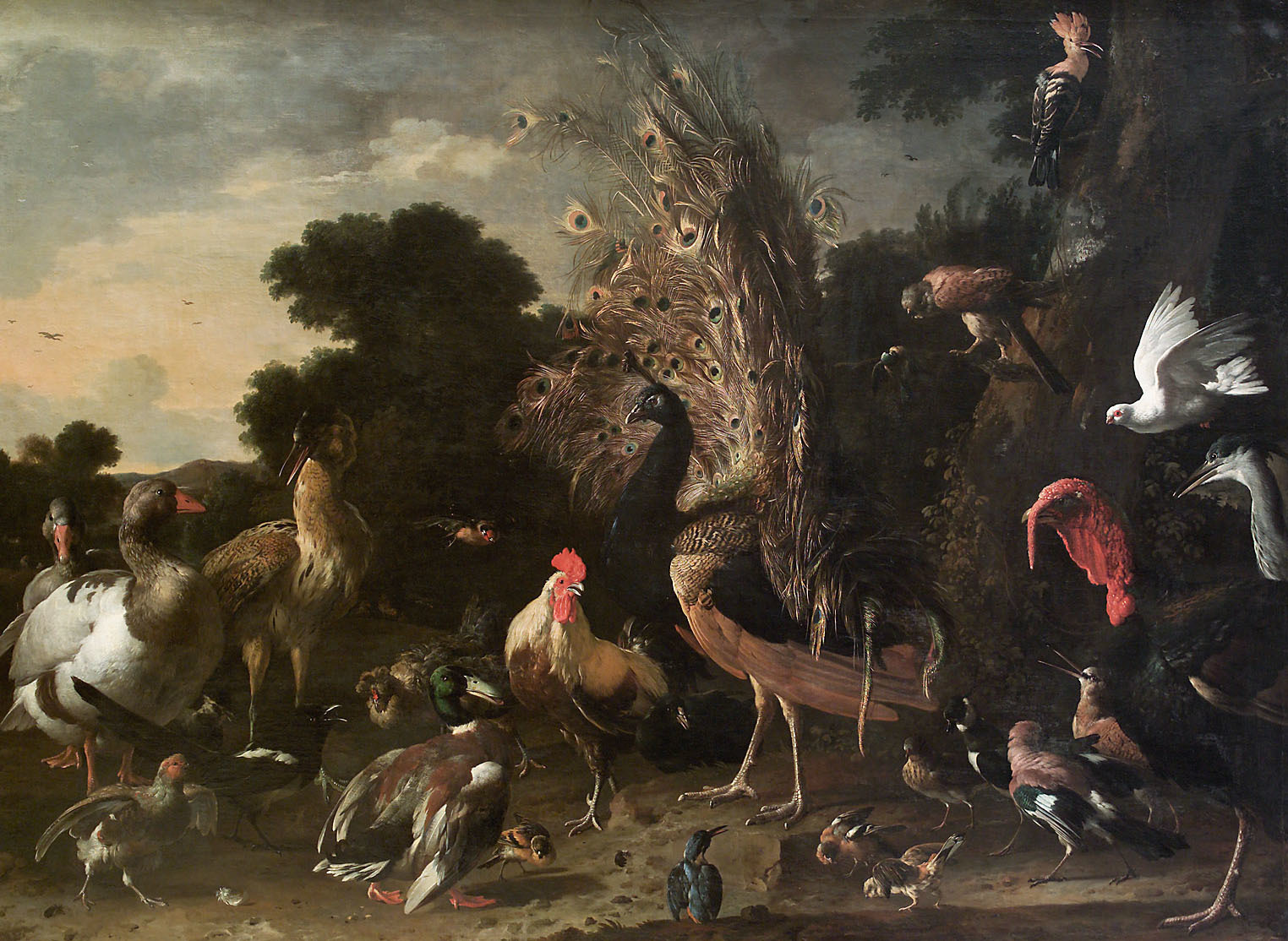
Geflügelhof [Poultry Farm] (ca. 1675-99), oil on canvas, 162 × 220,5 cm., Kunsthistorisches Museum

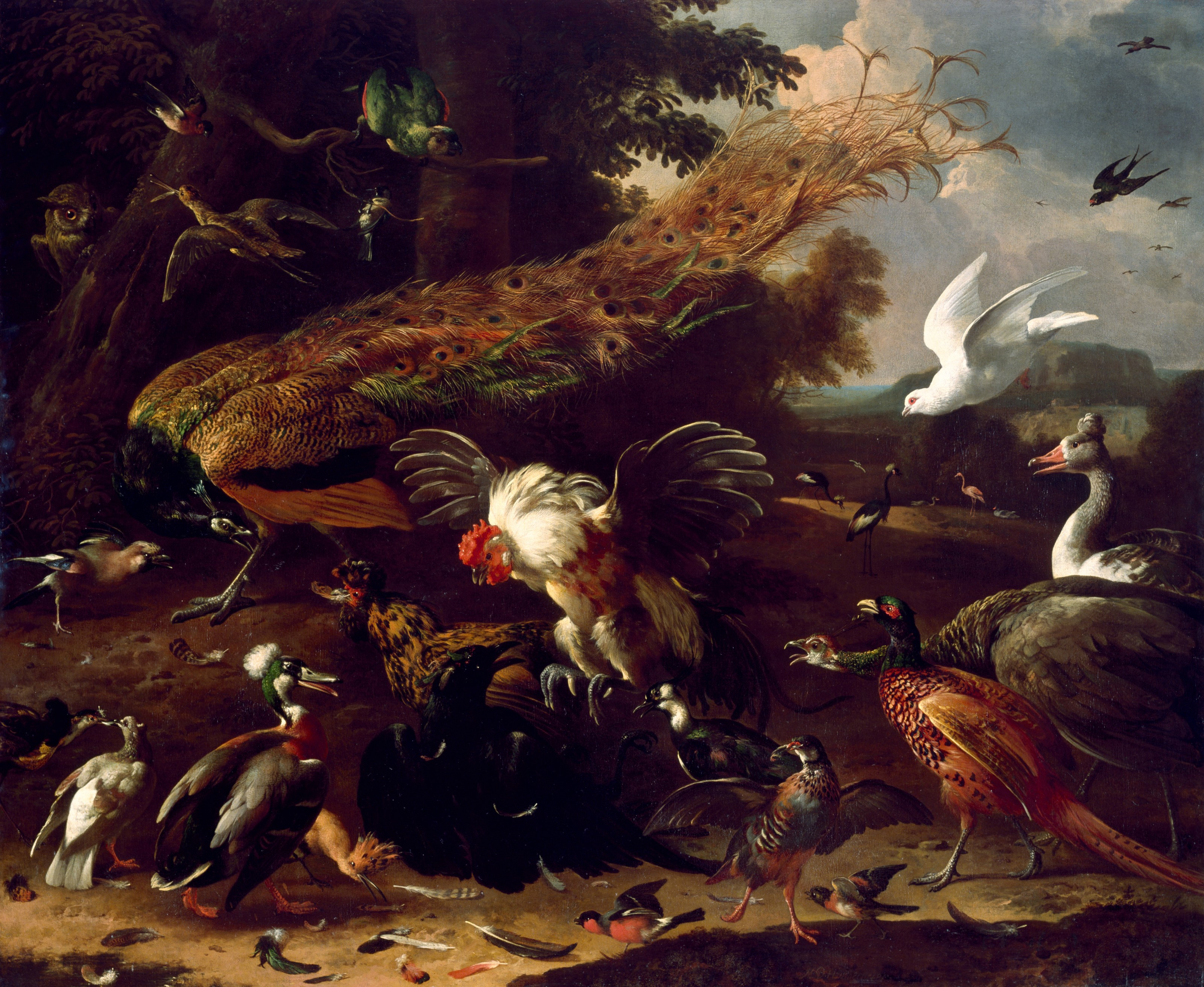
The Crow Exposed (ca. 1680), oil on canvas, 170.2 × 211.5 cm., Museum of Fine Arts, Houston

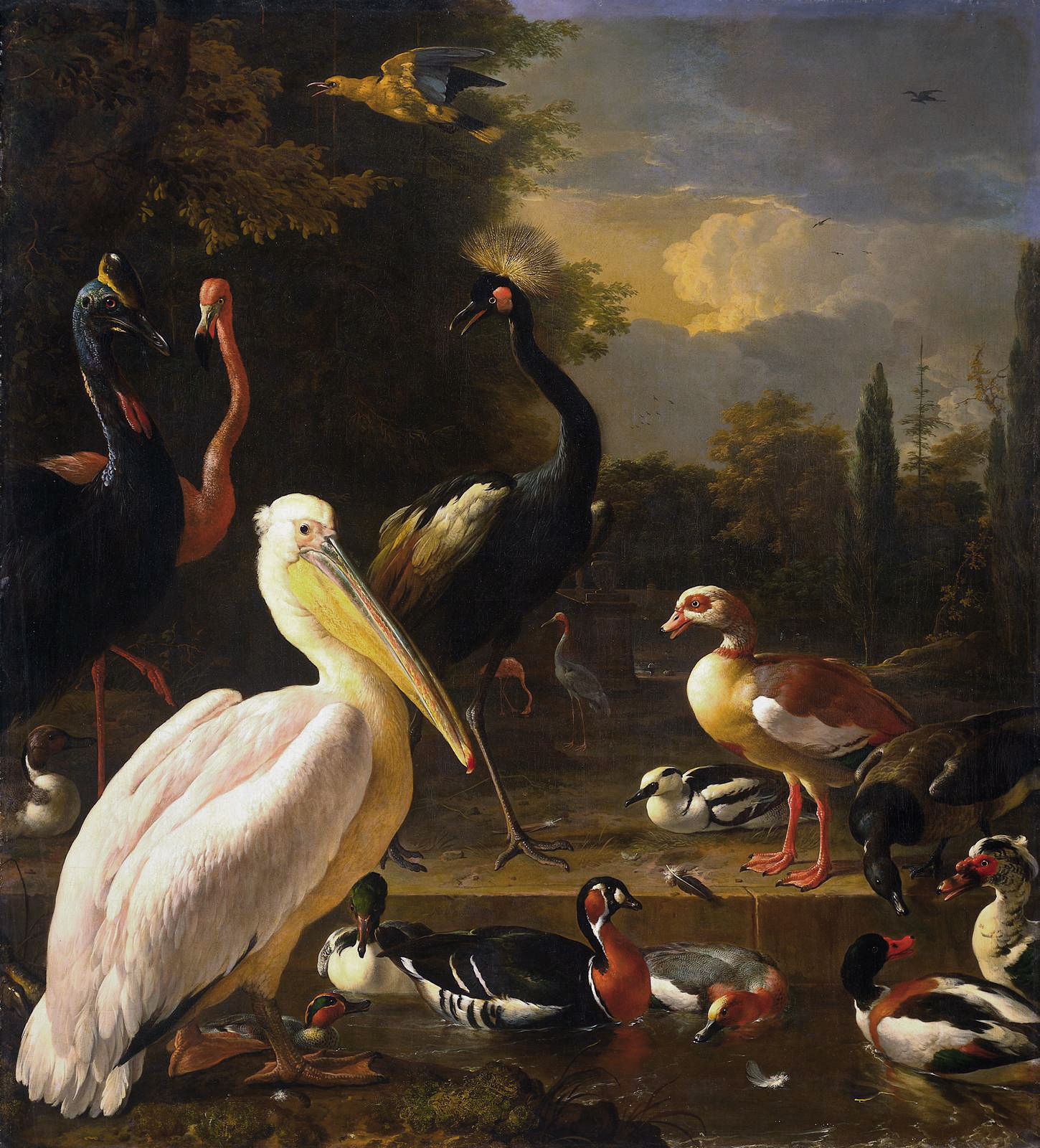
Pelican and Birds Near a Pool, "The Floating Feather" (ca. 1680), oil on canvas, 159 x144 cm., Rijksmuseum

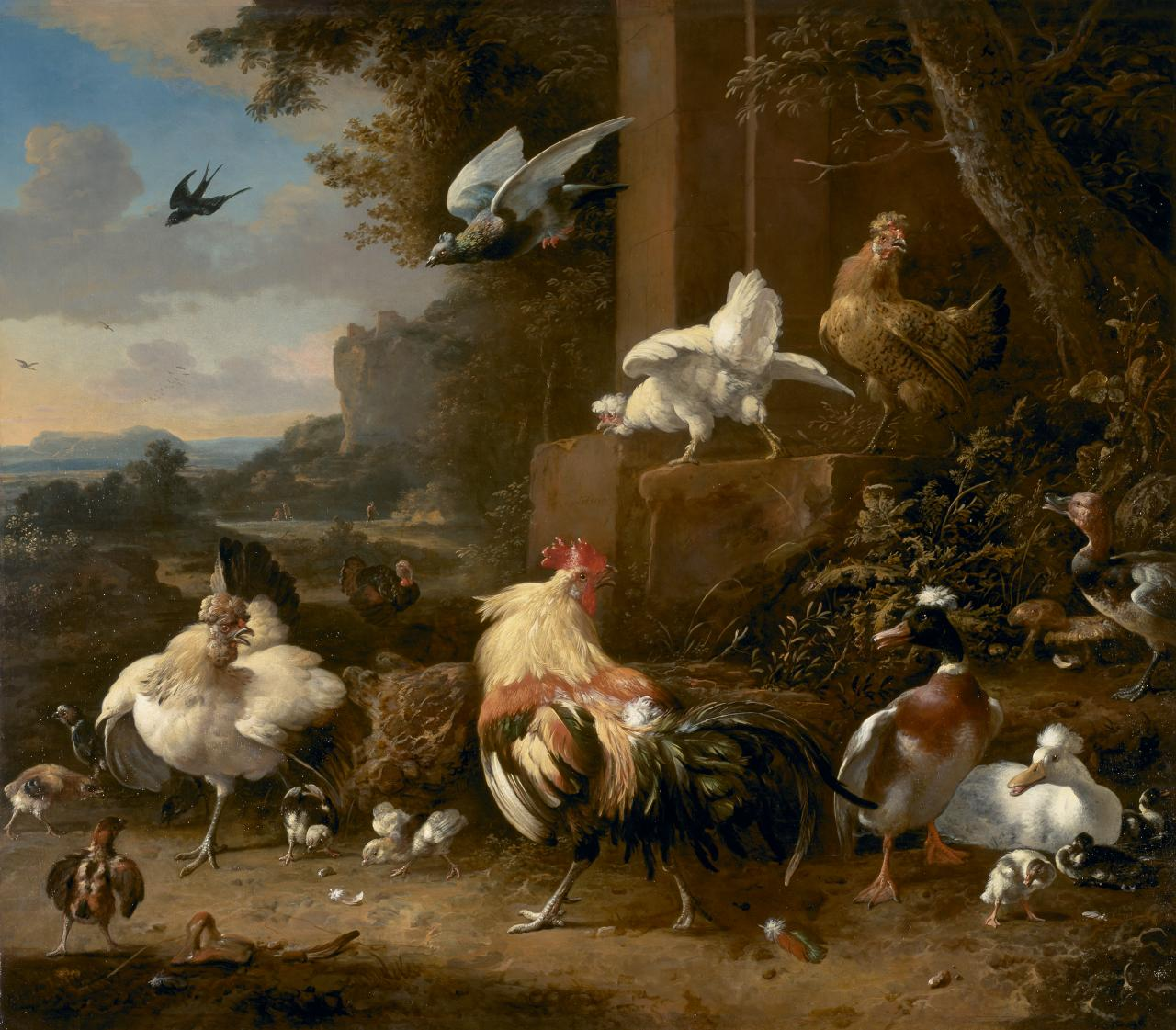
The Poultry Yard (1690s), oil on canvas, 148.2 x 170.3 cm., National Gallery of Victoria

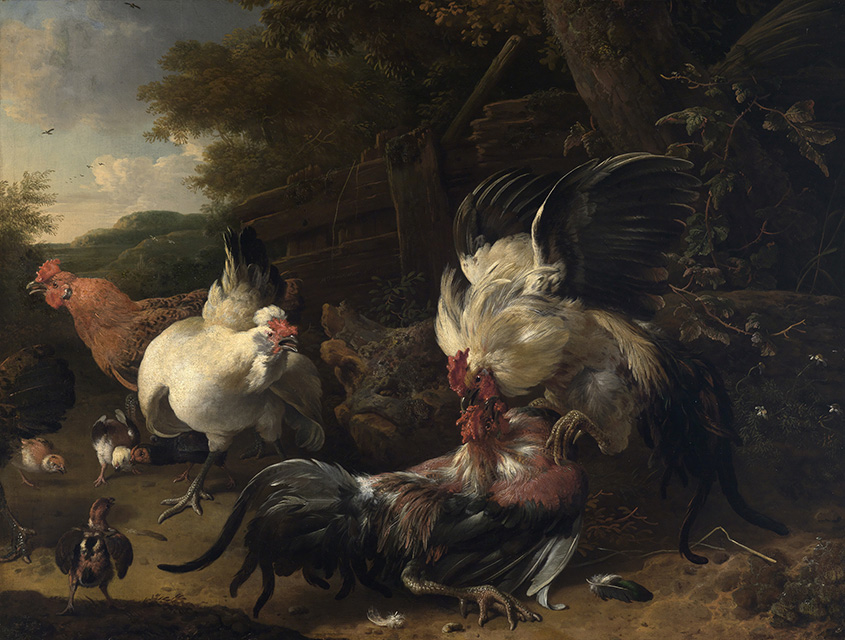
Roosters Fighting (1686), oil on canvas, 104 x 136.5 cm., Staatliche Kunsthalle Karlsruhe

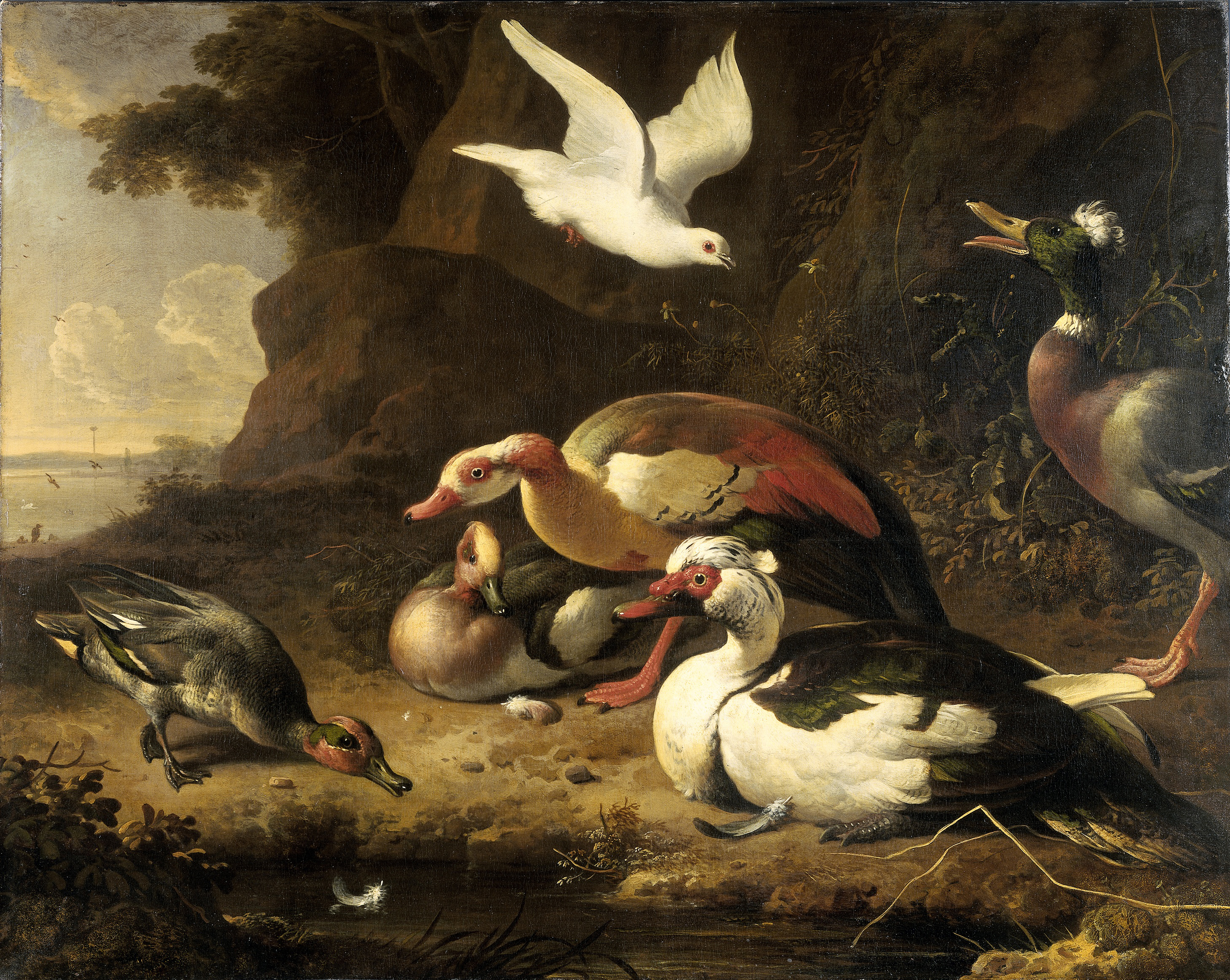
Ducks (ca. 1675-80), oil on canvas, 93 x 116 cm., Rijksmuseum

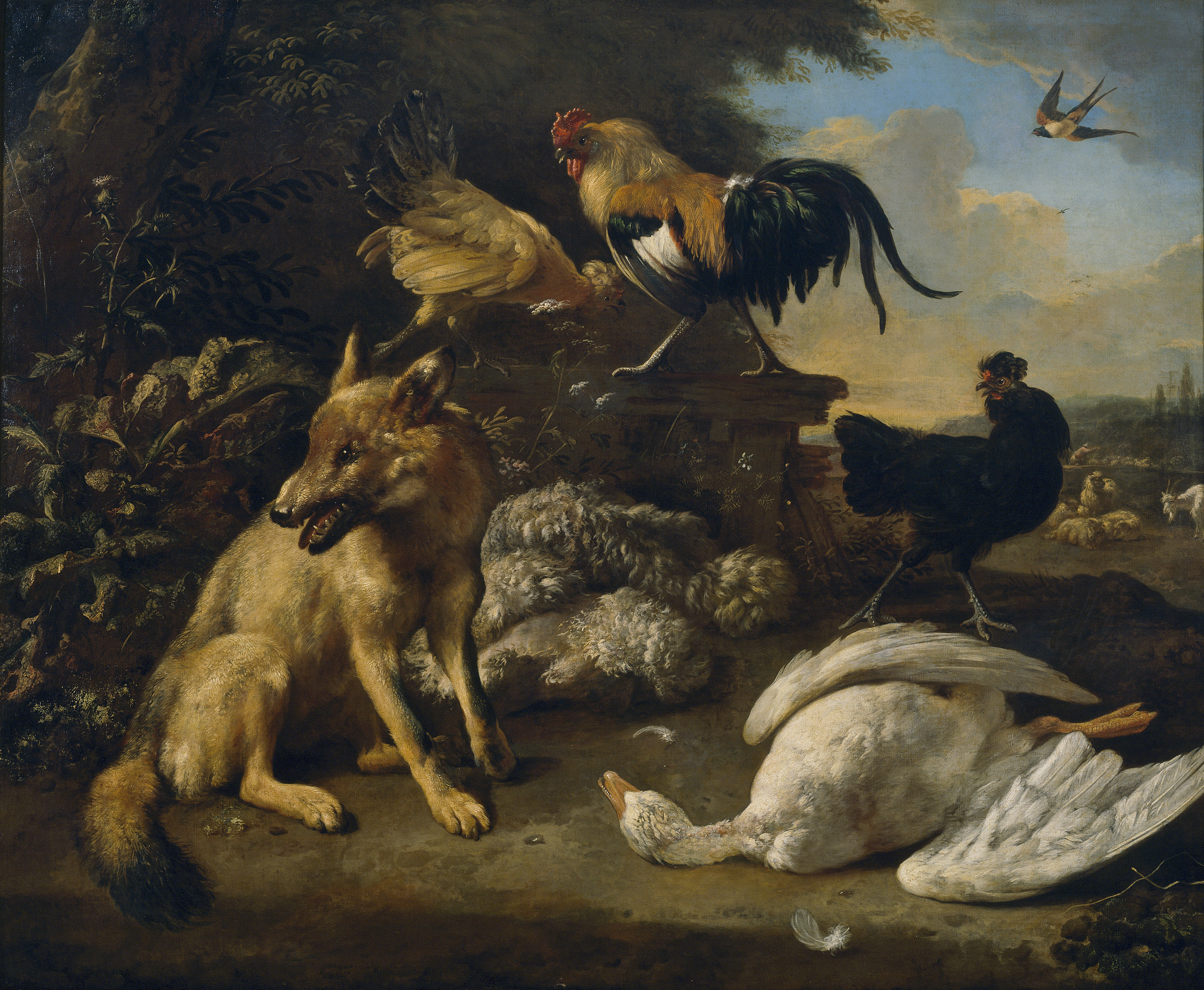
Still Life with Animals (ca. 1680-90), oil on canvas, 141 x 172 cm., Museo del Prado

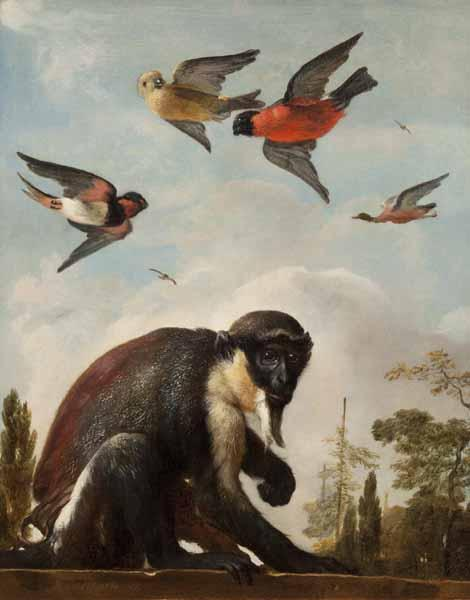
A Diana Monkey with Four Colorful Birds (ca. 1690), oil on canvas, 61.7 x 48.8 cm., Toledo Museum of Art

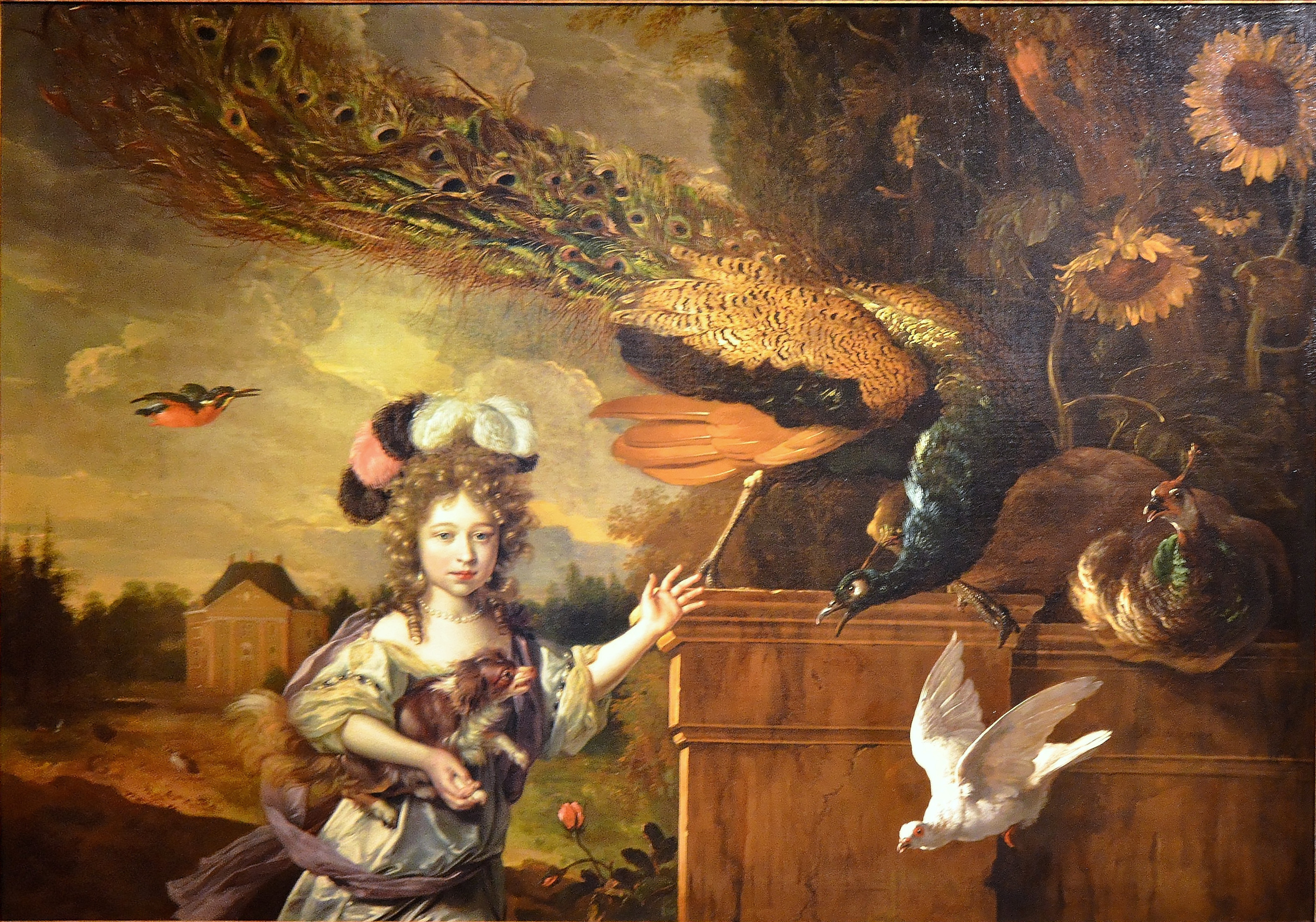
Girl with Peacocks (ca. 1680), oil on canvas, 128 x 181.7 cm., Museum of Fine Arts, Reims [girl likely painted by Jan de Baen]

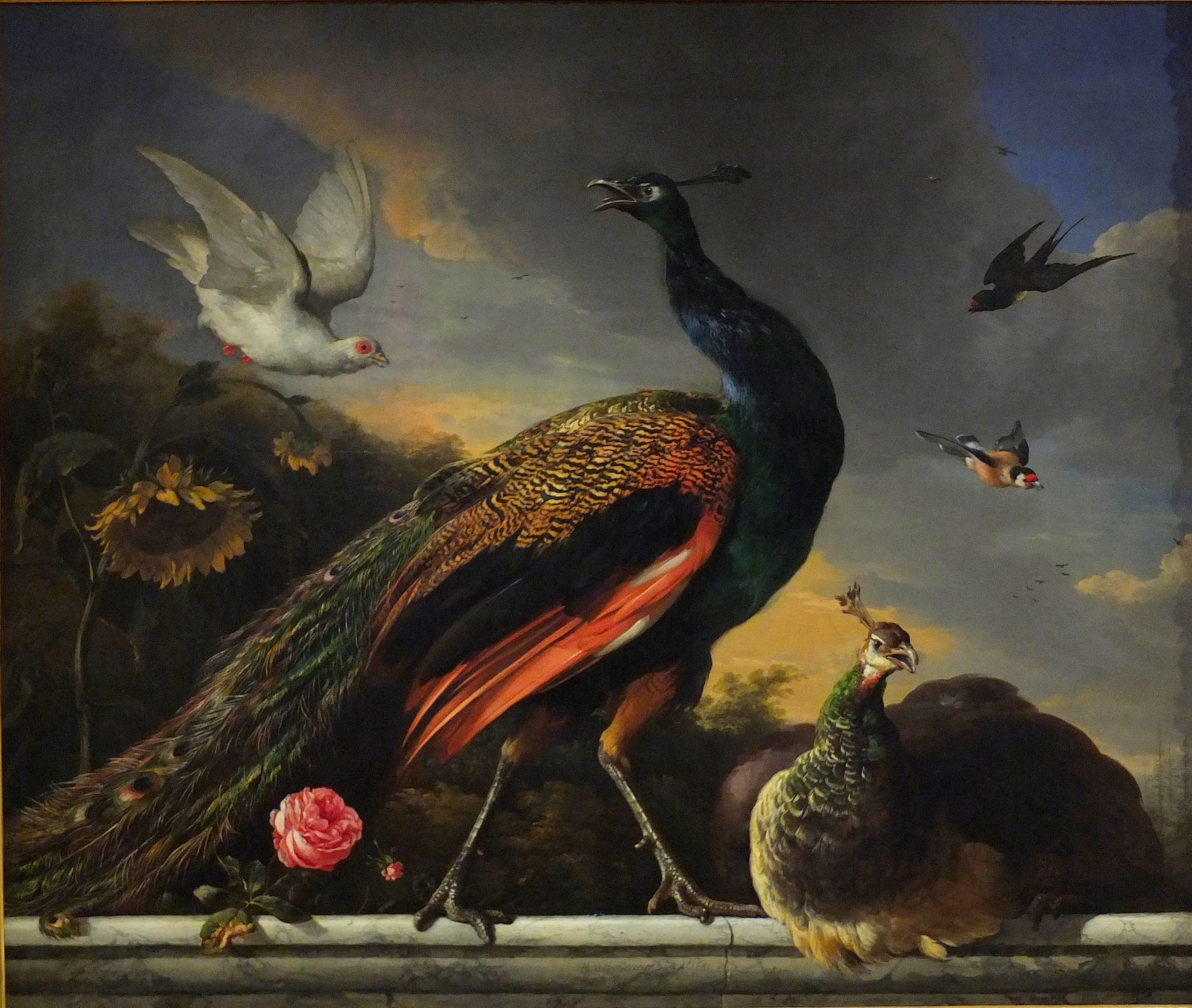
Peacocks, Male and Female (1681), oil on canvas, 1,30 x 1,30 cm., Petit Palais, Musée des Beaux-Arts de la Ville de Paris

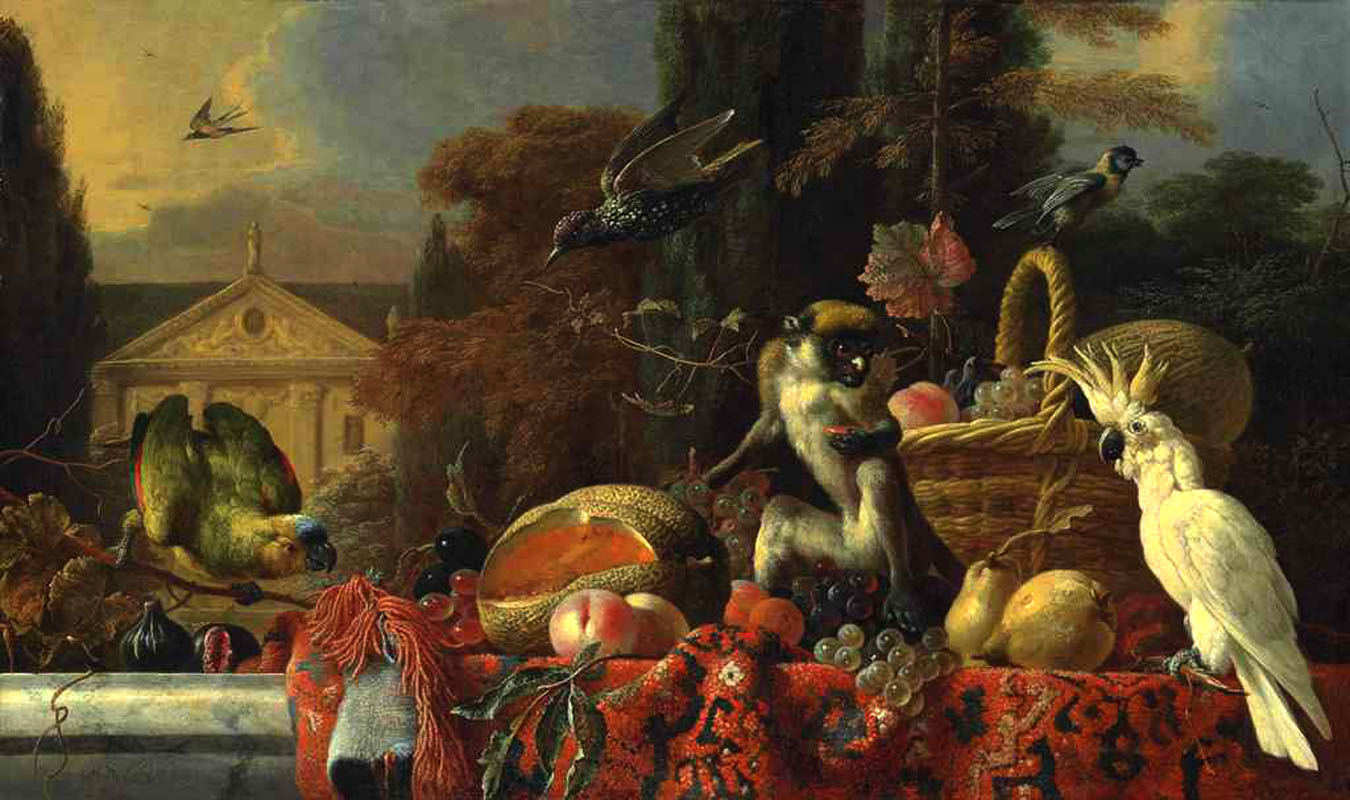
Cockatoo and Monkey by a Wicker Basket of Fruit (no date), oil on canvas. 76.5 x 127.6 cm., private collection

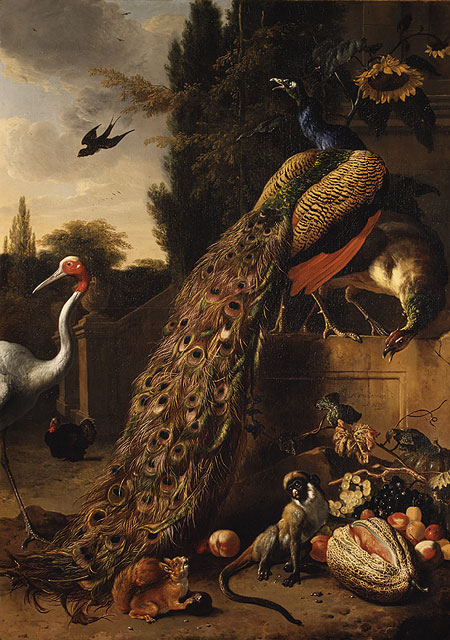
Peacocks (1683), oil on canvas, 190.2 x 134.6 cm., Metropolitan Museum of Art
