= Gillis d'Hondecoeter =

Dutch painter

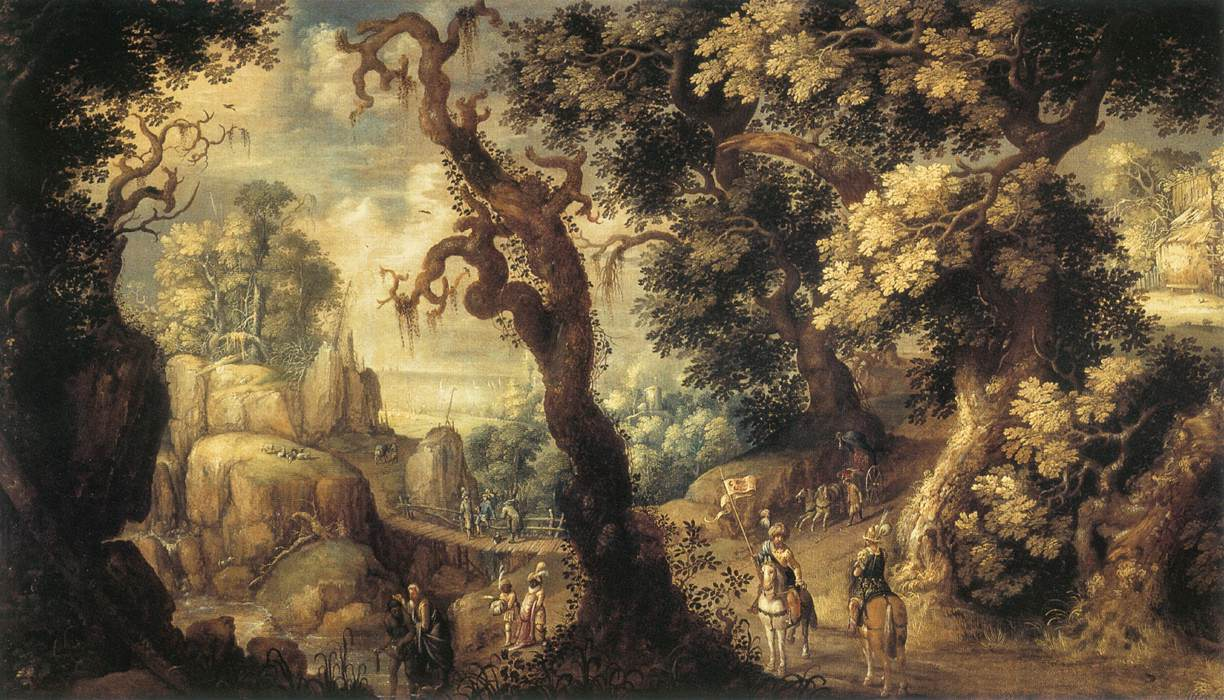
Baptism of the Moorish Chamberlain, n.d., Antwerp, Rockox House.

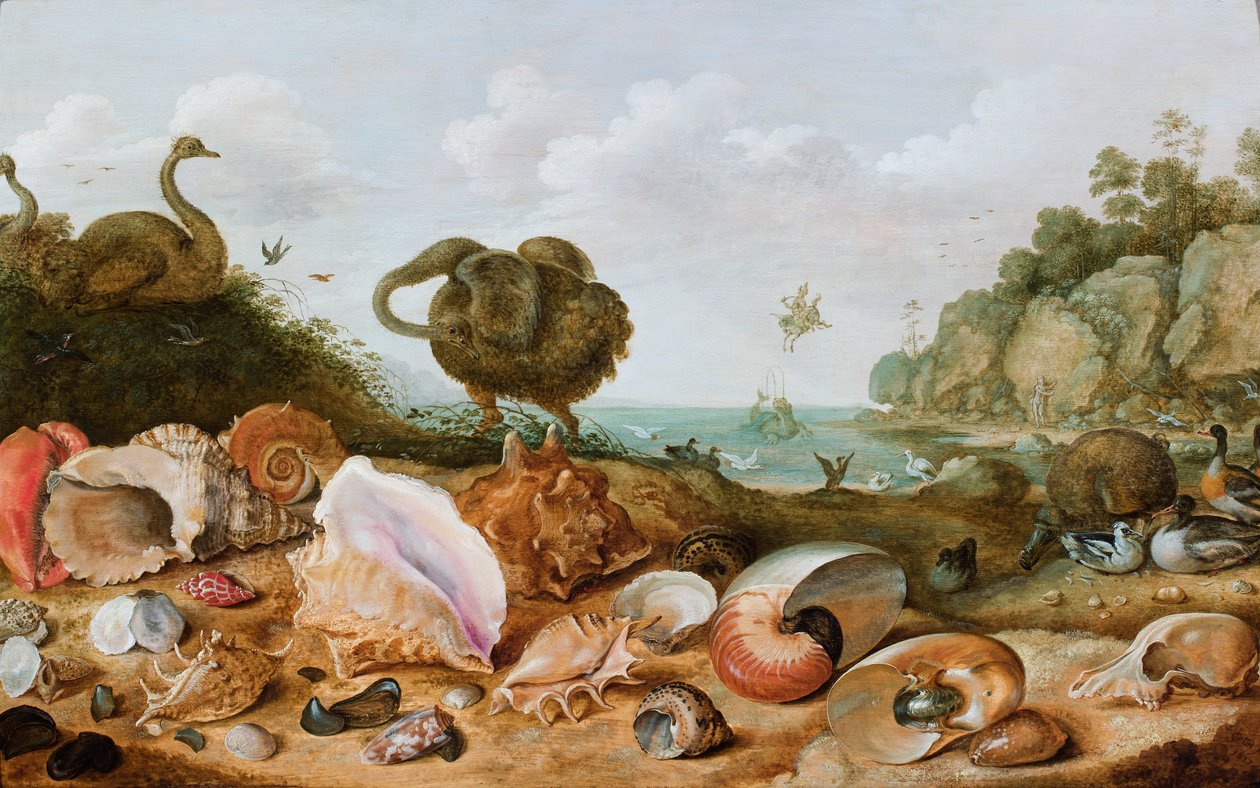
Perseus and Andromeda with a Dodo and seashells

Gillis Claesz. de Hondecoeter or d'Hondecoeter (c. 1575–1580 – buried 17 October 1638) was a Dutch painter, working in a Flemish style, painting landscapes, trees, fowl and birds. Later on d'Hondecoeter painted in a more Dutch, realistic style. Gillis was the father of Gijsbert d'Hondecoeter and grandfather of the more successful Melchior d'Hondecoeter and Jan Weenix. His daughter Josijntje married Jan Baptist Weenix.

== Life ==
Gillis d'Hondecoeter was born in Antwerp, the son of Nicolaes Jansz d'Hondecoeter, a painter who fled from Antwerp to Delft after the Spanish occupied the city in 1585. Gillis married in 1602 Maaijke Gijbrechts in Delft, while working in Utrecht. The couple had six children, before they moved to Amsterdam in 1615, where another three children were baptized. His brother was a surgeon in that city.

In 1622 his wife died. Six years later he married the young and (probably) beautiful Anna Spierinx, who first had refused his son Gijsbert, according to Arnold Houbraken. The couple lived on Singel and had one child together. Hondecoeter died in Amsterdam.

== Works ==
Gillis, his son Gijsbert, working in Utrecht and both his grandchildren specialized in fowl and birds, using probably a small gallow, as was mentioned in the inventory of his grandson Melchior de Hondecoeter. Gillis painted Flemish, hilly, fantasy landscapes, most of the time in connection with a biblical scene. It is said he was influenced by Roelant Savery, a Flemish painter who also moved in Amsterdam. The figures on one of his paintings he left to his colleague, David Vinckboons.
