= Ykens =

Ykens is a Flemish surname. Notable people with the surname include:

- Catarina Ykens (I) (1608–after 1666), Flemish painter
- Catarina Ykens (II) (born 1659, death unknown), Flemish painter
- Frans Ykens (1601–1693), Flemish still life painter
- Johannes Ykens (1613–after 1680), Flemish painter and sculptor
- Peter Ykens (1648–1695), Flemish painter
