= Ferdinand van Kessel =

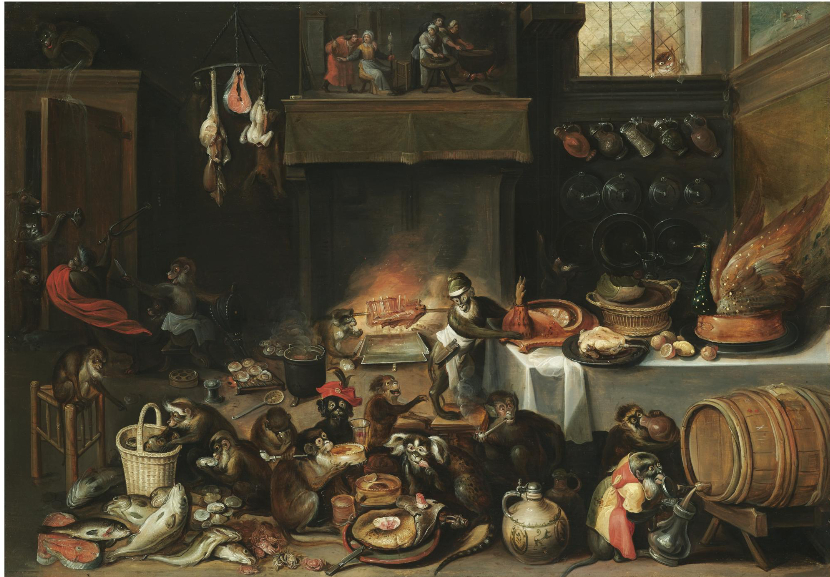
Apes in the kitchen

Ferdinand van Kessel (1648 – 1696), was a Flemish Baroque painter known for his landscapes, still lifes and genre pieces with monkeys.

== Life ==
He was born in Antwerp as the son of Jan van Kessel the Elder, who was the grandson of Jan Brueghel the Elder. He trained with his father from 1663. He moved to Breda where he was the teacher of Jacob Campo Weyerman and Louis de Moni.

He died in Breda.

== Work ==
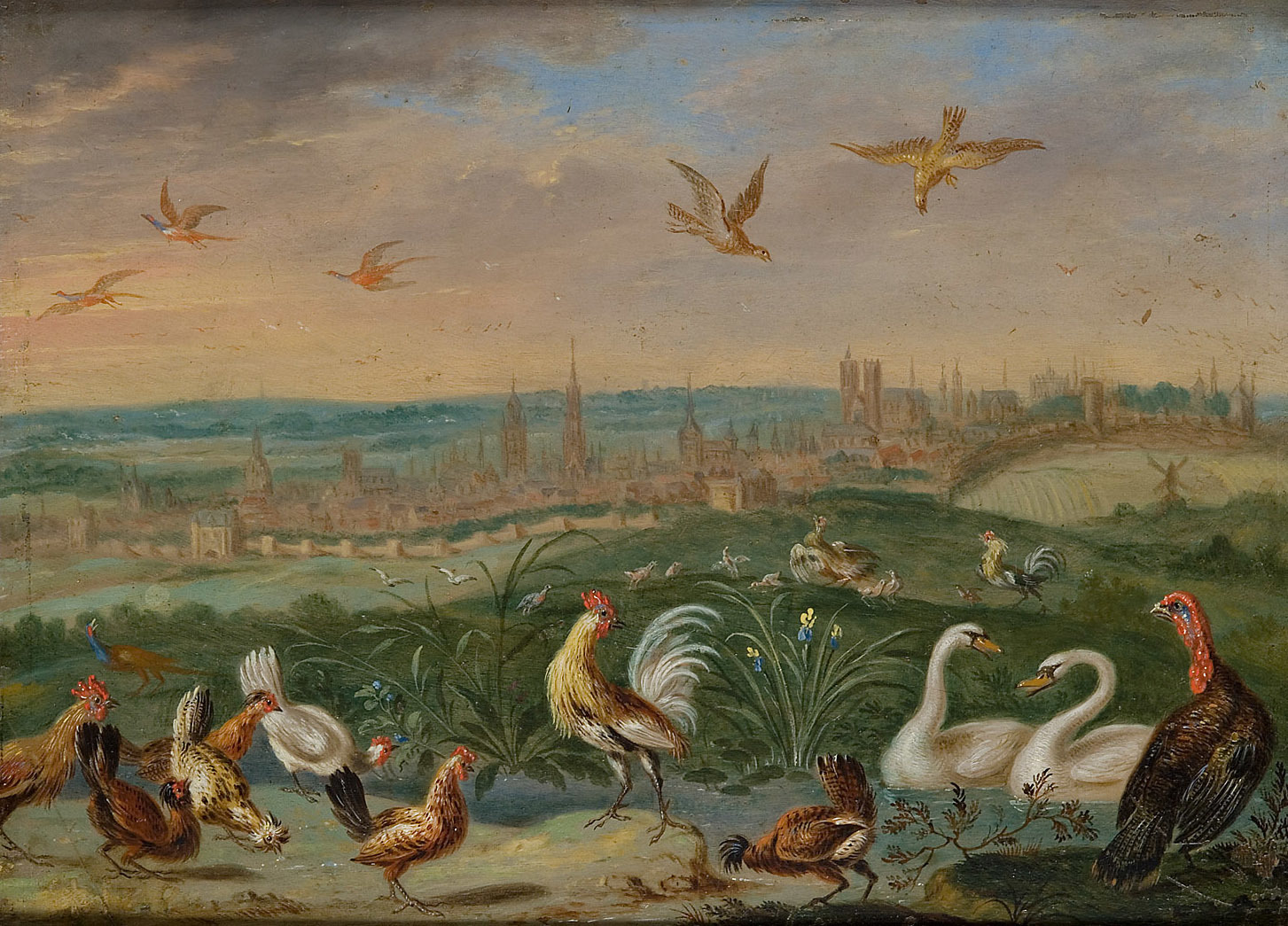
Brussels

According to Weyerman, Ferdinand's father was well known in his own day and only tipped his hat to Jan Brueghel the Elder, who was the "Phoenix of landscape paintings with animals and birds". Though Ferdinand never achieved the level of his father, he was true to the van Kessel-Brueghel family name, and after Jan Brueghel the Younger died he was the only painter in Antwerp who carried on the family tradition. He was discovered by Mr. Molo, a representative of the Polish king John III Sobieski who sent a few of his cabinet pieces to Poland. When these were well received, he invited van Kessel to come to Breda to make enough paintings to decorate a whole room in the Wilanów Palace. Van Kessel subsequently moved to Breda to fulfill this commission according to the taste of the Polish King. He began by painting scenes of the four elements on a sheet of copper three by four and a half feet wide. The four elements were each represented by cherubs, and the first painting was of a boy seated on an eagle representing Air, surrounded by birds. Earth was a boy resting his arm on the back of a lion, surrounded by herbs, fruits and flowers. Fire was a boy surveying implements of war, with gold and silver inlaid harness, drums, embroidered silk banners and spears with damask coverlets, with a small monkey smoking a pipe and drinking a glass of rossoly (rosée du soleil). Water was a boy leaning on a crock symbolizing God's water source at the edge of a river surrounded with sea and river fish in the water, and pearls, corals and shells on shore. The whole was framed in ebony with a gold edging and surrounded by fourteen or fifteen symbols of the elements.

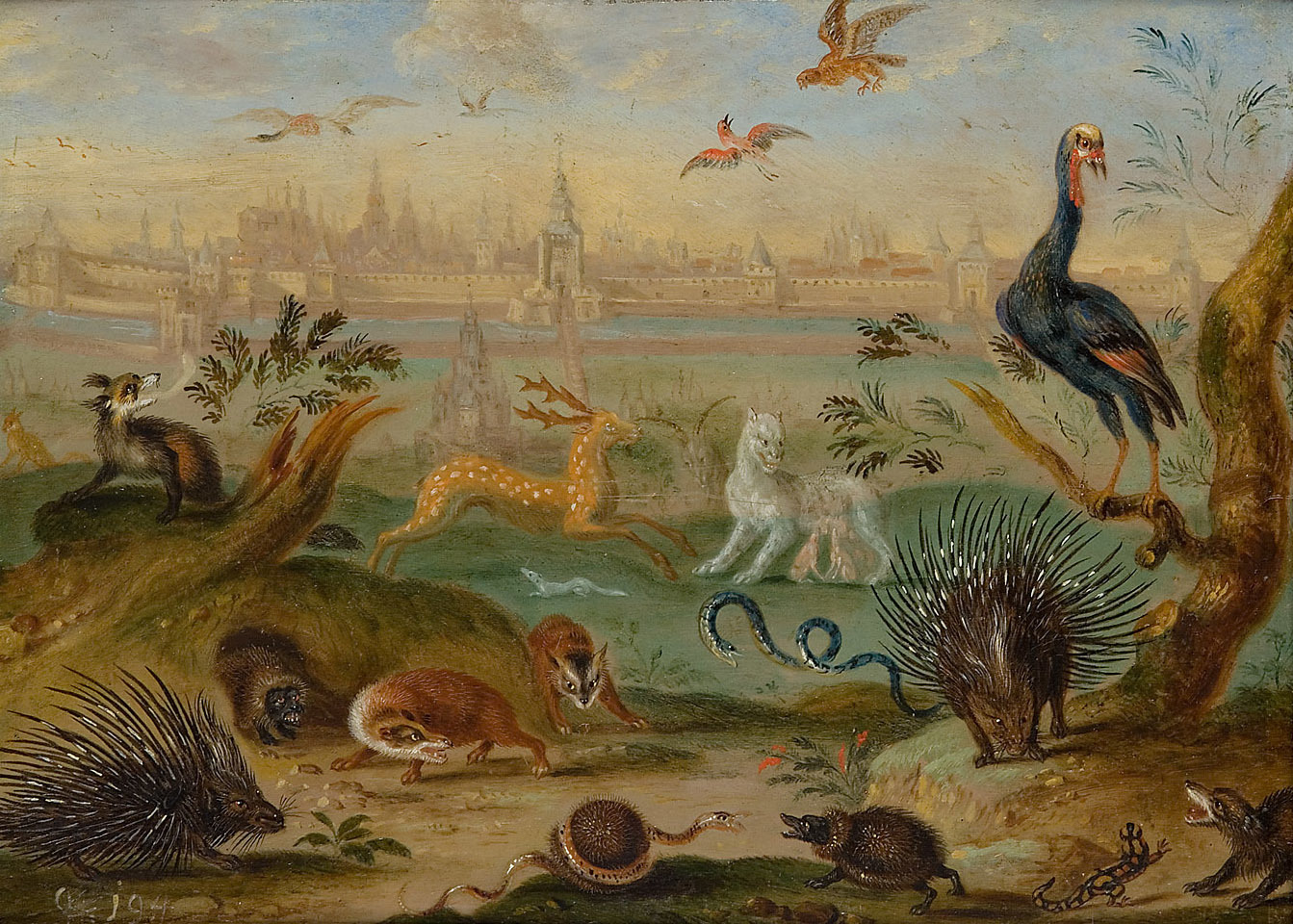
Moscow

This work was so well received that van Kessel was invited to make another series of the four continents for the King of Poland. Van Kessel continued to make paintings for him from his home in Breda and refused an invitation to work at the Polish court. When a fire damaged his paintings in Poland, he quickly offered to repaint the lost pieces from sketches he had made. He continued to fulfill commissions from Poland himself and subcontracted some of the work to other Antwerp painters (Historical allegories: Frans Ykens, Maas, Caspar Jacob van Opstal, Charles Emmanuel Biset; Landscapes: Pieter Spierinckx, Rysbregts, Peter van de Velde, Abraham Genoels; Flowers: Gaspar Peeter Verbruggen, Jan Baptist Bosschaert, Simon Hardimé, and Jan Pauwel Gillemans the Younger). This lasted until the death of the King in 1696, when his patron Mr. Molo refused to pay for commissions already commenced but not completed.

Van Kessel also made a ceiling painting for the palace of William III of Orange in Breda.
