= Herck =

Herck is a surname. Notable people with the surname include:

- Michael Herck (born 1988), Romanian-Belgian retired racing driver
- Tom Herck (born 1984), multidisciplinary Belgian artist

== See also ==
- Van Herck, a Flemish and Dutch surname
- Glen D. VanHerck (born 1962), American general
- Herk (disambiguation)
