= Catarina Ykens =

Catarina Ykens may refer to one of the following 17th and 18th century painters:

- Catarina Ykens (I) (1608–after 1666), a Flemish painter.
- Catarina Ykens (II) (born 1659), a Flemish painter.
