= Bart Ramakers =

Belgian artist and art curator

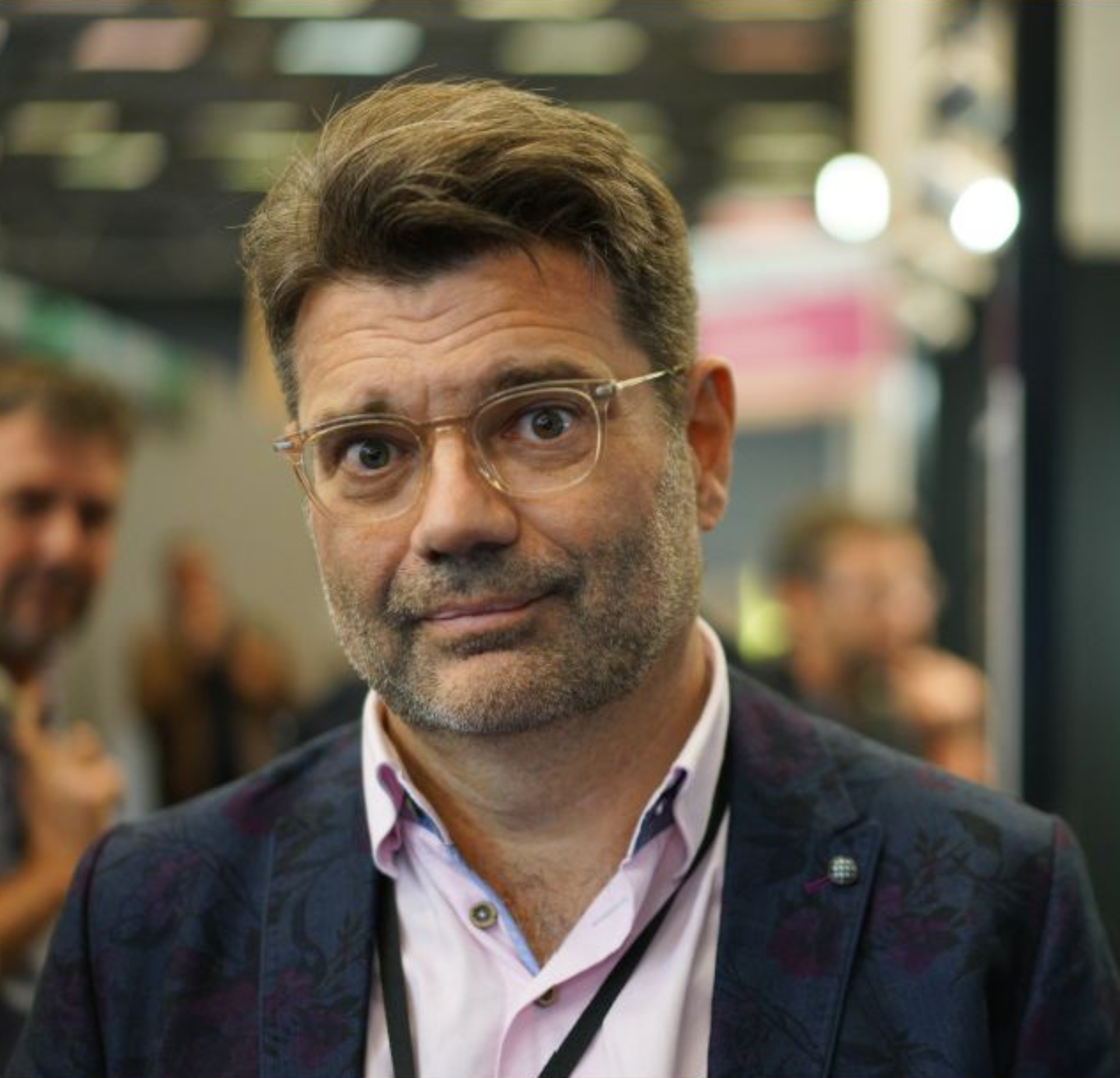
Bart Ramakers at the Salon de la Photo, Paris 2017

Bart Ramakers (born 1963) is a Belgian artist and art curator. He is known for the staged photographs in which he creates a "mythology for a new world". His works also include video and sculpture.

Ramakers reworks classic mythological and religious themes in the light of actuality: gender equality, environment, and solidarity, often with a nod to art history. His collaborations include Panamarenko, Tom Herckrck, William Sweetlove, Cecilia Paredes among others.

== Life and work ==
Ramakers was born in 1963, near Maaseik, and was influenced by his father, an art amateur. He studied drawing at the academies of Maaseik and Maasmechelen and history at the Katholieke Universiteit Leuven. During his studies, he was active as a cartoonist, illustrator and graphical artist in several student publications, such as Veto. After graduating, Ramakers worked in advertising and marketing until he started his artistic career in 2009.

== Selected projects ==
- The Apotheosis of Flora, for the D'Ursel Castle and De Notelaer in Hingene, 2013
- Strangers in the Night, 2014
- A Divine Comedy, 2016
- The Anatomy of Beauty, 2017
- Autopia - Automats for a New World, 2018
- Flora and the Water Warriors, with William Sweetlove, 2019
- The Bride Unveiled, 2021
- Sandwiched, 2022
- Ex Tenebris Lux, 2025

== Selected exhibitions ==
- Sweet 18, in the Castle d'Ursel, 2015
- Autopia, in Wilford X Temse, 2018
- Weill ich ein Mädchen bin, Odapark Venray, 2018
- Anastasia, with William Sweetlove and Roel Stels, Lier, 2020

Group exhibitions curated by Bart Ramakers include:

- One big Family, with Caroline Bouchard, Alden Biesen Castle, 2015
- Hallelujah!, Triamant Gerkenberg Bree, 2021
- Paris Photo, November 2024
- International Photo Biënnal Ostend, September-November 2025

== Publications ==
Bart Ramakers' work is published in the books:

- Trouble in Paradise, 2015
- Revelations, 2018
- Flora and the Water Warriors, 2019
- The Bride Unveiled, 2021
- Ex Tenebris Lux, 2026
