= Louis de Moni =

Dutch painter

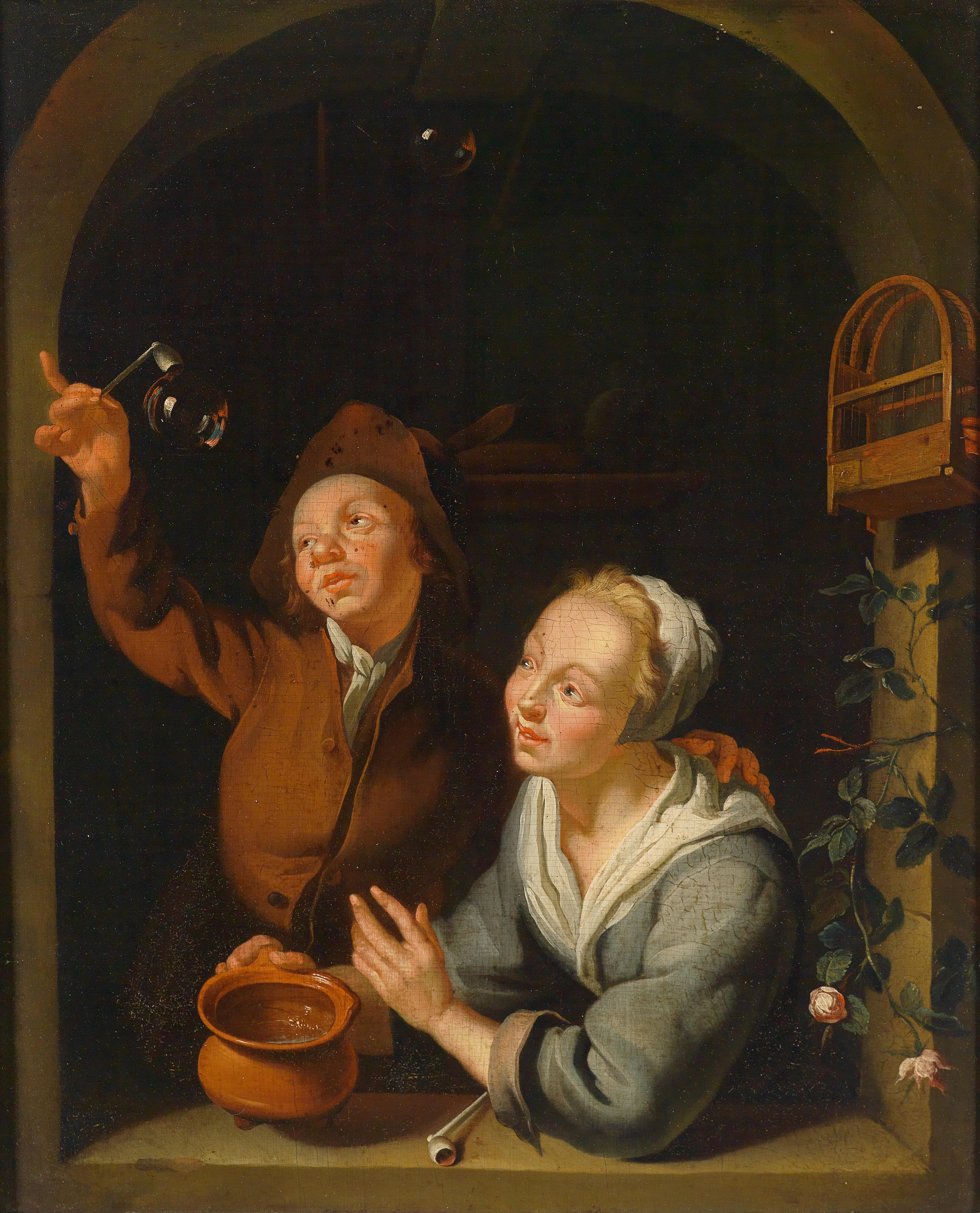
Couple blowing soap bubbles

Louis de Moni (1698–1771) was an 18th-century genre painter from the Dutch Republic.

== Biography ==
De Moni was born in Breda. According to the RKD he was a pupil of Van Kessel and J. B. Biset in Breda, and from 1721 to 1725 he attended the Hague drawing academy associated with the Confrerie Pictura, where he studied with Philip van Dyk. He studied the works of Gerard Dou, and imitated the manner of Mieris. He accompanied Philip van Dyk to Cassel in 1726, and afterwards settled at Leyden, where he died in 1771. His paintings consist of portraits and genre pieces of a simple and pleasing character, though cold in colouring. These are painted by him:

- A Woman watering Flowers (Rijksmuseum Amsterdam)
- The Lacemaker, 1742 (The Hague, Mauritshuis)
- Scene galante (Palais des Beaux-Arts de Lille)
- A Family Scene (Paris, Louvre)
- A Fish-Woman and The Bon Vivant, 1723 (St. Petersburg, Hermitage)
- A Fish-Seller (Rotterdam, Museum Boijmans Van Beuningen)
- A Girl at a Window (Belvedere, Vienna)
