= Jacob Leyssens =

Flemish painter and decorator

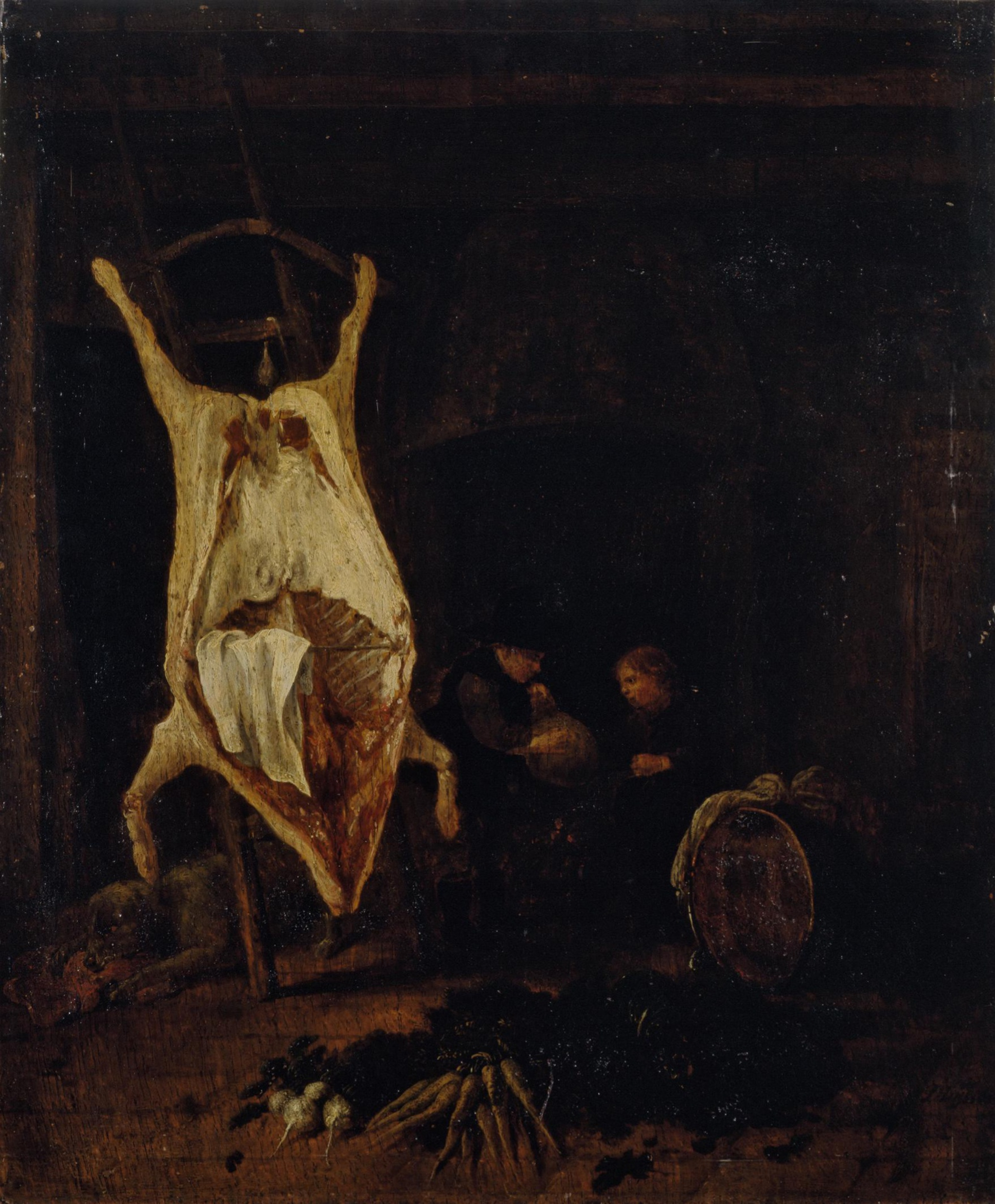
Carcass in a kitchen, early 1690s

Jacob Leyssens or Jacob Lyssens (nickname Notenkraker) (1661, Antwerp - 1710, Antwerp), was a Flemish painter and decorator. After training in Antwerp, he spent a long time in Rome. After his return to Antwerp, he was active as a painter and decorator and collaborated with prominent Antwerp still life painters such as Gaspar Peeter Verbruggen the Younger and Jan Baptist Bosschaert.

== Life ==
He was born in Antwerp in 1661 as the son of Jacobus and Anthonetta Sas. He was registered as a pupil of Peter Ykens in the Antwerp Guild of Saint Luke in 1674. He travelled to Rome at a young age as he is mentioned there in 1680. He became a member of the Bentvueghels, an association of mainly Dutch and Flemish artists working in Rome, with the 'bentname' 'Notenkraker' (Nutcracker). In his biography of Leyssens (referred to as N. Lyssens), the early Dutch biographer Jacob Campo Weyerman claims that this bentname was chosen because of Leyssens' big nose. He was probably one of the youngest Bentvueghels ever admitted.

The difficult financial situation of his father caused him to return to return to Antwerp. He was admitted as a 'wijnmeester' (wine master) in the Antwerp Guild of Saint Luke in the guild year 1698–1699. As this was typically a title reserved for the sons of members of the Guild, it demonstrates that his father was or had been also a member of the Guild (although there is no record of his father in the Guild's records). In the year in which he became a master he received Jan Baptist Bellenraet and Jan Sas as pupils.

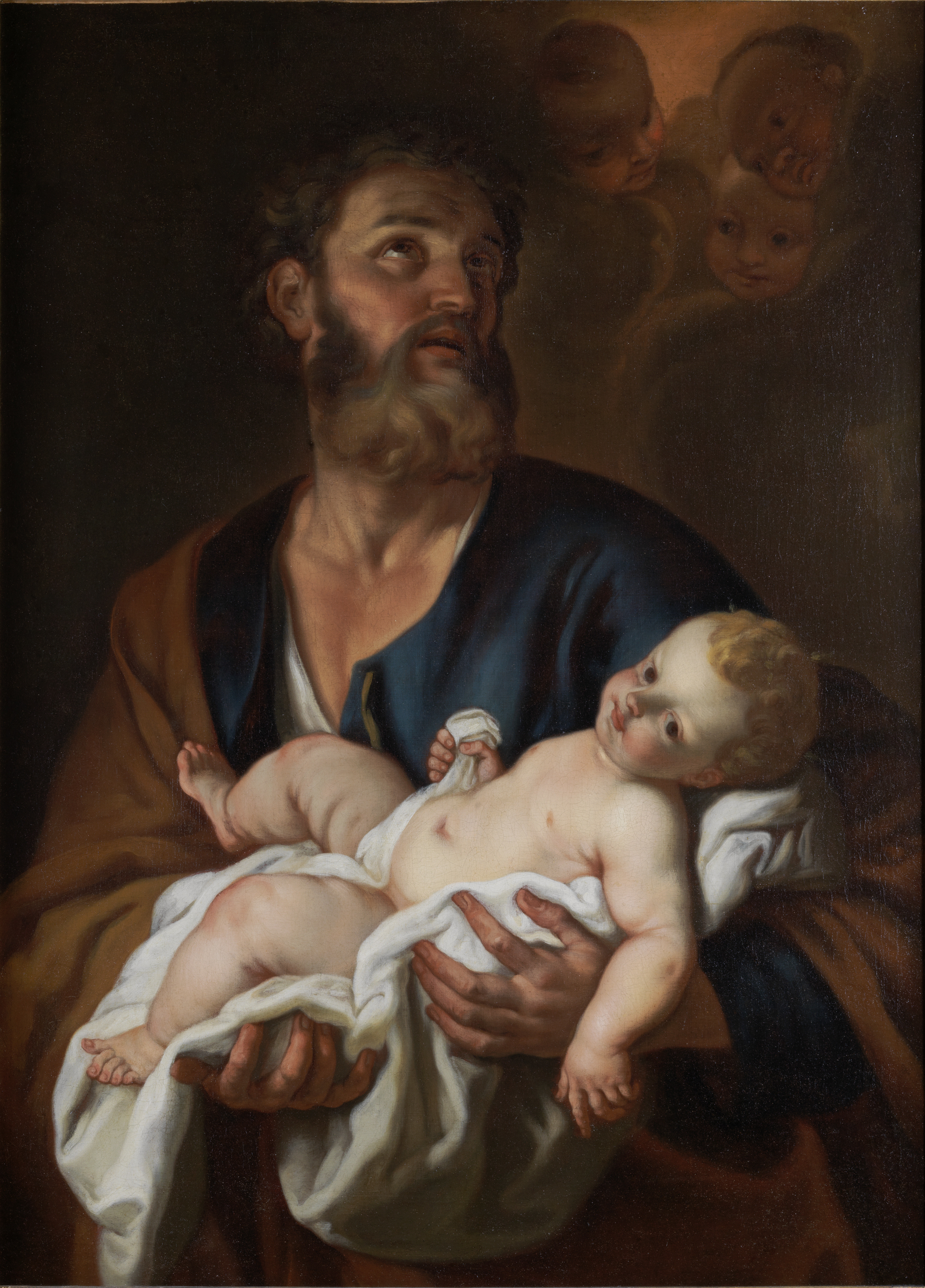
St Joseph with the child Jesus

He was active in Antwerp as a painter and decorator in the period 1698–1710. He made a will on 31 January 1706 as he was ill. He lived at the time with his father in Hopland in Antwerp.

According to records of Antwerp Cathedral, Jacob Leyssens was buried in the graveyard of the Cathedral on 14 November 1710. He was resident on the Schoenmarkt in Antwerp at the time of his death.

== Work ==
Only a few of his works are known, one of which is in the collection of the Hermitage Museum in Saint Petersburg. He decorated many rooms and ceilings in prominent residences and buildings in Antwerp. He is known to have collaborated as a staffage painter with other artists such as Jan Baptist Bosschaert and Gaspar Peeter Verbruggen the Younger, who painted the flowers and fruits. Weyerman praises Leyssens' skill in depicting the female nude and, with his usual penchant for exaggeration, claims that Leyssens painted his nudes with "sky blue eyes and such white breasts as round as apples that some viewers were deeply moved by those charming objects."

Weyerman referred to Jacob Leyssens as a history painter, which suggests that he painted in this genre. A religious painting entitled St. Joseph with the Child Jesus was listed in the inventory on the death of J.J. Moretus and was made over to the city of Antwerp in 1876 when the Plantin-Moretus printing company was sold to the city. It is now in the collection of the Plantin-Moretus Museum.
