= Jacob Melchior van Herck =

Flemish painter (1691–1735)

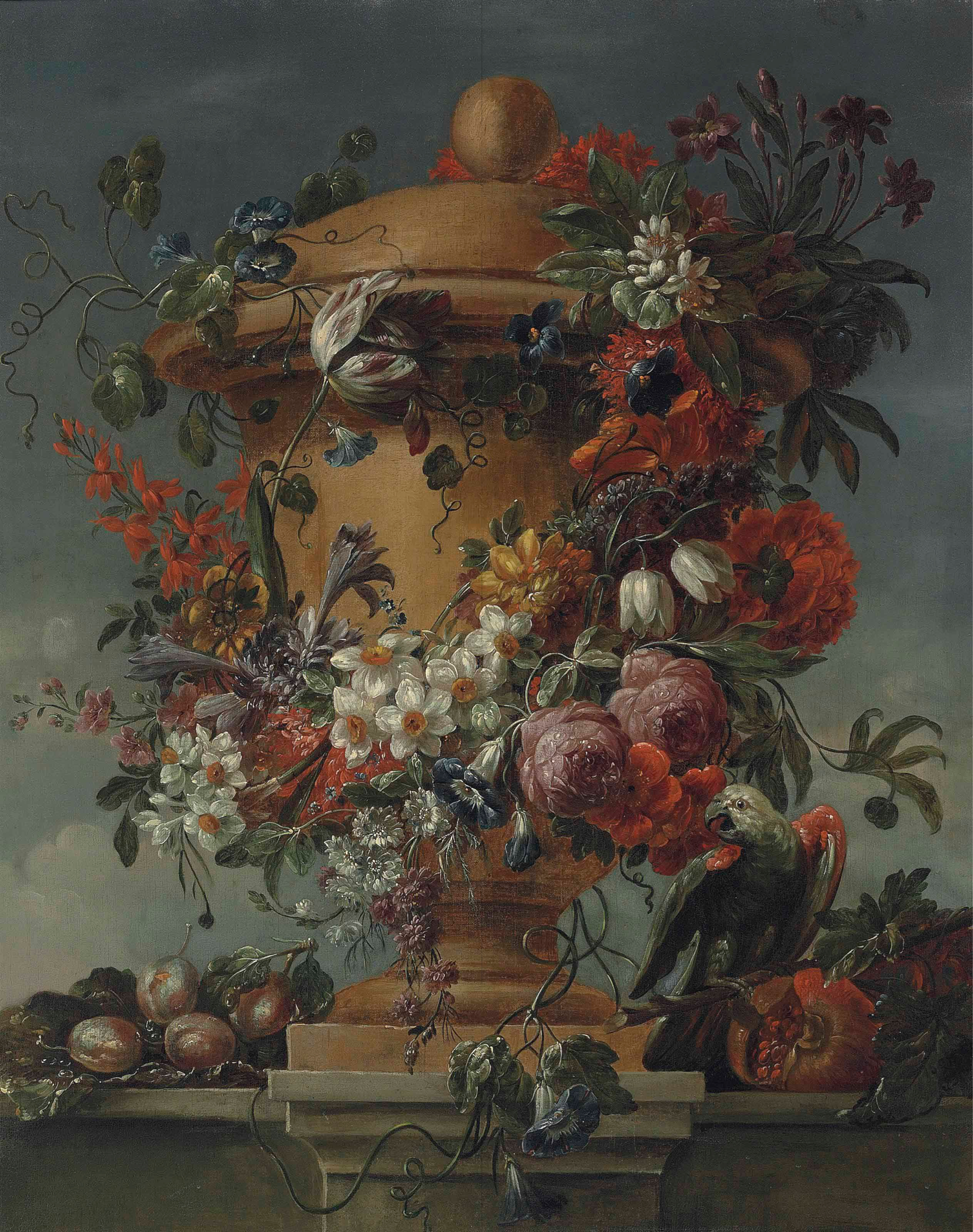
Garland of roses and other flowers in an urn, with a parrot, a pomegranate and plums on a stone ledge

Jacob Melchior van Herck or Jacobus Melchior van Herck (active in Antwerp 1691–1735) was a Flemish still life painter active in Antwerp. He is principally known for his flower and fruit still lifes. He collaborated with figure painters in the creation of allegorical and mythological scenes with an important still life element.

== Life ==
Little is known about the life of Jacob Melchior van Herck. His birthplace and birth date are unknown. He was registered in the guild year 1691–1692 at the Antwerp Guild of Saint Luke as an apprentice of Gaspar Peeter Verbruggen the Younger, a leading still life painter in Antwerp. Gaspar Peeter Verbruggen the Younger was also his half-brother or possibly, his brother-in-law.

In the guild year 1694-1695 van Herck was registered as a master in the Antwerp Guild. In 1720 he became a deacon of the Guild, a position which he held for two years. He became a deacon again in 1734 and 1735. He is last mentioned in the records of the Guild in 1735.

Cornelis Moniaert was registered as his apprentice in the guild year 1698–1699.

It is not clear where or when he died but is must have been in or after 1735.

== Work ==
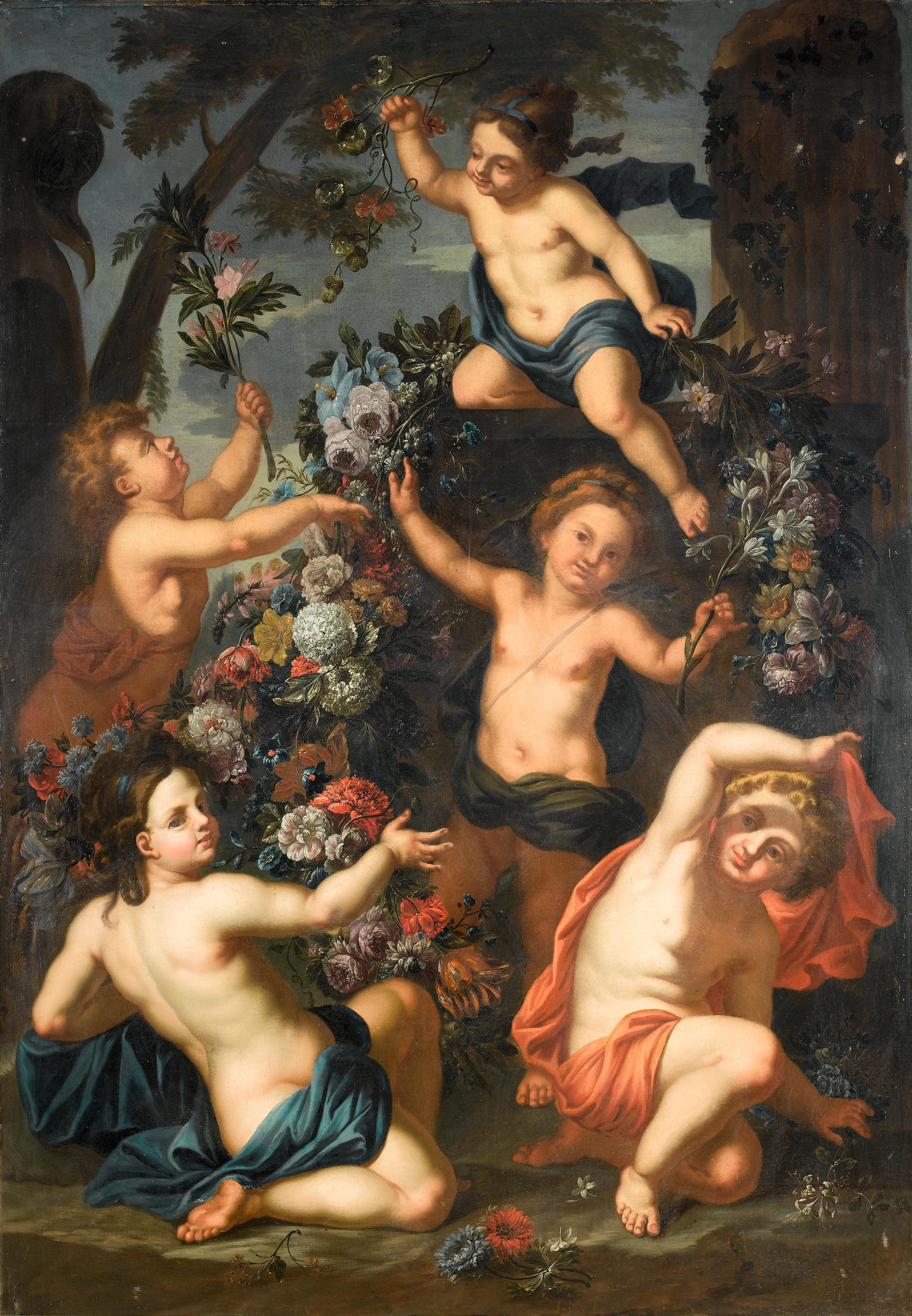
Putti amid garlands of flowers beside a stone urn

Jacob Melchior van Herck was a painter of flower and fruit still lifes. He regularly collaborated with figure painters in the creation of allegorical and mythological scenes, which incorporated important still life elements. His collaborators included François Liberti and possibly, Peter Ykens. Several of these collaborations feature putti in an outdoor setting or allegorical figures. He also collaborated on portraits such as the Portrait of Maria Luisa of Savoy (At Christie's, 13 December 2002, London, Lot 262). The portrait was likely painted by François Liberti while van Herck took care of the still life elements.

The compositions and motifs of van Herck were closely related to the opulent flower still lifes of his master Gaspar Peeter Verbruggen the Younger. His work is also regularly mixed up with that of his master's father Gaspar Peeter Verbruggen the Elder.
