= Peter Ykens =

Flemish painter

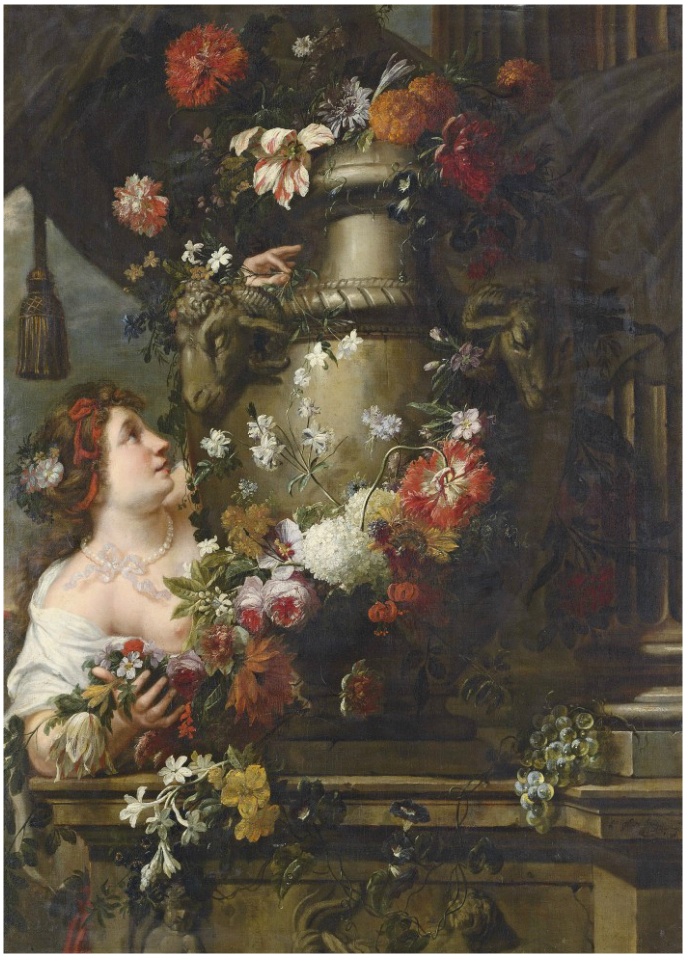
A lady adorning a sculpted urn with roses, lilies and other flowers

Peter Ykens (1648 – 1695), was a Flemish painter mainly known for his history paintings and portraits. He regularly collaborated with specialist still painters and landscape artists for whose works he provided the staffage.

== Life ==
He was born in Antwerp as the son of Johannes Ykens, a sculptor and painter, and his second wife Barbara Brekevelt. He was baptized on 30 January 1648. He was the brother of the flower painter Catarina Ykens (II). He was trained by his father. He was admitted in the guild year 1673–1674 as a master of the Antwerp Guild of Saint Luke in the capacity of a wijnmeester (son of a master).

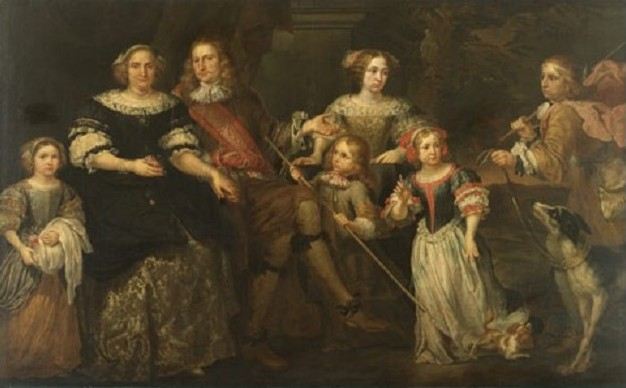
Portrait of the d'Angimont Lacroix family

According to the French biographer Jean-Baptiste Descamps Ykens intended, like so many of his compatriots, to travel to Rome, but then got married and abandoned the idea. Descamps further writes that Ykens tried to make up for this failure to visit Italy by studying prints after Italian works, Italian antiques and plaster reliefs to hone his skills.

He married Maria Anna van Bredael, daughter of the painter Peeter van Bredael on 14 July 1671. The couple had 11 or possibly 13 children. His career did not take off immediately and in the first years he had to work at a daily rate for Antoon van Leyen, an Antwerp alderman. Gradually his fortune improved and he received commissions for altarpieces in Antwerp and Mechelen. He also painted portraits including a portrait of King Charles II of Spain. He further received commissions for the design of tapestries. In 1689 he was elected dean of the Guild of Saint Luke.

He trained 28 pupils including Karel Breydel, Erasmus Causse, Gaspaer Janssens, Jan Thomas van Kessel, Henderick van Mael, Francis Scalie, Jan Baptist Kretsaert and Jacob Leyssens.

His eldest son Jan Frans became a staffage painter who collaborated with still life painters of flowers and fruit.

He died in Antwerp.

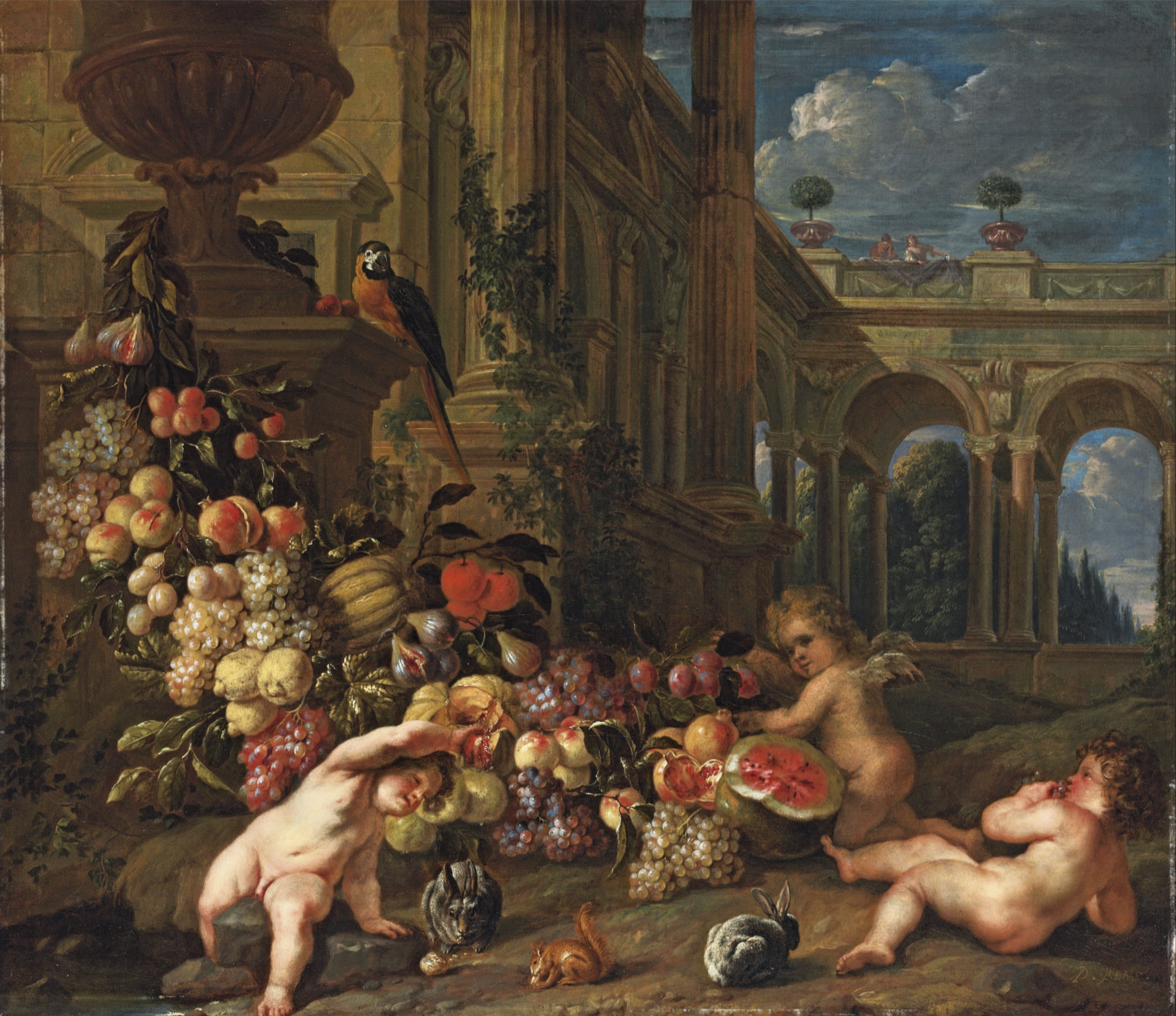
An architectural capriccio with putti, with Jan Pauwel Gillemans the Younger

== Work ==
He painted portraits and Christian religious representations and made a large number of altarpieces and paintings for local churches and palaces.

As was the custom in Antwerp at the time, he often worked together with other painters who were specialists in particular genres. He is known to have collaborated with Gaspar Peeter Verbruggen the Elder, Gaspar Peeter Verbruggen the Younger, Jan Pauwel Gillemans the Younger, Jan Baptist de Crépu and Jacob Melchior van Herck, all specialists in flower still lives, and Ferdinand van Kessel, a landscape artist. He painted the staffage while these artists contributed the still life or landscape elements to the compositions.

He provided designs for the tapestry workshops. He is believed to have collaborated with Pieter Spierinckx (1635–1711) on the design for Orpheus Playing the Lyre to Hades and Persephone (a scene from Orpheus and Eurydice or The Metamorphoses) which was woven around 1685 in the Wauters workshop in Antwerp. He also produced a series of six cartons after prints by Charles Lebrun depicting the Story of Alexander and Darius.
