= Van Herck =

Van Herck is a Flemish and Dutch surname. Notable people with the surname include:

- Edmond Van Herck (1913–2007), Belgian rower
- Jacob Melchior van Herck (active in Antwerp 1691–1735), Flemish still life painter
- Johan Van Herck (born 1974), Belgian tennis player
- Paul van Herck (1938–1989), Belgian writer
- Wilfried Van Herck (born 1946), Belgian rower

== See also ==
- Glen VanHerck (born 1962), American retired Air Force general
