= Gaspar Peeter Verbruggen the Younger =

Flemish still-life painter (1664–1730)

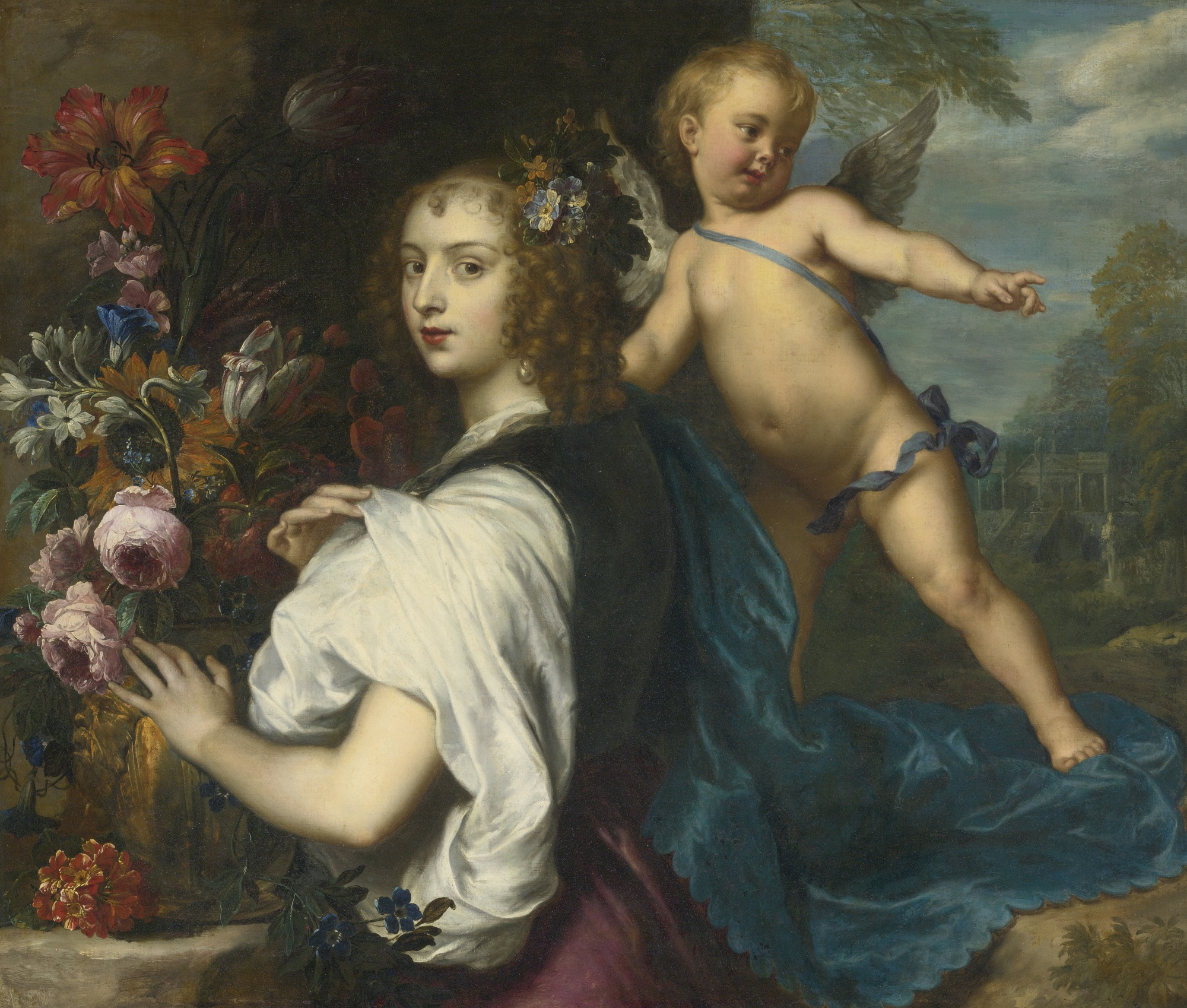
Margaret Lemon as Erminia

Gaspar Peeter Verbruggen or Gasparo Pedro Verbruggen (baptized on 11 April 1664 in Antwerp – buried on 14 March 1730 in Antwerp) was a Flemish still life painter who is principally known for his decorative still lifes with flowers and fruit. He collaborated with figure artists on compositions which combined figures with a still life element. He was active in Antwerp and The Hague.

== Life ==
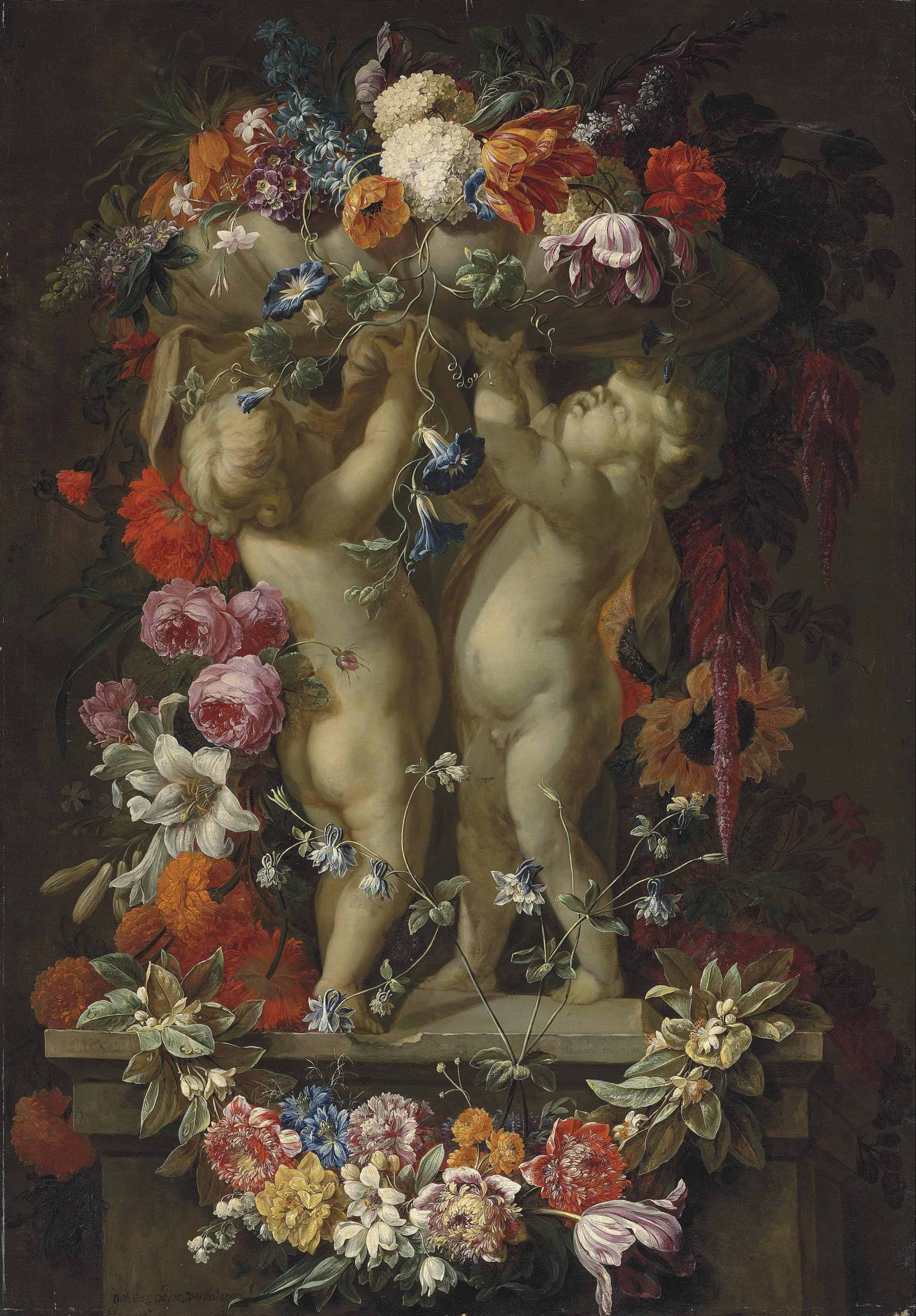
Flowers in an urn supported by sculpted putti, with a flower wreath

Gaspar Peeter Verbruggen was born in Antwerp as the son of Gaspar Peeter Verbruggen the Elder and his father's first wife Catharina van Everdonck. His father was a successful still life painter and the young Gaspar Peeter grew up in a prosperous home. His father trained him from an early age. Gaspar Peeter the Younger became in the Guild year 1677-1678 a master of the Guild of Saint Luke of Antwerp at age 13.

Verbruggen became the deacon of the Guild in the Guild year 1691/1692. In 1694 he gave one of his works called Flower garland surrounding a statue of Apollo (Royal Museum of Fine Arts Antwerp) to the Guild in thanks for accepting his pupils Balthasar Hyacinth Verbruggen and Jacob Melchior van Herck without paying a fee.

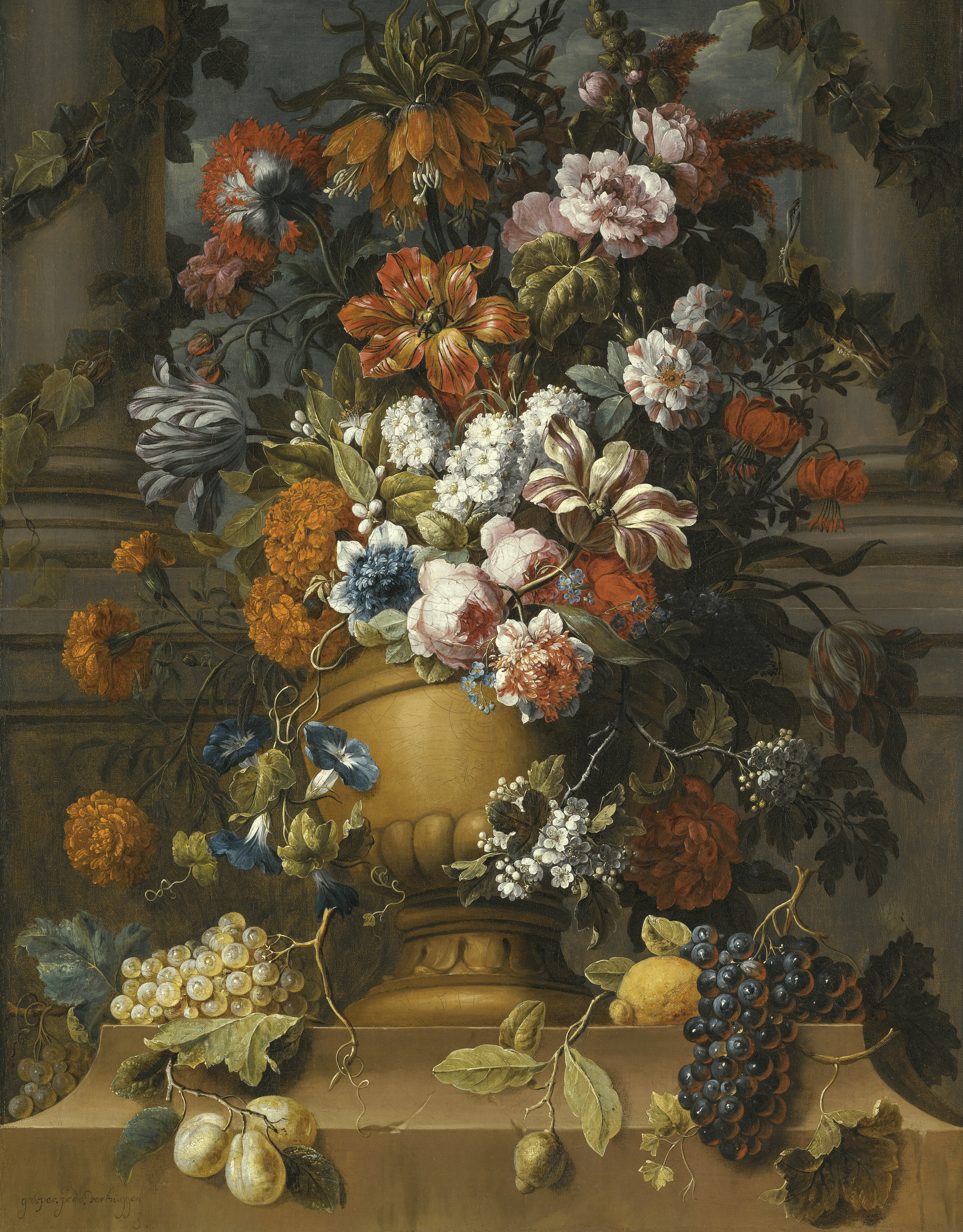
Flowers in an urn with fruit on a pedestal

Verbruggen was successful and lived in a house on the high-end Meir. He married on 22 June 1700 with Dymphna van der Voort. His wife died not long after the union and was buried on 18 September 1702. The artist lived above his means and was forced in 1703 to sell all his paintings. The revenue from the sale was not sufficient to cover all his debts.

He decided to leave Flanders for the Dutch Republic in 1705. He established himself in The Hague where he received many commissions for the decoration of prominent residences. He joined the Guild of Saint Luke of The Hague in 1708. Despite his commercial success his expenses remained higher than his income. He returned as a poor man to Antwerp. His old art friends arranged for him to take the job of 'knaap' (boy) at the Antwerp Guild of Saint Luke, a position he held from 1723 to the time of his death. He was buried on 14 March 1730 in Antwerp's Cathedral.

His pupils included his half-brother Balthasar Hyacinth Verbruggen (son of his father and his second wife Sara Catharina Raeps), Jacob Melchior van Herck (who was his brother-in-law, half-brother or step brother), Frans d'Olivero, Peter Frans Casteels and Gillis Vinck.

== Work ==
=== General ===
Verbruggen was a specialist still life painter. He practised many of the sub-genres of still life such as fruit still lifes, flower pieces and garland paintings.

In its use of broad, impasto brush strokes, the style of his work reflects developments initiated by Italian artists Mario Nuzzi and Michele Pace del Campidoglio. The work of the French painter Jean-Baptiste Monnoyer was also an influence. His works represent a development towards a more decorative style in late 17th century Flemish still life painting. He placed the flower bouquets in his compositions in large stone vases or arranged them in the form of garlands around these vases or garden ornaments. The vases were often placed in outdoor settings with figures. His style was followed by Jan Baptist Bosschaert, Simon Hardimé, Pieter Hardimé and Pieter Casteels III. His large vertical paintings with their tripartite division had an influence on Jan Baptist Bosschaert.

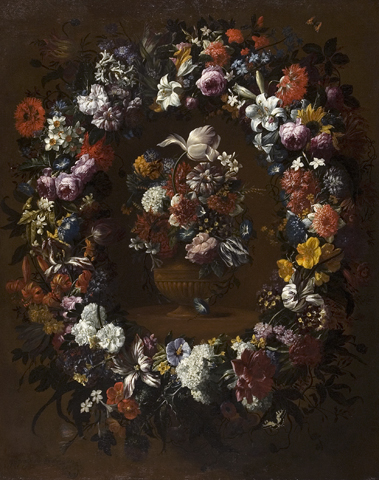
Flower garland surrounding a vase of flowers

=== Collaborations ===
Verbruggen collaborated with various specialist painters including the figure painters Peter Ykens and Jacob Leyssens in Antwerp and Matheus Terwesten in the Hague. The Antwerp painter Peeter-Frans Bailliu painted the vases, figures and grisailles in some of his compositions. The collaborators on his paintings have not always been identified with certainty. For instance, the collaborator in the painting Margaret Lemon as Erminia who painted the female figure after an original by Anthony van Dyck was believed to be Adriaen Hanneman but that attribution is no longer believed to be accurate.

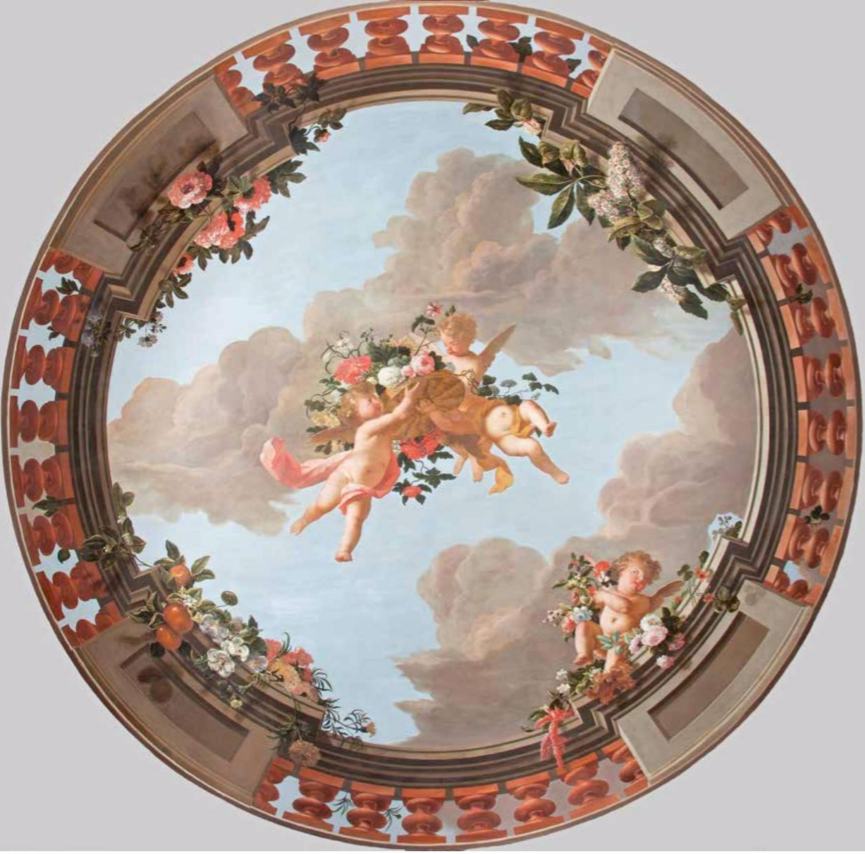
Ceiling painting with putti and flowers with Mattheus Terwesten

Verbruggen collaborated on a number of compositions in the genre of 'garland paintings'. Garland paintings are a type of still life invented in early 17th century Antwerp by Jan Brueghel the Elder and subsequently practised by leading Flemish still life painters, and in particular Daniel Seghers. Paintings in this genre typically show a flower or, less frequently, fruit garland around a devotional image or portrait. In the later development of the genre, the devotional image was replaced by other subjects such as portraits, mythological subjects and allegorical scenes.

Garland paintings were usually collaborations between a still life and a figure painter. Sometimes the still life painter would paint the garland and only much later another painter would add the figures or grisaille in the centre. The centre in some of the garland paintings that have been preserved were never filled by an image. The cartouche in the center of Verbruggen's garland paintings was usually filled with non-religious imagery such as portraits and mythological scenes. The Flower garland surrounding a vase of flowers (At the Instituut Collectie Nederland) is an example of a garland painting by Verbruggen. It is unusual because the image in the centre of the flower garland is a vase of flowers, rather than a scene with figures or a grisaille. X-ray investigation and archival research have revealed that originally there was a figure of a woman in the centre, which was painted over and replaced by the flower vase in the early 20th century. The painter of the flower vase selected flowers in the original flower garland as the basis for the flower bouquet thus creating a harmony between the garland and the flower bouquet.
