= Pieter Spierinckx =

Flemish painter and designer of tapestries

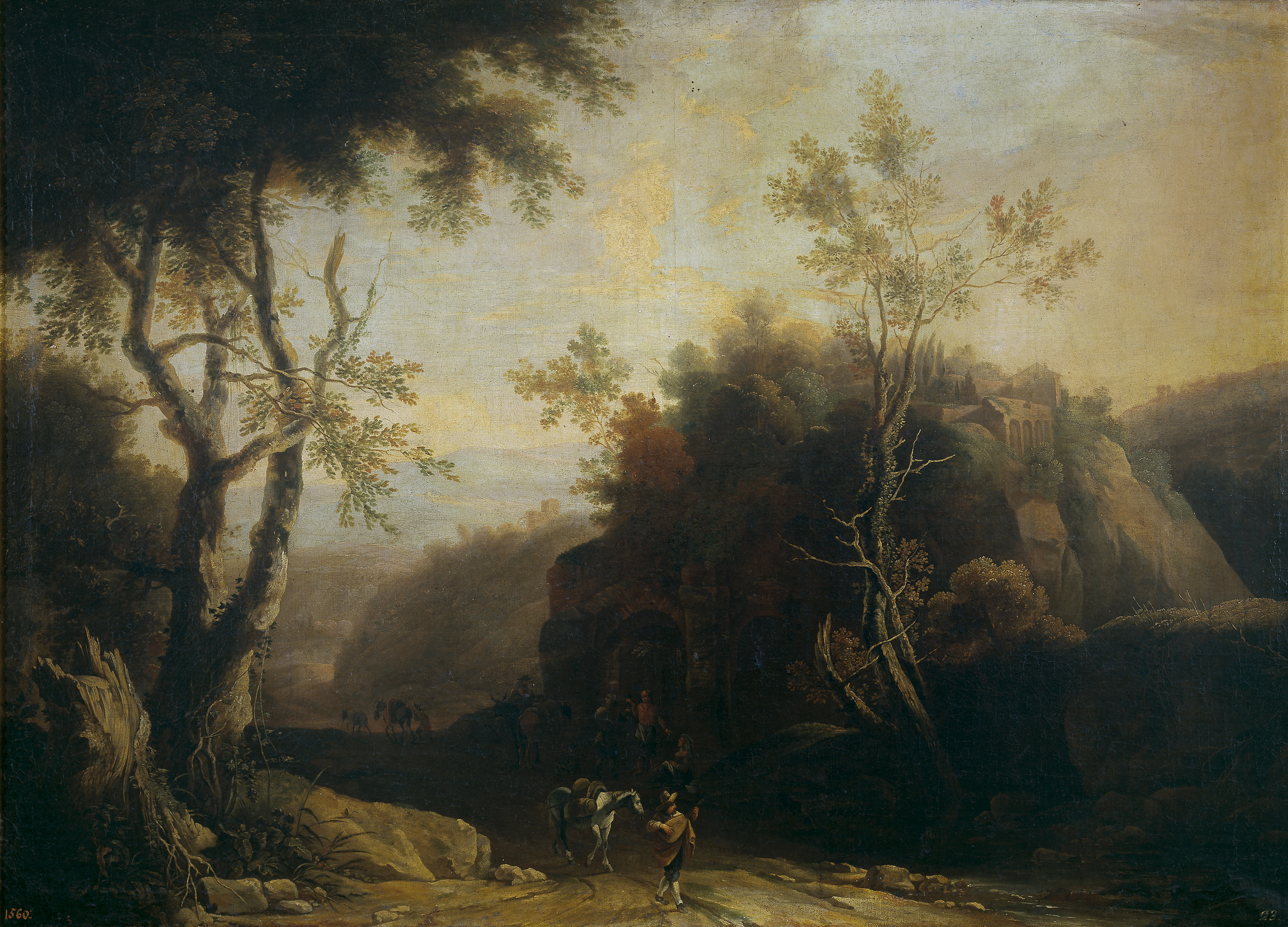
Landscape with tavern and Roman aqueduct

Pieter Spierincks or Pieter Nicolaes Spierinckx (30 August 1635, Antwerp – 30 August 1711, Antwerp or England) was a Flemish painter and designer of tapestries. He was an important representative of the Italianizing movement in Flemish landscape painting. He worked for prominent patrons including the kings of France and Spain.

== Life ==
Very little is known about the life and training of Pieter Spierincks. He became a master in the Antwerp Guild of Saint Luke in 1655. He was active in Antwerp in the period 1655–1660. Later he was in Italy, Lyon and Paris. In Paris he worked for the French king Louis XIV, for whom he painted landscapes. He was back in Antwerp in 1666. He was married to Jenne Marie de Jode, the daughter of the prominent engraver Gerard de Jode.

He likely died in Antwerp although it is possible that he died during a trip to England.

He was the teacher of Geeraert Cruys and Jean Carel van de Bruynel.

== Work ==
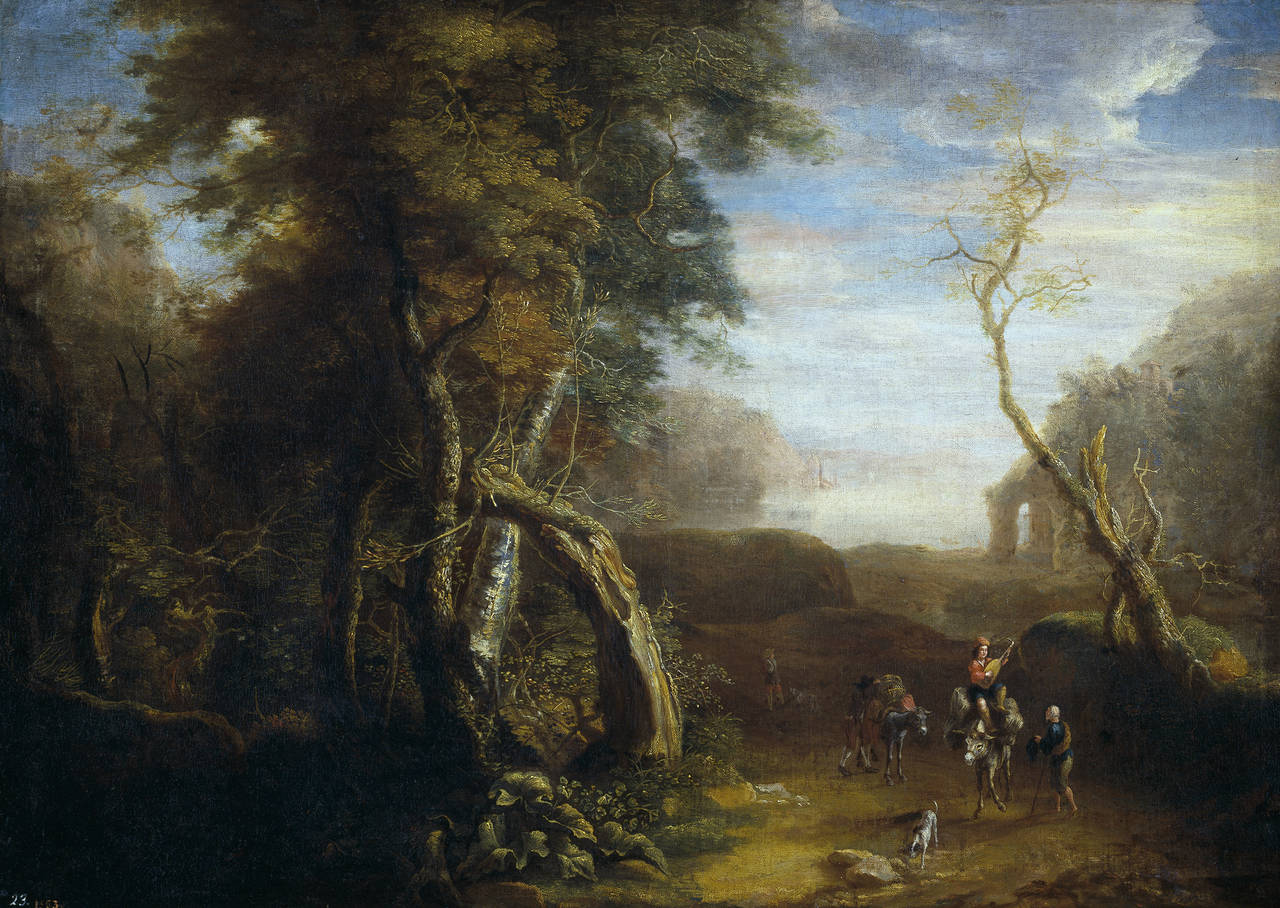
Italian landscape

Pieter Spierincks is known for his landscape paintings and the designs he made for the tapestry workshops in Brussels and Oudenaarde. The landscapes he painted for the French king are said to show the influence of Salvator Rosa. His landscapes were also influenced by Paul Bril. His Italianising landscapes further show similarity to the works of Claude Lorrain, particularly in the luminosity of his countryside scenes.

His Italianising style was very popular in his time and represents the decorative trend that arose in Flemish art in the middle of the 17th century. The staffage in his landscapes was regularly the work of specialist painters such as Peter Ykens.

The cartoons he made for the tapestry workshops were often a collaborative effort with other artists such as Lodewijk van Schoor and Peter Ykens.

Some hunting still lifes formerly attributed to him are likely the work of J.J. Spoede.

A pair of his landscape paintings are held by the Museo del Prado in Madrid. They were part of the Spanish royal collection.

== Notes ==
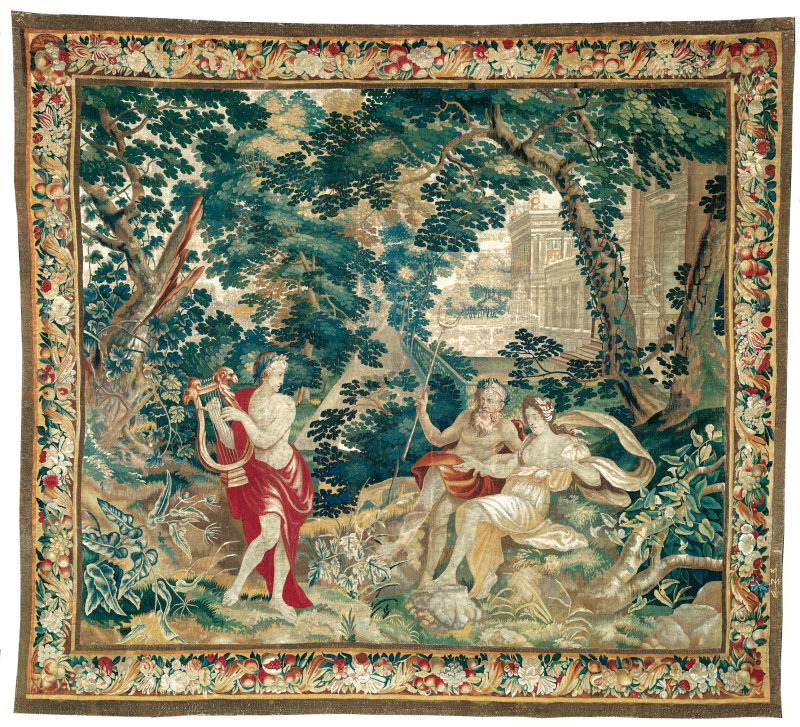
Orpheus playing the lyre to Hades and Persephone
