= Catarina Ykens (I) =

Flemish artist (1608–1666)

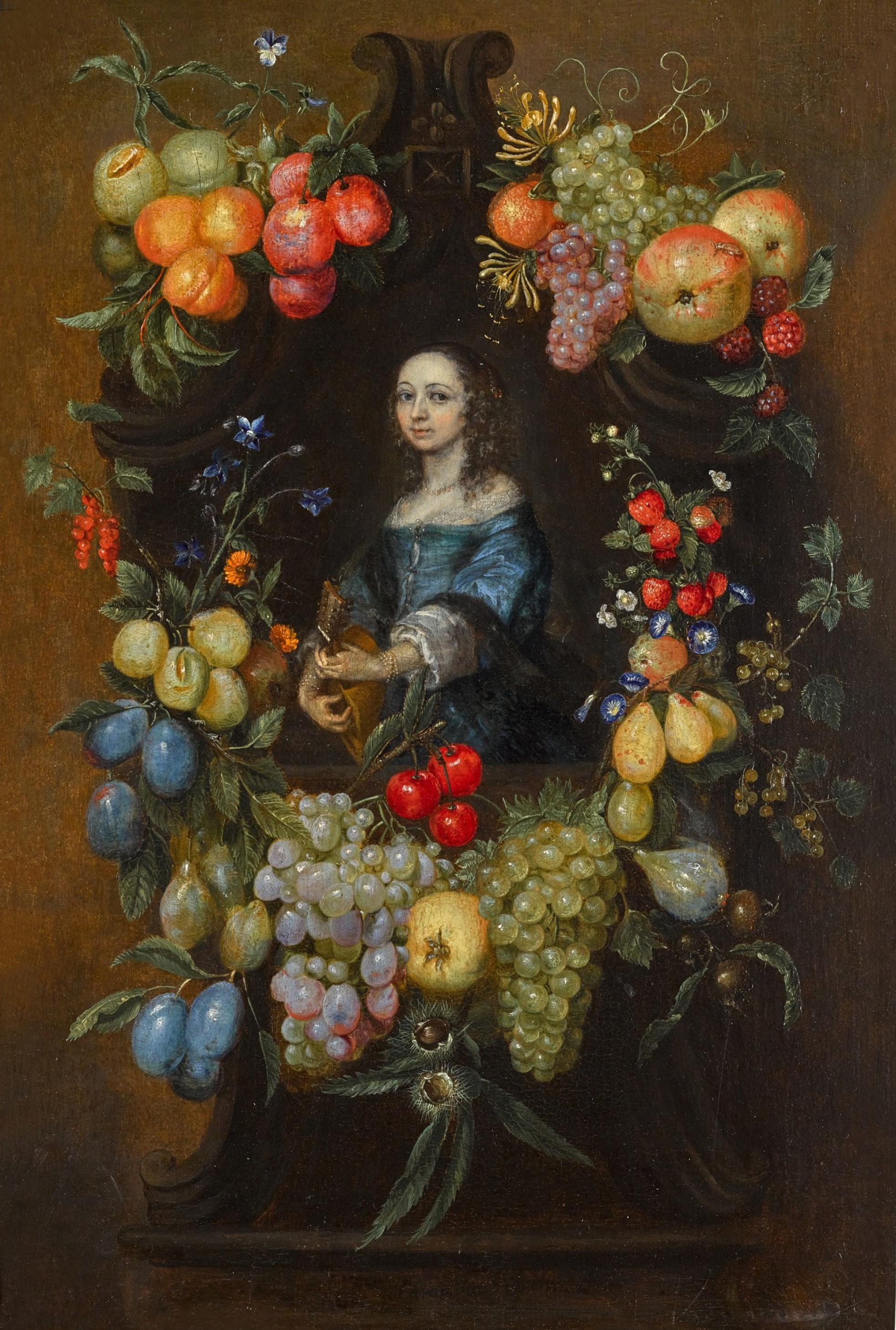
A garland of fruit and flowers surrounding a portrait of a lady in a blue dress, holding a guitar

Catarina Ykens or Catarina Ykens (I) (née Floquet) (1608/1618 – after 1666) was a Flemish still life painter. She is known for flower and fruit garland paintings and vanitas paintings.

== Life ==
She was born in Antwerp as the daughter of the history painter Lucas Floquet and Johanna Leeuwaerts. Her three brothers were also painters. She married in 1635 the prominent still life painter Frans Ykens with whom she had two sons. The relatively few works which may be firmly attributed to Catarina on account of their being signed, are close in style to those of her husband Frans Ykens.

== Work ==
She is known for fruit and flower still lifes, including flower and fruit garland paintings and vanitas paintings. Her works are sometimes confused with the works of another Antwerp painter of the same name, Catarina Ykens (II), born in 1659, who was the daughter of the painter Johannes Ykens and his second wife Barbara Brekevelt.

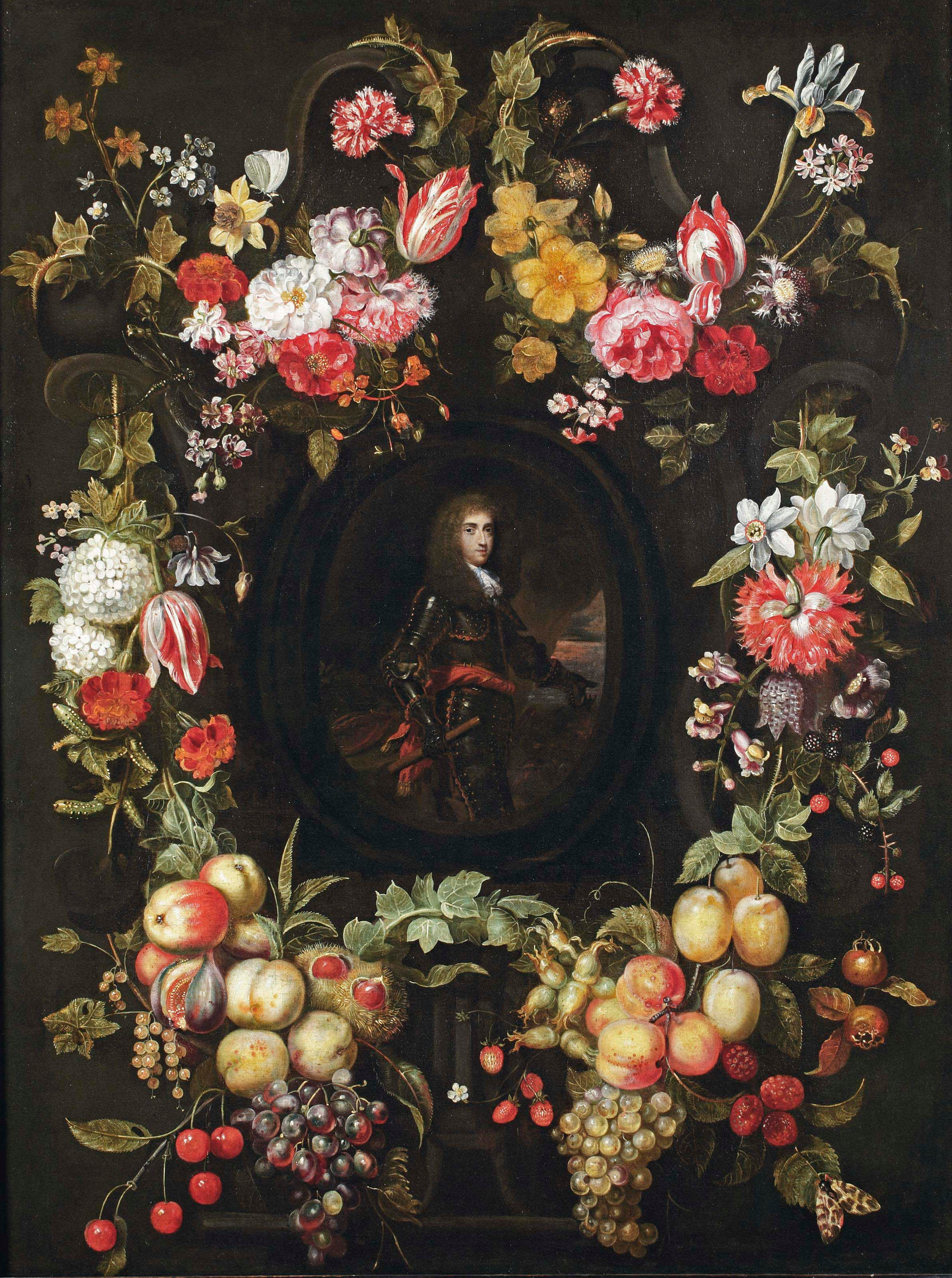
Garland painting with cavalry officer

The small numbers of works firmly attributed to her on account of their being signed, are close in style to those of her husband.

Like her husband Frans Ykens, she painted garland paintings. Garland paintings are a special type of still life developed in Antwerp by Jan Brueghel the Elder in collaboration with the Italian cardinal Federico Borromeo at the beginning of the 17th century. Other artists involved in the early development of the genre included Hendrick van Balen, Andries Daniels, Peter Paul Rubens and Daniel Seghers. The genre was initially connected to the visual imagery of the Catholic Counter-Reformation movement. It was further inspired by the cult of veneration and devotion to Mary prevalent at the Habsburg court (then the rulers over the Southern Netherlands) and in Antwerp generally.

Garland paintings typically show a flower garland around a devotional image, portrait or other religious symbol (such as the host). By the second half of the 17th century secular themes such as portraits and mythological subjects also decorated the central part of the many paintings made in this fashion. An example of such later development in garland paintings is Catarina's A garland of fruit and flowers surrounding a portrait of a lady in a blue dress, holding a guitar (Sotheby's London 27 May 2021 lot 37). The lady is likely not a self-portrait but appears to be a lady of some status, wearing a silk dress, with pearl necklace and bracelets. The figure has traditionally been attributed to Gonzales Coques (1614/18-84), a prominent portrait painter in the style of van Dyck. He is believed to have collaborated with a number of Antwerp painters on garland paintings but it is no clear whether he is the author of the lady inside the garland painting of Catarina Ykens.

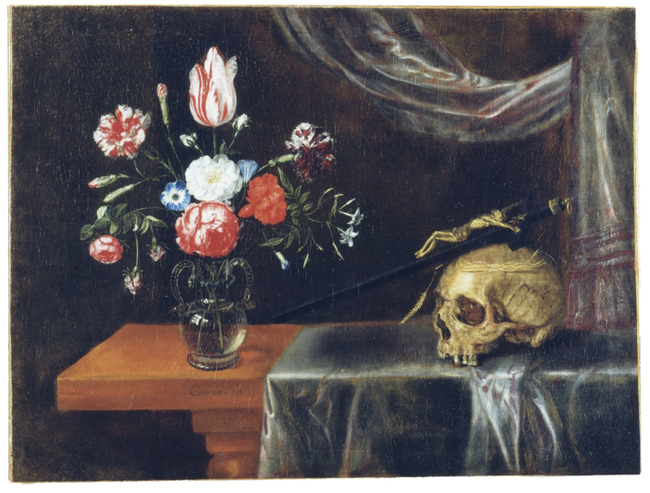
Still life of a vase of flowers, a skull and a crucifix

She is also known for a vanitas still life, a genre of still life which offers a reflection on the meaninglessness of earthly life and the transient nature of all earthly goods and pursuits. This meaning is conveyed in these still lifes through the use of stock symbols, which reference the transience of things and, in particular, the futility of earthly wealth: a skull, soap bubbles, candles, empty glasses, wilting flowers, insects, smoke, watches, mirrors, books, hourglasses and musical instruments, various expensive or exclusive objects such as jewellery and rare shells. The term vanitas is derived from the famous line 'Vanitas, Vanitas. Et omnia Vanitas', in the book of the Ecclesiastes in the bible, which in the King James Version is translated as "Vanity of vanities, all is vanity". The worldview behind the vanitas paintings was a Christian understanding of the world as a temporary place of fleeting pleasures and sorrows from which mankind could only escape through the sacrifice and resurrection of Christ. A wheat stalk symbolises, for instance, the resurrection of Christ on which, according to the Christian faith, the salvation of each human being depends. While most of these symbols reference earthly existence (books, scientific instruments, etc.) or the transience of life and death (skulls, soap bubbles) some symbols used in the vanitas paintings carry a dual meaning: the rose refers as much to the brevity of life as it is a symbol of the resurrection of Christ and thus eternal life. Catarina's composition Still life of a vase of flowers, a skull and a crucifix (At art dealer J.& M. Duputel, Paris on 3 June 2000) contains the typical symbols present in vanitas paintings: a skull, wilting flowers, a wheat stalk and a crucifix.
