= Tom Herck =

Belgian artist

Tom Herck, born in 1984 in Sint-Truiden, Belgium, is a multidisciplinary Belgian artist currently residing in Ordingen. Drawing inspiration from his experiences in the underground football culture, illegal graffiti scene, and extensive travels worldwide, Herck's artistic expressions challenge societal norms with a rebellious and unconventional nature.

== Life and work ==
At the core of Herck's artistic exploration are socio-political themes and existential inquiries. His art delves into the complexities of human existence, addressing themes such as vanity, history, religion, extinction, evolution, and the cyclical nature of history. Informed by personal experiences, family history, and exposure to outsider cultures, his creations serve as catalysts for cross-cultural dialogues. Religion, especially Christianity, plays a pivotal role in his life and art. His installations", such as "The Decline" and "Holy Cow," have stirred public discourse.

== Selected projects ==
Tom Herck is known for creating installations in public spaces, often taking on monumental forms. The 2016, "The Decline," garnered attention, resulting in protests and arrests, reflecting the impact of Herck's art on public discourse. Recently, Herck has taken his artistic projects abroad, including the "Eurovision" sailing art installation in London and the monumental 'The Wall' installation at the Burning Man festival in Nevada, USA.

== Publications ==
- Demystifying the Sacred: Blasphemy and Violence from the French Revolution to Today
