= Frans Ykens =

Flemish painter (1601–1693)

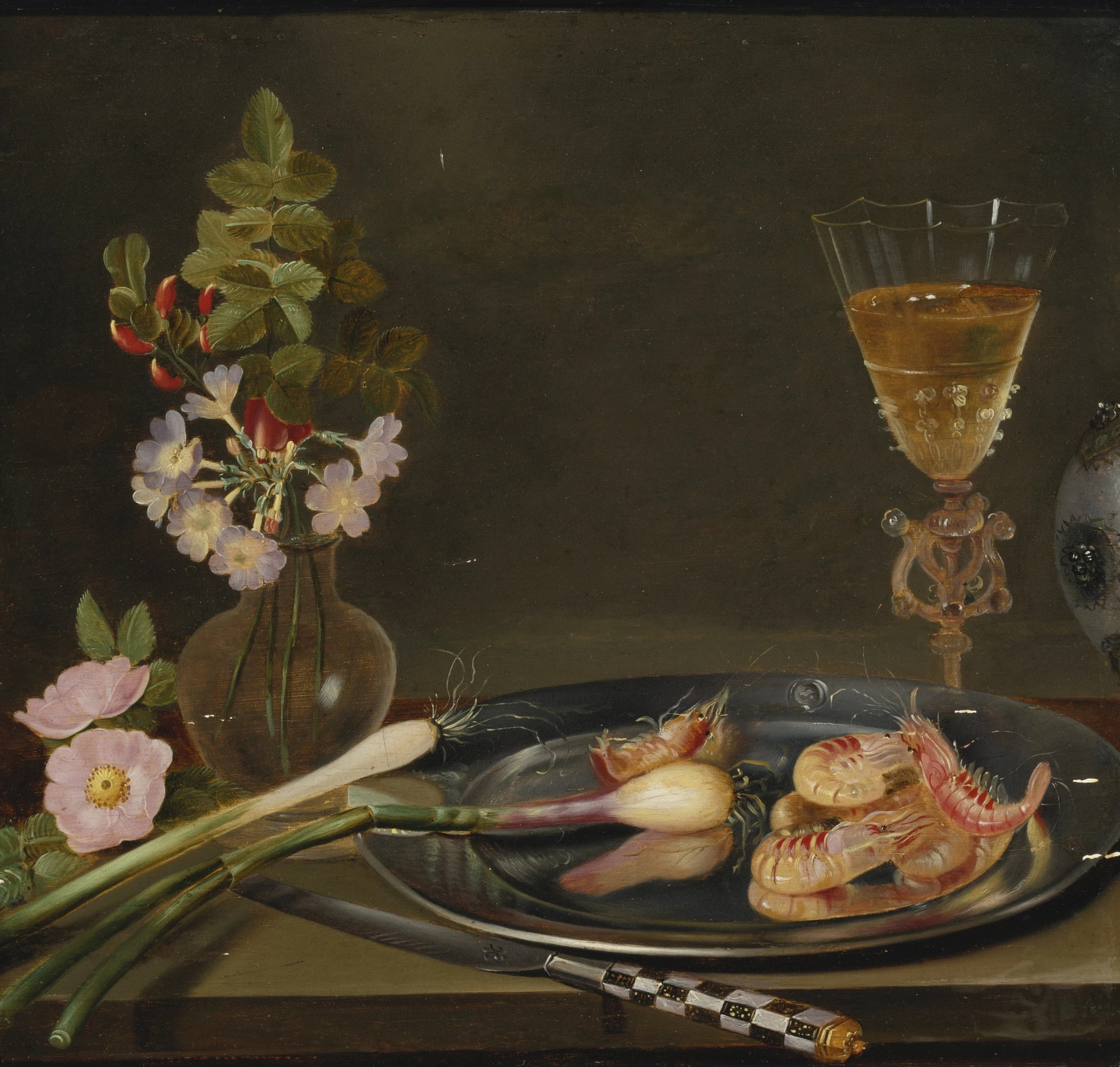
Still life with shrimp, ramps, flowers and a glass vase

Frans Ykens (1601, Antwerp – 1693, Brussels) was a Flemish still life painter active in Antwerp and Brussels in the 17th century. He is mainly known for his flower pieces and fruit still lifes and also painted banquet pieces, pronkstillevens, garland paintings and larger game pieces.

== Life ==
Frans Ykens was baptized on 17 April 1601 in the St Walburga Church in Antwerp. His parents were Frans Ykens I and Johanna Nys. He commenced his artistic study at age 14 with his uncle Osias Beert, the husband of his father's sister. Beert was one of the earliest painters to specialize in still lifes. In 1615 he also studied under his Lucas Floquet the Elder, a history painter, who later became his father-in-law. According to a statement he made in 1641, he had traveled 12 years earlier (i.e. in 1629) to the Provence where he stayed, amongst others, in Aix-en-Provence and Marseille.

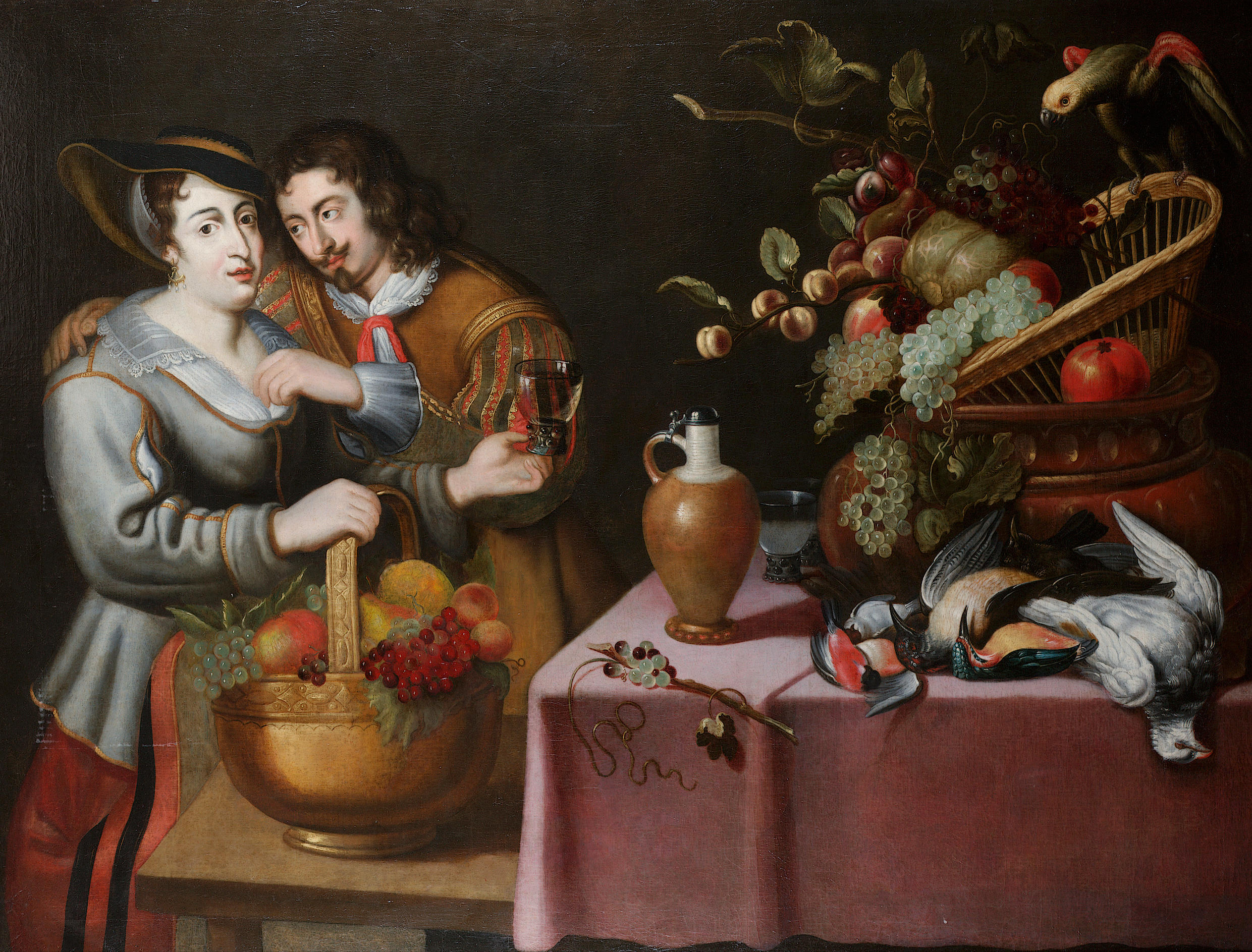
A gentleman courting a maid

Ykens became in 1631 a master of the Antwerp Guild of Saint Luke. In 1635 he married the flower painter Catarina Ykens (I), who was the daughter of history painter Lucas Floquet I and the sister of three painters.

Ykens was successful and his works were very popular with collectors of his time. He painted for Archduke Leopold in Brussels. His works were collected by Eleanor of Austria, Queen of Poland who purchased his work through Antwerp art dealers Forchondt. He was also very appreciated by his colleagues as is demonstrated by the fact that Rubens owned six of his still lifes.

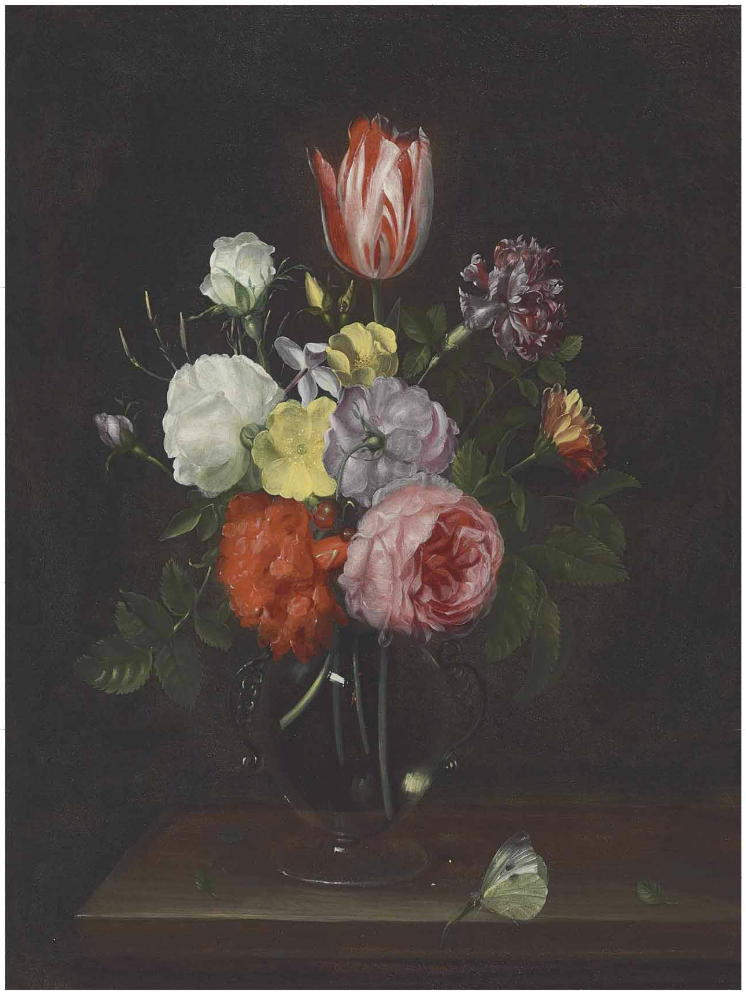
Bouquet of flowers in a glass vase, with a butterfly on a wooden tabletop

His success allowed him to acquire a sumptuous dwelling in central Antwerp. In 1665 he moved to Brussels, where he worked until his death. He must have fallen on hard times in his later years as he had to mortgage his property and his possessions were sold off after he died to pay his debts.

Ykens was the teacher of his niece Catarina Ykens (II), Osias Beert (II) and Gilliam Dandoy, who painted in his decorative style.

== Work ==
=== General ===
Frans Ykens' oeuvre is fairly well established as he signed most of his work. All his dated paintings date to his Antwerp years (from 1635 to 1663). He painted mainly flower pieces, garland paintings and fruit still lifes. In addition, he also created a number of breakfast pieces, pronkstillevens and larger pieces with game and dead fish.

Throughout his long career he worked in a number of styles and formats. He was influenced by the work of other still-life painters, including the "breakfast" pieces (ontbijtjes) of Willem Claesz Heda and the pronkstillevens or large sumptuous still lifes of Frans Snyders.

His bouquets of flowers in glass vases are in the manner of Daniel Seghers and Jan Philip van Thielen while his compositions with porcelain bowls of fruit are indebted to the pioneers of this genre, Osias Beert and Jacob van Hulsdonck.

=== Garland paintings ===
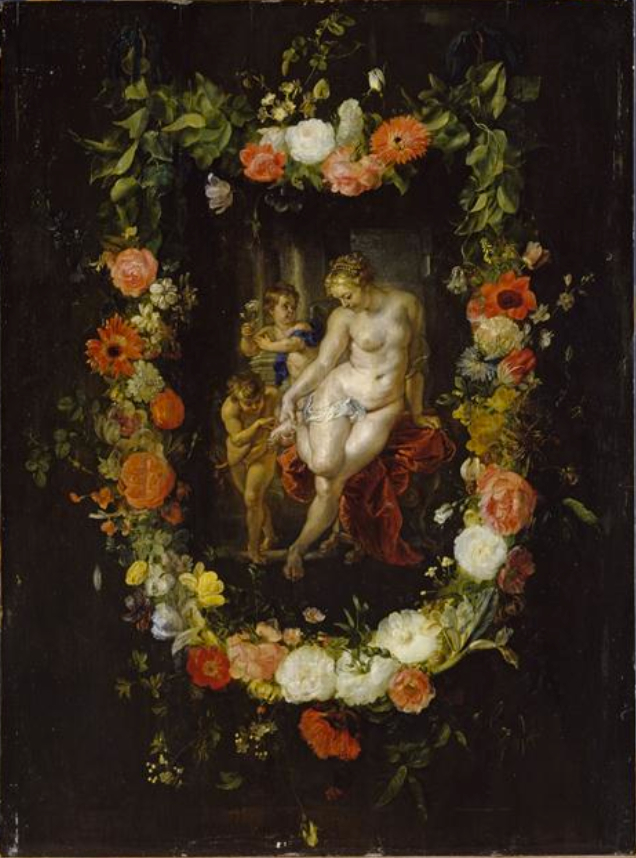
Birth of the red rose

Frans Ykens painted multiple devotional garland paintings. Garland paintings are a special type of still life developed in Antwerp by Jan Brueghel the Elder in collaboration with the Italian cardinal Federico Borromeo at the beginning of the 17th century. Other artists involved in the early development of the genre included Hendrick van Balen, Andries Daniels, Peter Paul Rubens and Daniel Seghers. The genre was initially connected to the visual imagery of the Counter-Reformation movement. It was further inspired by the cult of veneration and devotion to Mary prevalent at the Habsburg court (then the rulers over the Southern Netherlands) and in Antwerp generally.

Garland paintings typically show a flower garland around a devotional image, portrait or other religious symbol (such as the host). By the second half of the 17th century secular themes such as portraits and mythological subjects also decorated the central part of the many paintings made in this fashion. An example of such later development in garland paintings is the Birth of the red rose (Staatliches Museum Schwerin), a collaboration between Ykens and Cornelis Schut.

Other figure painters with whom Ykens is known to have collaborated on garland paintings include Jacob Jordaens, Erasmus Quellinus the Younger, Jan van den Hoecke, Pieter de Grebber, Thomas Willeboirts Bosschaert and Pieter van Avont. He probably also collaborated with Peter Paul Rubens. Ykens would paint the flowers and garlands while the other artists painted the remainder of the painting. Unlike other flower painters Frans Ykens would regularly paint the central theme in the garland painting himself.
