= Gaspar Peeter Verbruggen the Elder =

Flemish painter (1635–1681)

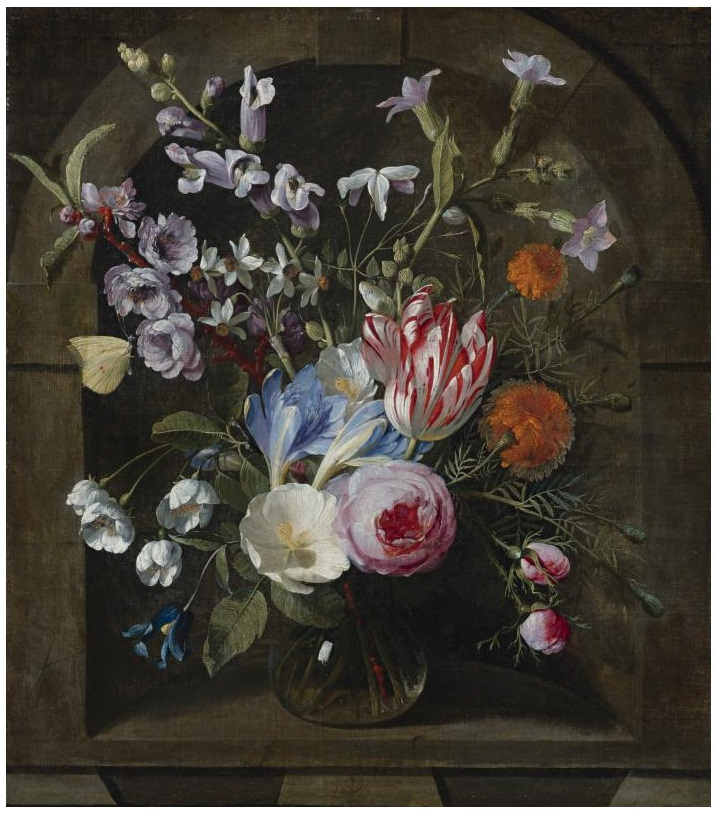
Flower still life in a niche

Gaspar Peeter Verbruggen the Elder (Antwerp, 1635 – Antwerp, 16 April 1681) was a Flemish painter of flowers and garland paintings.

== Life ==
Gaspar Peeter Verbruggen the Elder was baptized in the St. James' Church in Antwerp on 8 September 1635. His father, also called Gaspar or Kasper, was a gardener who owned a house and a large garden where he grew herbs and flowers. This may explain the young Gaspar's interest in flower painting. Gaspar was registered at the Antwerp Guild of Saint Luke as a pupil of the painter Cornelis Mahu in the guild year 1644–45. Five years later he was registered as a master of the Guild.

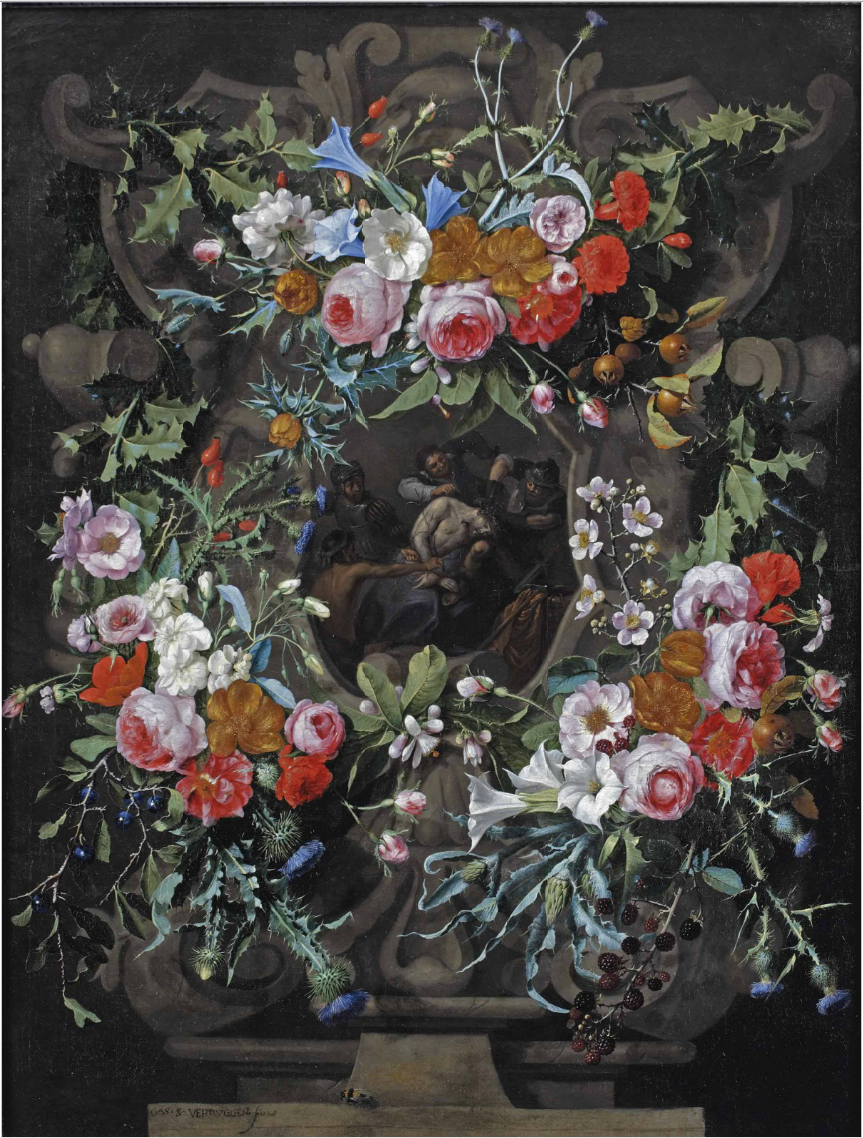
Mocking of Christ in a sculpted cartouche with a garland of holly, thistles, morning glory and other flowers on a stone ledge

He married Catharina van Zeverdonck on 17 February 1658 with whom he had 11 children. After the death of his wife on 24 August 1674 he married Sara Catharina Raeps on 13 June 1697. At the time of his death on 16 April 1681 there were still six minor children alive: Anna Catharina, Marie Isabella, Gaspar Peeter, Maria Magdalena, Petronella and (from the second marriage) Balthasar Hyacint. Gaspar and Balthasar Hyacint became still life painters. He was a successful artist as demonstrated by the fact that his estate included six houses and valuable household effects.

His pupils were his oldest son Gaspar Peeter, Gillis Vinck the younger, Joris Carpentero, Norbertus Beeckmans, Norbertus Martini and Jacobus Seldenslach.

== Work ==
Gaspar Peeter Verbruggen the Elder was known for his flower still lifes and garland paintings. His flower still lifes date from 1654 to 1680.

An important portion of Verbruggen's output falls into the category of 'garland paintings'. Garland paintings are a type of still life invented in early 17th century Antwerp by Jan Brueghel the Elder and subsequently practised by leading Flemish still life painters, and in particular Daniel Seghers. Paintings in this genre typically show a flower or, less frequently, fruit garland around a devotional image or portrait. In the later development of the genre, the devotional image is replaced by other subjects such as portraits, mythological subjects and allegorical scenes.

Garland paintings were usually collaborations between a still life and a figure painter. Verbruggen's collaborators on his garland paintings have not been identified but it is believed they included Peter Ykens and Jacobus Ferdinandus Saey. His collaborators painted the figure or figures inside the cartouche while Verbruggen painted the flower garland.
