= Johannes Ykens =

Flemish Baroque painter and wood sculptor

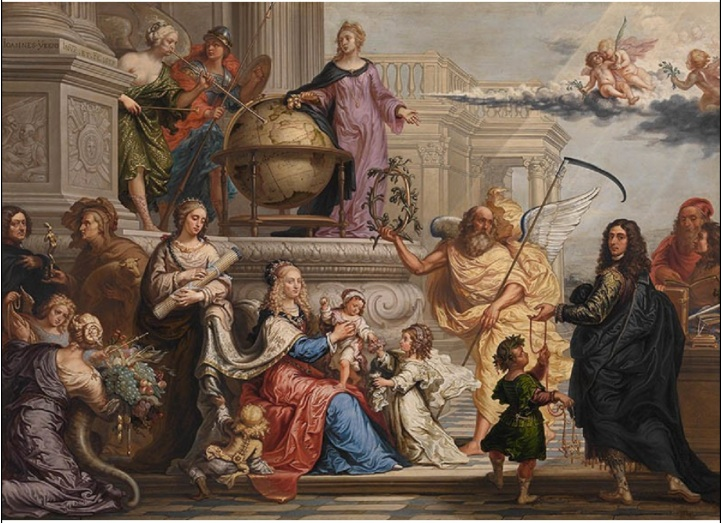
Allegorical celebration of the birth of a prince

Johannes Ykens (Antwerp, 19 December 1613 – after 1680), was a Flemish Baroque painter and wood sculptor. He is known for his Christian religious scene, history paintings and portraits and his sculptures for churches.

== Life ==
Johannes Ykens was the son of sculptor Melchior Ykens. He initially studied sculpture with his father and remained as an assistant in his father studio. He became a member of the Antwerp Guild of St. Luke in 1639 as wijnmeester, meaning he was the son of a member.

He married first with Livina Laureyssens on 11 August 1641. When his wife died in October 1644, he remarried with Barbara van Brekevelt on 13 January 1646. He had three children with his second wife: Catarina Ykens (II) (baptized on 24 February 1659) and Peter Ykens (baptised on 30 January 1648) who both became painters.

It is only after his second marriage that Ykens started to dedicate himself to painting, likely under the guidance of his friend, the genre painter David Ryckaert III. He did, however, not abandon sculpting. Despite his artistic activities, he seemed to struggle to make a living.

His pupils besides his children were the sculptor Flups Tallaert, (1640–41), Lamberecht la Fosse (1641–42), Peeter van Opbergen (1645–46), and Jan-Battista van Neckens (1665–66).

The death date and place of the artist are not known. His last dated painting is dated 1680 and therefore his death must have occurred in that year or thereafter.

== Work ==
Ykens was as a painter known for his Christian religious scene, history paintings and portraits. He sculpted church decoration and furniture such as pulpits. Only a few of his works have been preserved.

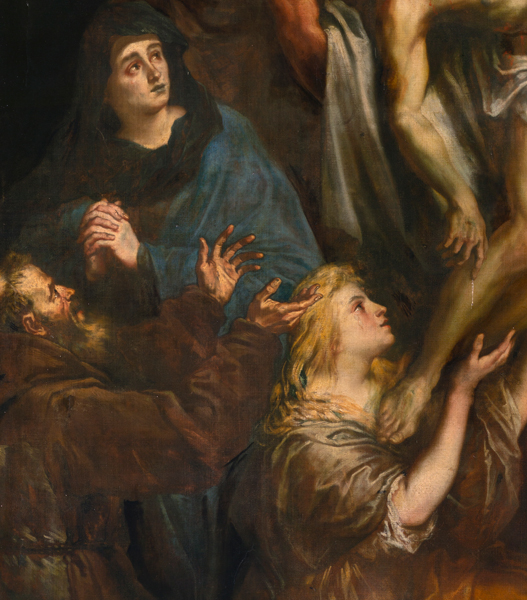

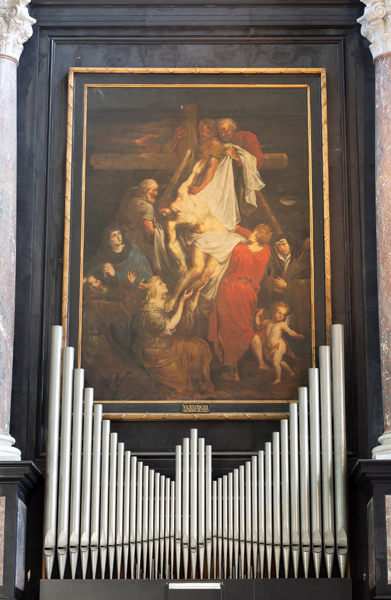
Descent from the Cross, Saint Martin's Church (Kortrijk)

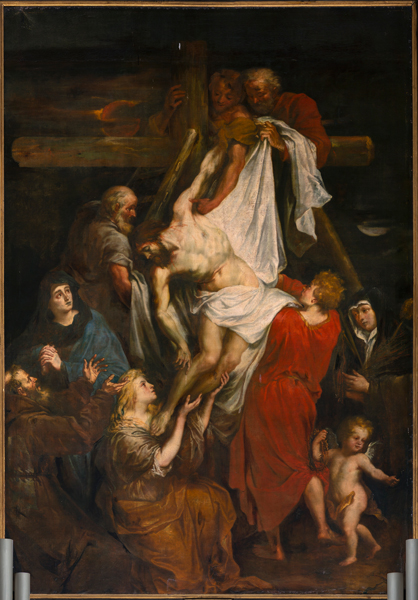
