= Catarina Ykens (II) =

Flemish artist (1659–1737)

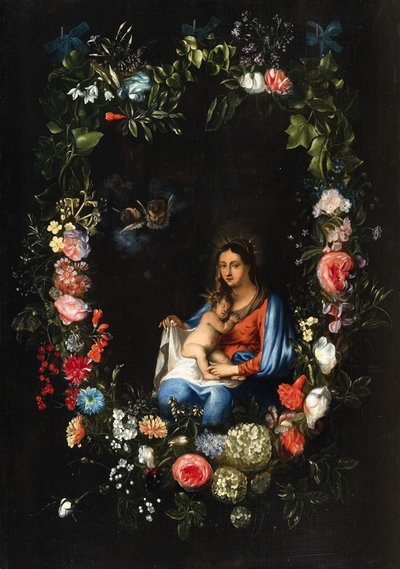
The Virgin and Child in a Floral Wreath

Catarina or Catharina Ykens, or Catarina Ykens (II) (1659–1737 or later), was a Flemish painter. The few surviving paintings attributed to her are still lifes but she is also believed to have painted history paintings with biblical themes.

== Life ==
She was born in Antwerp as the daughter of the painter Johannes Ykens and his second wife Barbara Brekevelt and was baptized on 24 February 1659. She was the sister of Peter Ykens, a history and portrait painter. She apprenticed under her father and became a master in the Antwerp Guild of Saint Luke in the guild year 1687–1688.

The record of the Guild mentions that she was a geestelycke dochter (spiritual daughter), a term which refers to an unmarried Catholic woman who took a vow of chastity before a priest, usually obeying, not bound by vows, a superior, also known as her confessor.

It is not clear when she died. A Nativity in Aix-en-Provence is signed and dated 1737. This is her latest known dated work.

== Work ==
=== General ===
She is known for her flower garland paintings, vanitas still lifes as well as history paintings with biblical themes. The few surviving paintings attributed to her are still lifes. Her works are sometimes confused with the works of another Antwerp painter of the same name known as Catarina Ykens (I) (née Floquet), born between 1608 and 1618 in Antwerp, who was the wife of the still life painter Frans Ykens.

=== Garland paintings ===
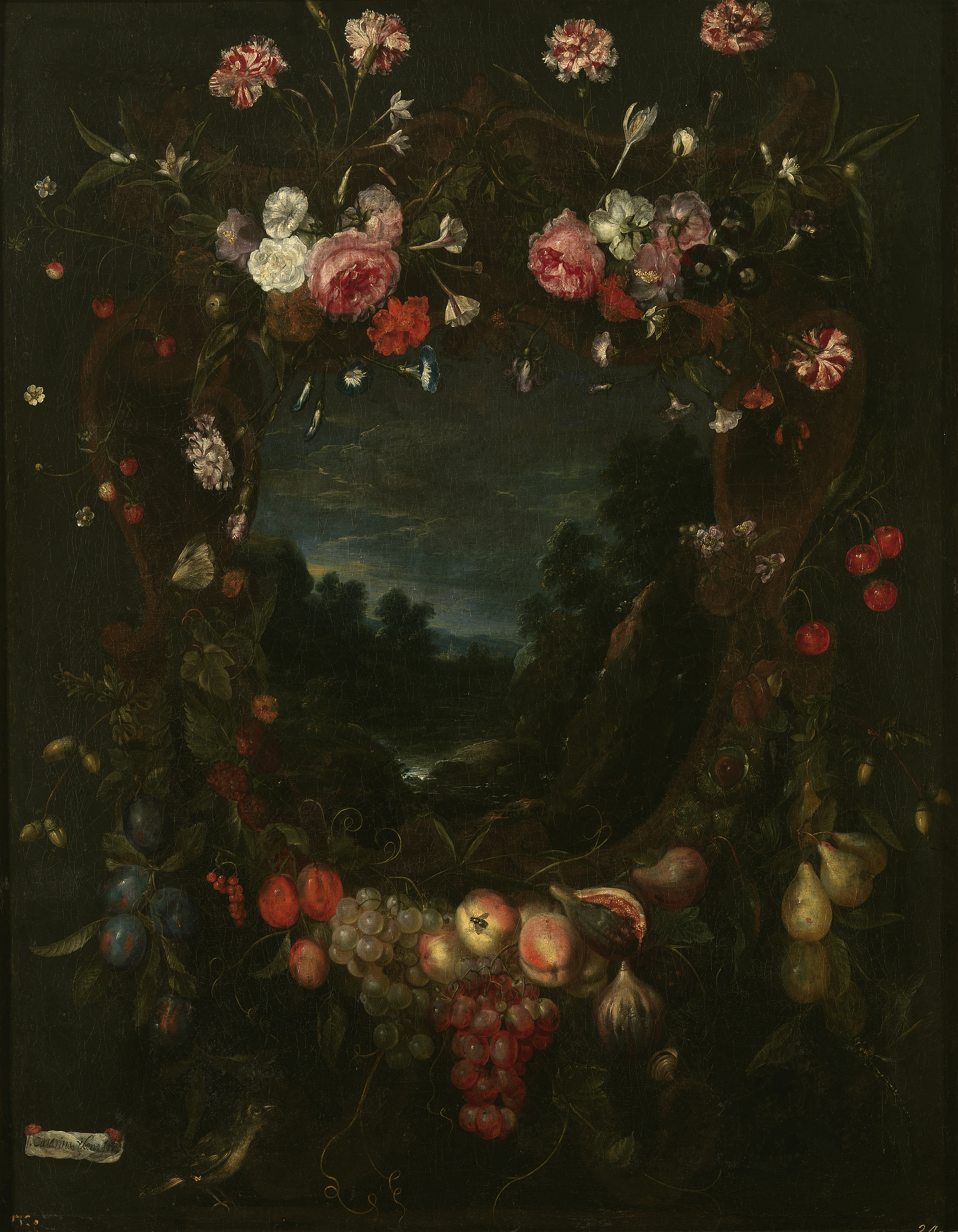
Flower garland with landscape

She painted garland paintings. Garland paintings are a special type of still life developed in Antwerp by Jan Brueghel the Elder in collaboration with the Italian cardinal Federico Borromeo at the beginning of the 17th century. Other artists involved in the early development of the genre included Hendrick van Balen, Andries Daniels, Peter Paul Rubens and Daniel Seghers. The genre was initially connected to the visual imagery of the Catholic Counter-Reformation movement. It was further inspired by the cult of veneration and devotion to Mary prevalent at the Habsburg court (then the rulers over the Habsburg Netherlands) and in Antwerp generally.

Garland paintings typically show a flower garland around a devotional image, portrait or other religious symbol (such as the host). By the second half of the 17th century secular themes such as portraits and mythological subjects also decorated the central part of the many paintings made in this fashion. Two examples of such later development are two signed garland paintings by Catarina Ykens in the Museo del Prado, Madrid: the Flower garland with landscape and the Landscape inside a garland. These works are usually attributed to Catarina (II) but may also have been painted by Catarina (I). The two compositions depict a garland of flowers and leaves surrounding a landscape. In each of these works, the landscape was not painted by Catherine Ykens herself, but the identity of their author(s) is not known.

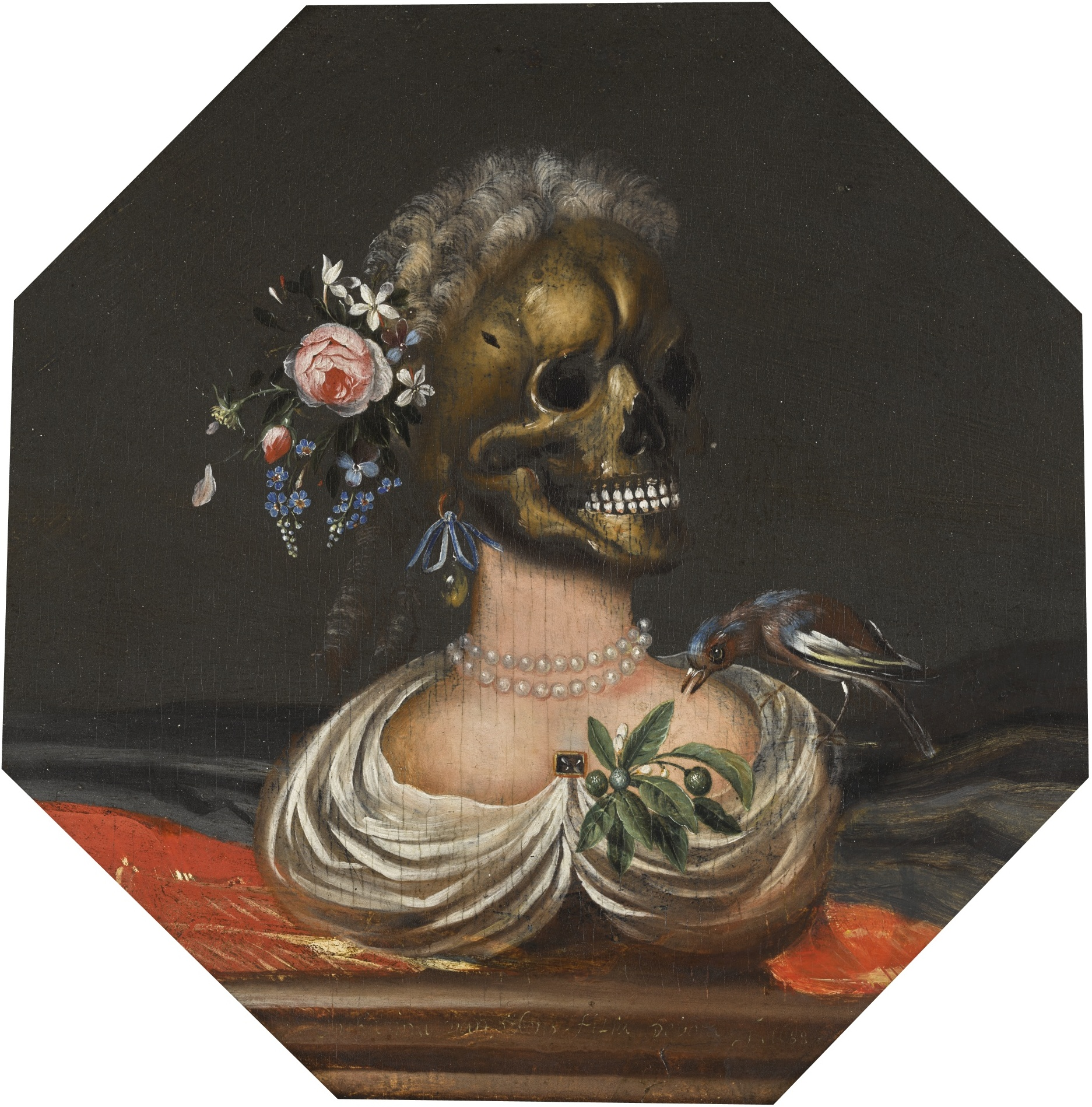
Vanitas bust of a lady with a crown of flowers on a ledge

=== Vanitas paintings ===
She is also known for a vanitas still life, a genre of still life which offers a reflection on the meaninglessness of earthly life and the transient nature of all earthly goods and pursuits. This meaning is conveyed in these still lifes through the use of stock symbols, which reference the transience of things and, in particular, the futility of earthly wealth: a skull, soap bubbles, candles, empty glasses, wilting flowers, insects, smoke, watches, mirrors, books, hourglasses and musical instruments, various expensive or exclusive objects such as jewellery and rare shells. The term vanitas is derived from the famous line 'Vanitas, Vanitas. Et omnia Vanitas', in the book of the Ecclesiastes in the bible, which in the King James Version is translated as "Vanity of vanities, all is vanity".

The worldview behind vanitas paintings was a Christian understanding of the world as a temporary place of fleeting pleasures and sorrows from which mankind could only escape through the sacrifice and resurrection of Christ. A wheat stalk symbolises, for instance, the resurrection of Christ on which, according to the Christian faith, the salvation of each human being depends. While most of these symbols reference earthly existence (books, scientific instruments, etc.) or the transience of life and death (skulls, soap bubbles) some symbols used in the vanitas paintings carry a dual meaning: the rose refers as much to the brevity of life as it is a symbol of the resurrection of Christ and thus eternal life. Catarina's composition Vanitas bust of a lady with a crown of flowers on a ledge (signed and dated on the ledge: Catharina van ÿkens . filia Devota f. 1688, at Sotheby's London of 6 July 2017, lot 115) contains the typical symbols present in vanitas paintings such as a skull and wilting flowers, but has a distinctive macabre aspect by putting the skull crowned with a wig on a bust and having a bird pick at some berries on a branch pinned to the front of the bust.
