= Casteels =

Casteels is a surname. Notable people with the surname include:

- Alexander Casteels the Elder (c. 1635-1733), Flemish painter
- Alexander Casteels the Younger (fl 1687–1716), Flemish painter
- Eddy Casteels (born 1960), Belgian basketball coach
- Gonzales Franciscus Casteels (?– after 1709), Flemish painter
- Koen Casteels (born 1992), Belgian football player
- Peter Frans Casteels (fl. 1673–1700), Flemish painter
- Pauwels Casteels (c. 1625– after 1677), Flemish painter
- Pieter Casteels II (fl. 1673–1701), Flemish painter
- Pieter Casteels III (1684–1749), Flemish painter

== See also ==
- Casteel (surname)
