= Casteel (surname) =

Casteel is a surname. Notable people with the surname include:

- David Casteel, American politician
- Frank Casteel (1948–2019), American murderer
- Heaven Casteel, fictional character in V. C. Andrews novels
- Homer Casteel (1879–1958), American politician
- Homer Casteel Jr. (1919–1972), American painter, sculptor, writer and teacher
- Jeff Casteel (born 1962), American football coach
- Jordan Casteel (born 1989), American painter
- Joshua Casteel (1979–2012), American soldier, conscientious objector, and playwright
- Lauren Young Casteel (born 1953), American civil rights activist
- Miles W. Casteel (1895–1977), American football coach
- Ryan Casteel (born 1991), American baseball player
- Seth Casteel, American photographer

== See also ==
- Casteels, another surname
