= Pieter Casteels =

Pieter or Peter Casteels may refer to:

- Pieter Casteels III (1684–1749), Flemish painter and engraver
- Pieter Casteels II (fl. 1673–1700), Flemish painter
- Peter Frans Casteels (fl. 1673–1700), Flemish painter
