= Pieter Hardimé =

Flemish painter

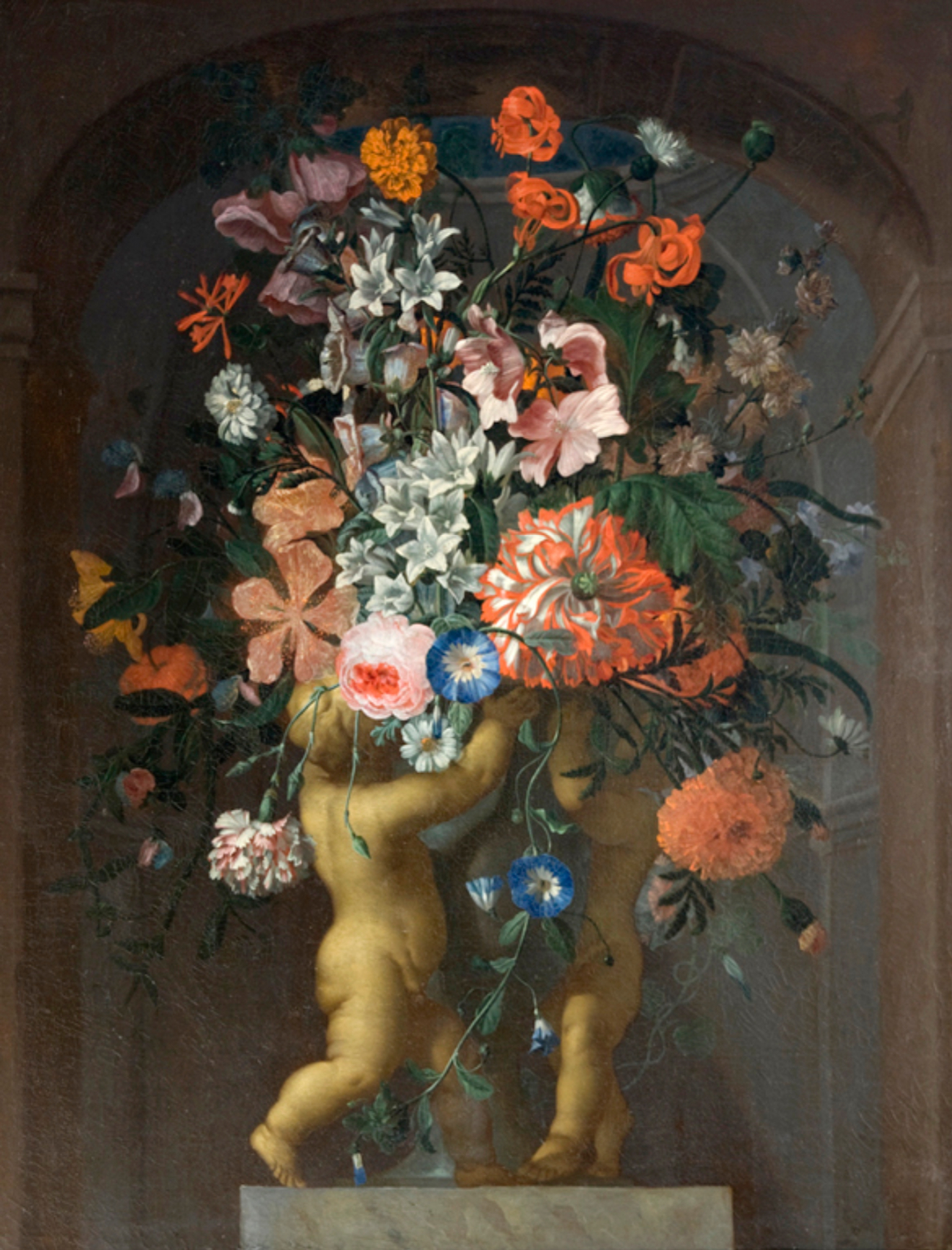
Still life of flowers with putti, with Mattheus Terwesten

Pieter Hardimé (25 November 1677, in Antwerp – September 1748, in The Hague) was a Flemish painter known for his paintings of flowers. He trained in Antwerp and later moved to the Dutch Republic where he worked in The Hague. He was active as a decorative painter of flowers for wall and ceiling decorations, often in collaboration with Mattheus Terwesten.

== Life ==
Hardimé was born in Antwerp as the son of Simon, a laborer originally from the French-speaking part of the Southern Netherlands, and a Flemish mother. He trained with his older brother Simon Hardimé who was a flower painter. Simon was himself a pupil of Jan Baptist de Crépu, a flower and fruit painter active in Antwerp. De Crépu was originally an officer in the Spanish service who had only become a painter later in life when he settled in Antwerp where he was celebrated as a flower painter.

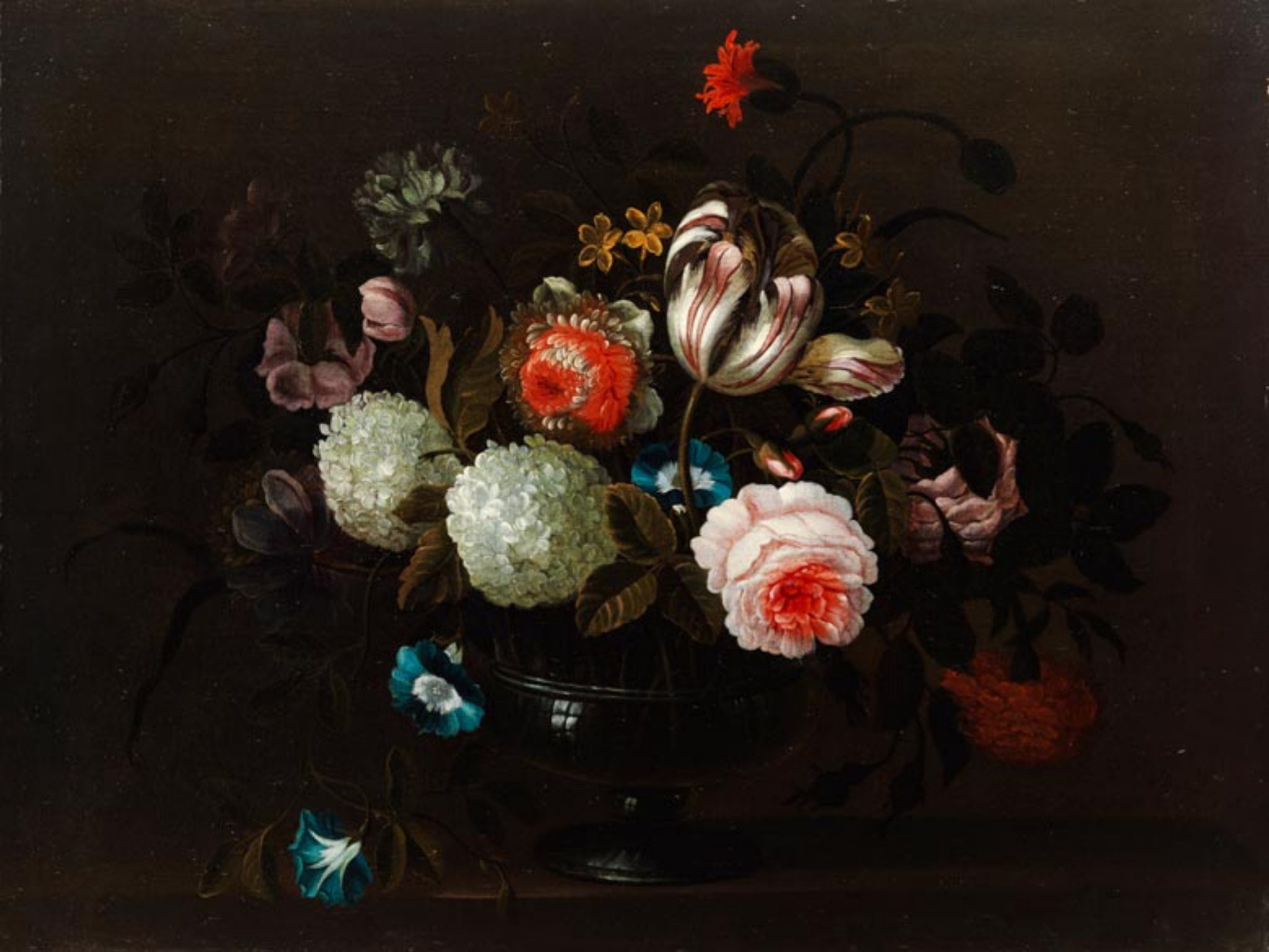
Still life of flowers in a glass vase

Pieter Hardimé never registered as a master in the Antwerp Guild of Saint Luke. Instead he moved in 1697 to The Hague where he remained active for the rest of his life. By moving to the Dutch Republic Pieter followed in the footsteps of many of his fellow Antwerp artists who left their home country which was affected by frequent attacks and invasions by French troops.

His brother Simon joined him in The Hague from 1697, allegedly to escape his creditors in Antwerp. Simon later moved to Breda where he received a commission to paint a chimney piece for the palace of William III of England. Pieter joined in 1700 the Confrerie Pictura, a more or less academic society of artists founded in 1656 in The Hague. He received commissions from Baron van Smettau, the ambassador of the Prussian King Frederick I of Prussia. He painted many flower pieces for Huis Honselaarsdijk, the Prussian King's country house in the Dutch Republic. These works were so appreciated by the king that they were later shipped to his palace in Prussia. He had other prominent patrons including the mayor of Rotterdam Willem van Hogendorp and his brother the treasurer for whom he made decorative paintings for their residences.

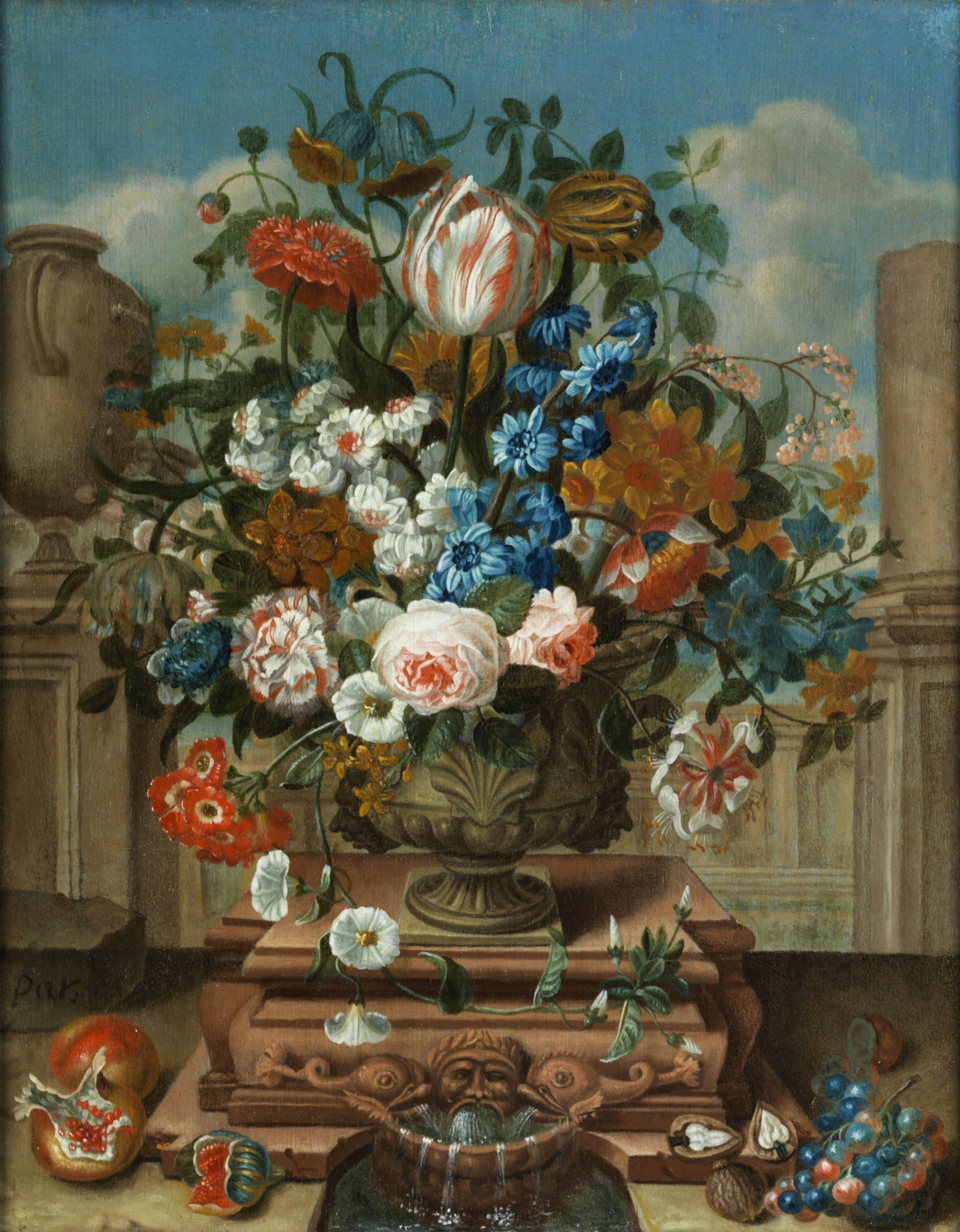
Large flower still life

Hardimé married in 1707 Adriana Lens, sister of at prelate at the St. Bernard's Abbey in Hemiksem near Antwerp. He also received commissions from the Abbey for four large flower paintings representing the four seasons. After the Flemish painter Gaspar Peeter Verbruggen the Younger left The Hague, Hardimé became the favourite collaborator of the decorative painter Mattheus Terwesten. The artists often worked together on decorations of residences in The Hague. The count of Wassenaar was one of his patrons and commissioned him to make decorative paintings in his palatial home in Voorhout. After the death of his first wife with whom he had three children, he contracted a second marriage with a Miss Bruinestein, with whom he had no children. He is said to have become melancholic towards the end of his career as a result of a drop in demand for his fruit and flower pieces and decorative paintings.

He died in The Hague where his death was recorded on in September 1748.

== Works ==
Hardimé was a painter of still lives with flowers. These works were often chimney and doorway pieces which were placed over mantelpieces or door mantels as decoration.

Flemish still life painting at the end of the 17th century showed a preference for decorative effect over naturalistic representation. The trend was initiated by contemporary Flemish artists Jan Baptist Bosschaert and Gaspar Peeter Verbruggen the Younger and was also followed by Pieter's brother Simon as well as Pieter Casteels III. Hardimé created many works showing flower bouquets in large stone vases or arranged in the form of garlands around vases or garden ornaments. The vases were often depicted in outdoor settings with figures. After Mattheus Terwesten's regular collaborator Gaspar Peeter Verbruggen the Younger left The Hague in 1732, Pieter Hardimé and Terwesten worked together on decorative projects catering to the taste of the wealthy citizens of The Hague.
