= Simon Hardimé =

Flemish painter

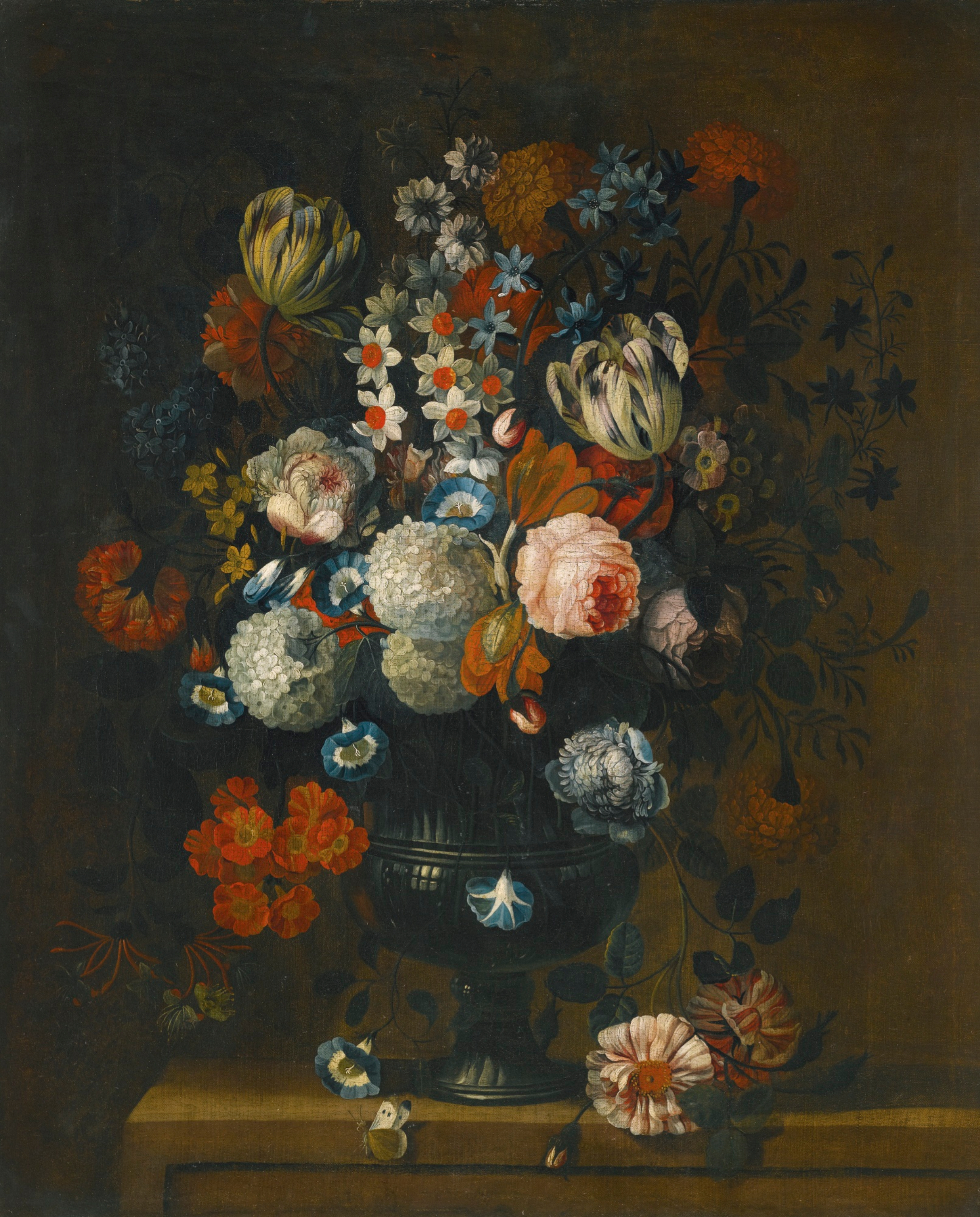
Still life of roses, variegated tulips and other flowers in a sculpted vase

Simon Hardimé (1672–1737) was a Flemish painter of mixed Walloon and Flemish descent. He is known for his paintings of flowers. He trained in Antwerp and later worked for a few years in the Dutch Republic. He then moved to London where he remained the rest of his life. His patrons included the bourgeoisie in Brussels and Antwerp and aristocrats in the Netherlands and England.

== Life ==
Hardimé was born in Antwerp as the son of a laborer with the same name, who was originally from Liège, and a Flemish mother. He became in 1684 a pupil of Jan Baptist de Crépu, a flower and fruit painter who was also of Walloon descent. De Crépu was originally an officer in the Spanish service who had only become a painter later in life when he settled in Antwerp. De Crépu later fled his creditors and moved to Brussels where he died in 1689. Another pupil of de Crépu who studied at the same time as Hardimé was the still life painter Jan Baptist Bosschaert.

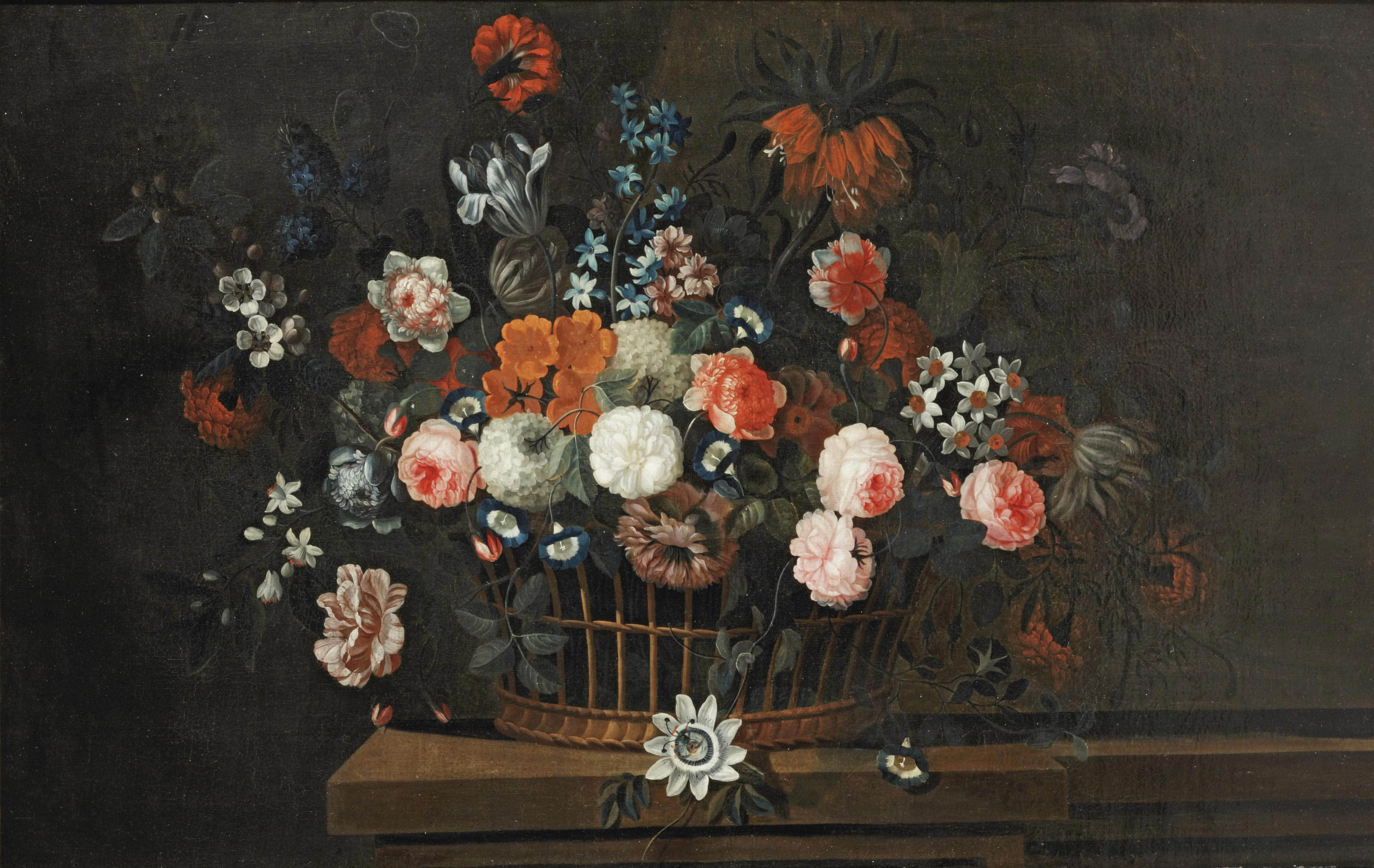
Wicker basket with roses, tulips, hyacinths and other flowers, on a wooden ledge

After about four years in de Crépu's workshop, Hardimé was registered as master in the Antwerp Guild of Saint Luke in the guild year 1688–89. He worked in Antwerp where he was the teacher of his brother Pieter Hardimé. The early biographer Jacob Campo Weyerman claims that he studied oil painting with Hardimé. He also stated that Hardimé spent much of his time drinking in taverns. This caused him to have money troubles. To escape his creditors he left Antwerp for The Hague where he stayed with his brother Pieter from 1697. He also worked for a while in Breda where he received a commission to paint a chimney piece for the palace of William III of England.

Hardimé left for London in 1702 where he remained active for the rest of his life. He received commissions from the Earl of Scarborough.

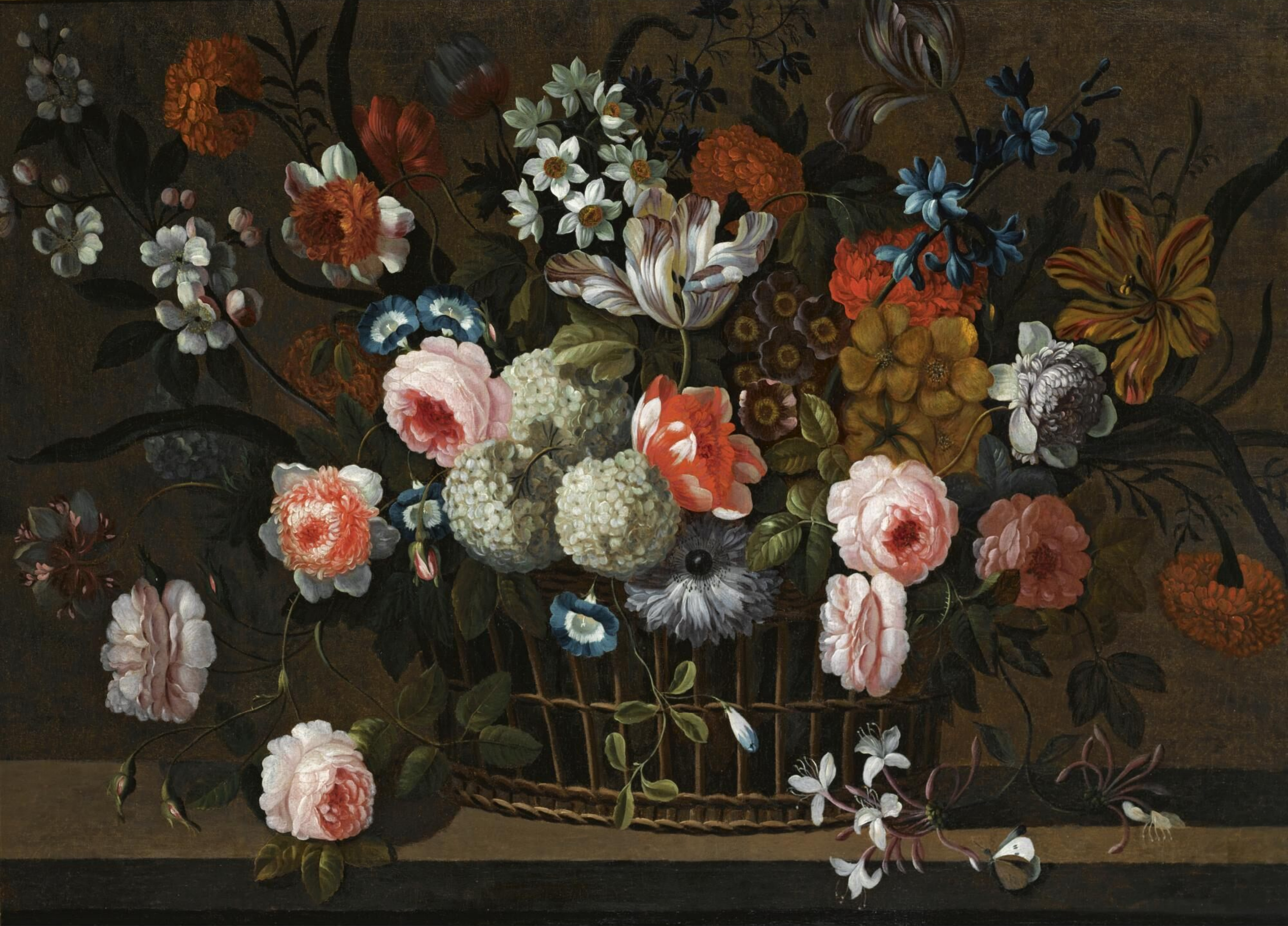
Still life of roses and other flowers in a basket on a stone ledge

He died in London in 1737.

== Works ==
Hardimé was a painter of still lives with flowers. In the typical Flemish tradition, he painted these directly from nature.

He preferred decorative effect over naturalistic representation. This is in line with trends in Flemish still life painting at the end of the 17th century and shows the influence of the French artist Jean-Baptiste Monnoyer, who worked for King Louis XIV of France. The trend was initiated by contemporary Flemish artists Jan Baptist Bosschaert and Gaspar Peeter Verbruggen the Younger. The two artists often placed their flower bouquets in large stone vases or arranged them in the form of garlands around these vases or garden ornaments. In many of their compositions the vases were placed in outdoor settings with figures. This decorative style was followed not only by Simon Hardimé but also by his brother Pieter and Pieter Casteels III.

He painted the still life elements in the works of other painters such as Hendrik Herregouts.
