= Jan Baptist Bosschaert =

Flemish painter (1667–1746)

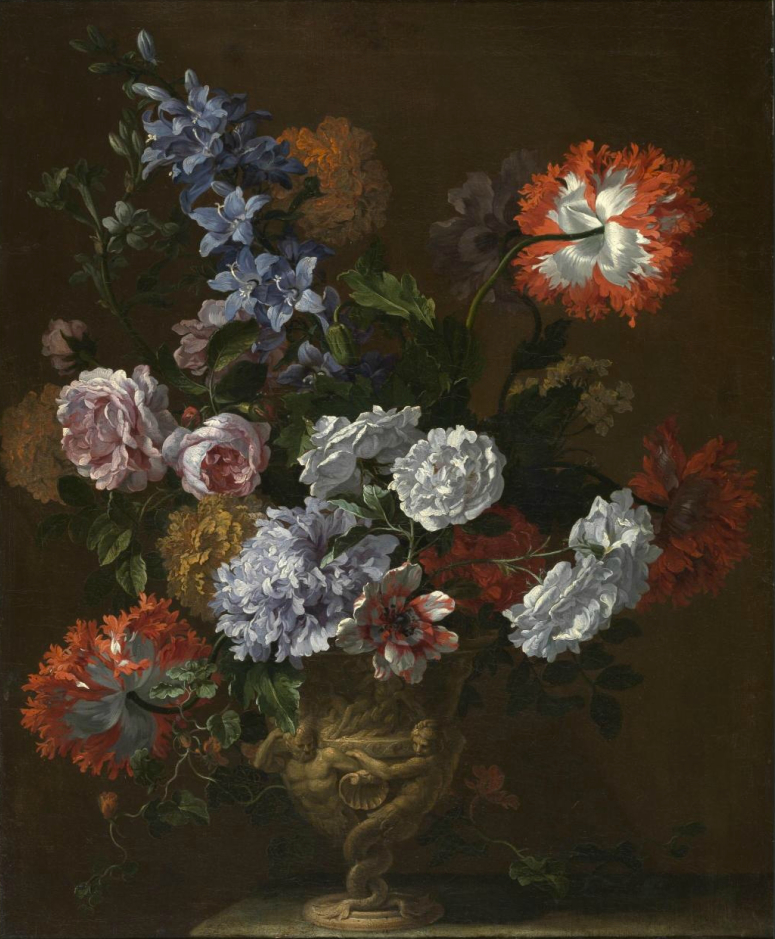
Flowers in a sculpted vase

Jan Baptist Bosschaert or Jan Baptist Bosschaert the Younger (baptized on 17 December 1667 in Antwerp − 1746 in Antwerp) was a Flemish still life painter who is principally known for his decorative still lifes with flowers. He collaborated with figure artists on compositions which combined allegorical or mythological scenes with a still life element. He was active in Antwerp.

== Life ==
Jan Baptist Bosschaert was born in Antwerp as the son of the painter-baker Jan Baptist and his second wife Joanna de Bie, the sister of the painter Erasmus de Bie. His father died young leaving Jan Baptist in a poor home and without education. He was reportedly still illiterate at the age of 17.

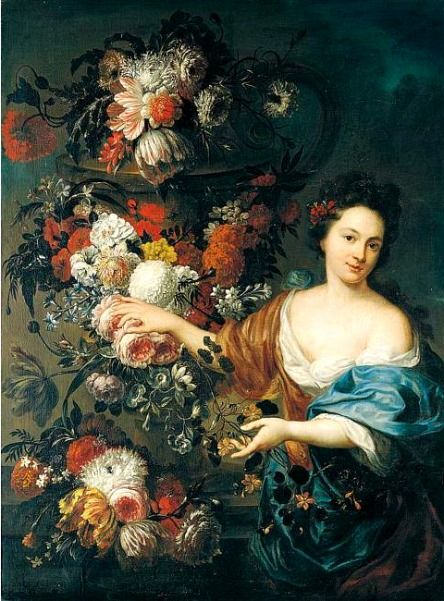
Still life of flowers with a young woman.jpg

As the young Jan Baptist showed talent for art his brothers who were his guardians placed him in the care of the flower painter Jan Baptist de Crépu. He studied with de Crépu starting from the year 1685. He lived also in de Crépu's house. Another pupil of de Crépu who studied at the same time as Bosschaert was the flower painter Simon Hardimé. Jan Baptist de Crépu fled his creditors in 1688 and died in Brussels the next year.

Bosschaert became in the Guild year 1692–1693 a master of the Guild of Saint Luke of Antwerp. Bosschaert was active in Antwerp as a flower painter and received many commissions from the local bourgeoisie. Nothing is known about his personal life.

He died in Antwerp in 1746.

== Work ==
=== General ===
Bosschaert was a specialist still life painter mainly of large flower still lifes. Not many signed works by his hand are known and many may still be located in private collections without proper attribution.

Together with those of his near contemporary Gaspar Peeter Verbruggen the Younger, his works represent a development towards a more decorative style in late 17th century Flemish still life painting. The two artists placed the flower bouquets in large stone vases or arranged them in the form of garlands around these vases or garden ornaments. In these works garlands of sumptuous flowers are entwined around sculpted urns. The vases were often placed in outdoor settings with figures. This style was followed by Simon Hardimé, Pieter Hardimé and Pieter Casteels III. His large vertical paintings with their tripartite division followed Gaspar Peeter Verbruggen the Younger's compositions.

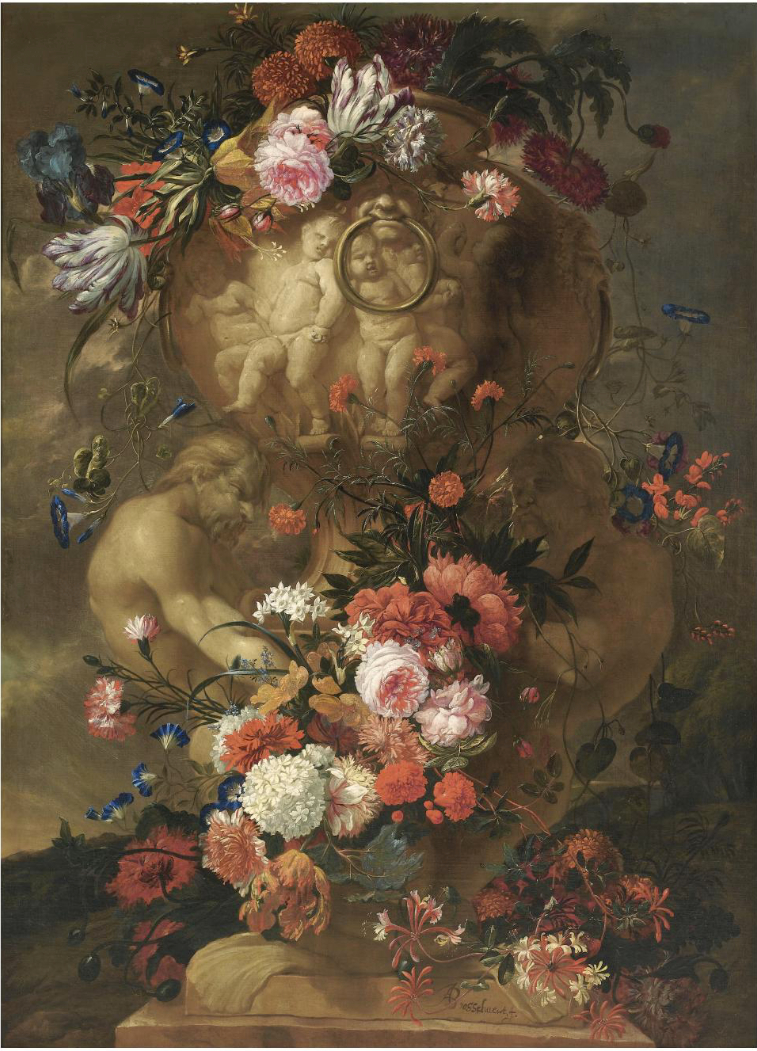
Still life of elaborate sculpted urns decorated with flowers

In its use of broad, impasto brush strokes, the style of his work reflects developments initiated by Italian artists Mario Nuzzi and Michele Pace del Campidoglio. The work of the French painter Jean-Baptiste Monnoyer was also an influence.

=== Collaborations ===
Bosschaert collaborated with various specialist painters including the figure painter Jacob Leyssens The Antwerp painter Peeter-Frans Bailliu painted the vases, figures and grisailles in some of his compositions. The collaborative works involved typically a female figure representing an allegorical or mythological figure or putti with a large flower piece. This likely went back on 16th century motifs of the goddess Flora in her garden.

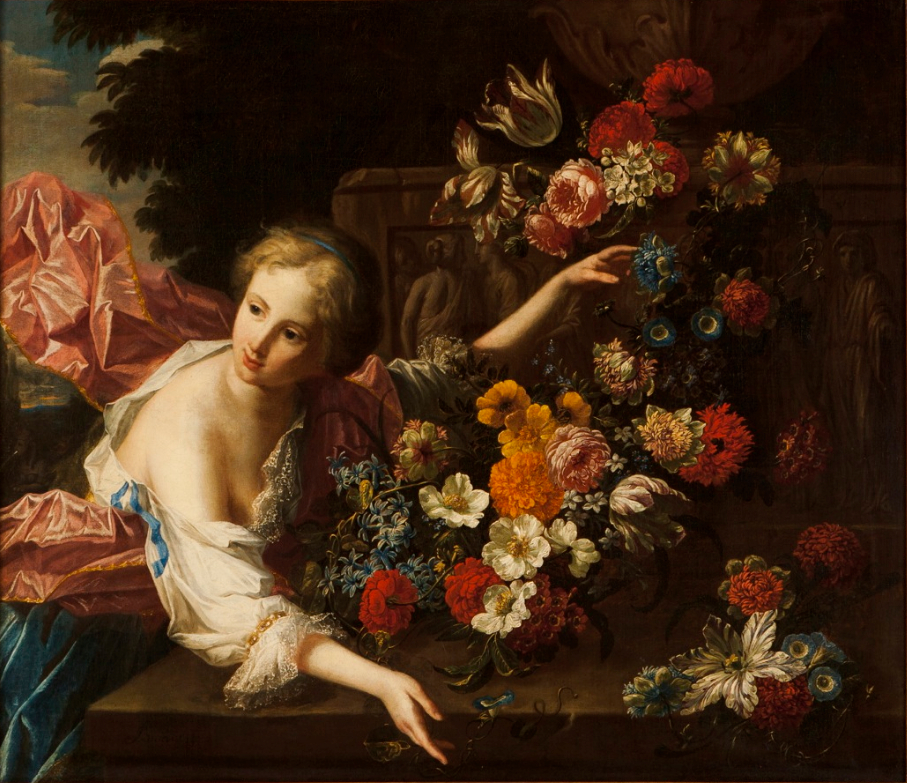
Young woman in front of a classical relief surrounded by flowers

Bosschaert also produced 'garland paintings', an older genre of flower representation invented in early 17th century Antwerp by Jan Brueghel the Elder. The genre was subsequently practised by leading Flemish still life painters, such as Daniel Seghers. Paintings in this genre typically show a flower or, less frequently, fruit garland around a devotional image or portrait. In the later development of the genre, the devotional image was replaced by other subjects such as portraits, mythological subjects and allegorical scenes.

Garland paintings were usually collaborations between a still life and a figure painter. Sometimes the still life painter would paint the garland and only much later another painter would add the figures or grisaille in the centre. The centre in some of the garland paintings that have been preserved were never filled by an image. The cartouche in the center of Bosschaert's garland paintings was usually filled with non-religious imagery such as portraits and mythological scenes. The Garland of flowers surrounding a medallion enclosing an early Christian motif (Auctioned at Bonhams 9 December 2015 in London lot 90W) is an example of a garland painting by Bosschaert. It has a Christian motif rendered in grisaille.

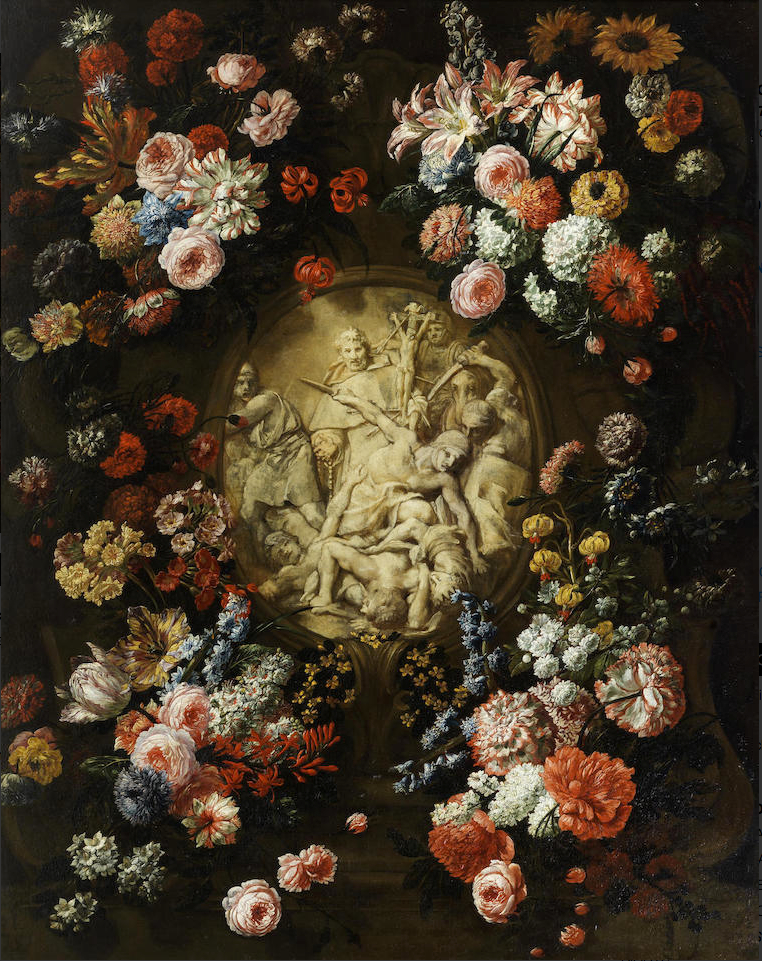
Garland of flowers surrounding a medallion enclosing an early Christian motif
