= Jan Baptist de Crépu =

Walloon officer and painter

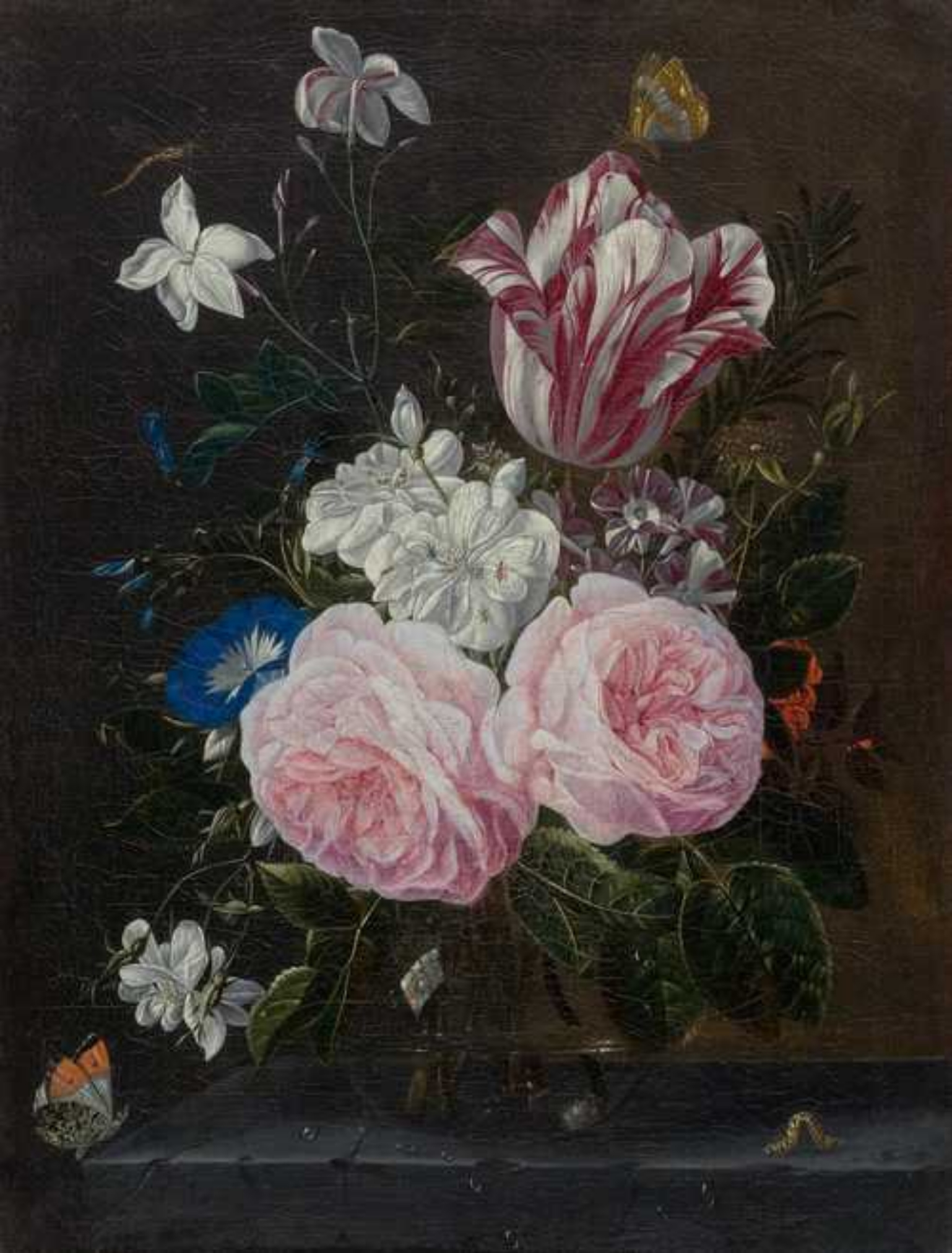
Bouquet of Flowers in a Glass Vase With Butterflies and a Small Caterpillar On a Stone Plinth

Jan Baptist de Crépu or Jean Baptiste de Crépu (before 1640 – before 17 June 1689) was a Walloon officer in the Spanish service and a flower painter who after retiring from military service operated a workshop in Antwerp. He trained the flower painters Simon Hardimé and Jan Baptist Bosschaert.

== Life ==
Details about de Crépu's origins are not entirely clear. He was of Walloon descent and initially had a career as an officer in the Spanish service. Only at the age of about 40 did he decide to become a painter. He settled in Antwerp where he likely trained. He was registered as a master in the Antwerp Guild of Saint Luke in the guild year 1684–1685.

In 1685 he received Jan Baptist Bosschaert as an apprentice. Bosschaert also lived in de Crépu's house during his apprenticeship. Another pupil of de Crépu who started studying under de Crépu in late 1685 was the flower painter Simon Hardimé. The early biographer Jacob Campo Weyerman claims that he also knew de Crépu and admired his work.

Before becoming a master painter de Crépu married Maria Anna Pauli or Pauwels on 31 December 1682 in Antwerp. His wife was the daughter of the miniature painter Andries Pauli the Younger, who had become a master in the Antwerp Guild in the guild year 1654–1655. The couple had one son and one daughter.

De Crépu later fled his creditors and moved to Brussels where he died.

He died before 17 June 1689, the date on which his widow declared before the Antwerp magistrate that she was a widow.

== Works ==
De Crépu was known for his still life of flowers painted from nature. While he seems to have been respected in his lifetime and trained two successful flower painters, only one signed work of his has been preserved. The work is the Bouquet of Flowers in a Glass Vase With Butterflies and a Small Caterpillar On a Stone Plinth (at Koller Auktionen Zurich on 22 September 2017, lot 3041). It is close in style to that of the Antwerp flower painters Nicolaes van Verendael and Jan Philip van Thielen. Some art historians also see in this work the influence of Jan Davidsz. de Heem who worked for a long time in Antwerp.

A few large-scale flower still lifes by de Crépu were auctioned on 15 May 1741 at an Antwerp auction. He is known to have collaborated with other painters in Antwerp including the Antwerp figure painter Peter Ykens.
