= Robert Furber =

British horticulturist

Robert Furber (1674–1756) was a British horticulturist and writer, best known for writing the first seed catalogue produced in England.

Furber was a member of the "English Society of Gardners", a group formed in 1724 to protect the reputations of plant growers by mutually agreeing to names for newly identified plants. Furber contributed to the group's work, including collaborating on a book documenting the plants identified by the group.

He had a nursery in Kensington in London (near modern Hyde Park Gate/Gloucester Road) from around 1700 until his death. It was taken over by his colleague John Williamson, then others and survived until the 1840s.

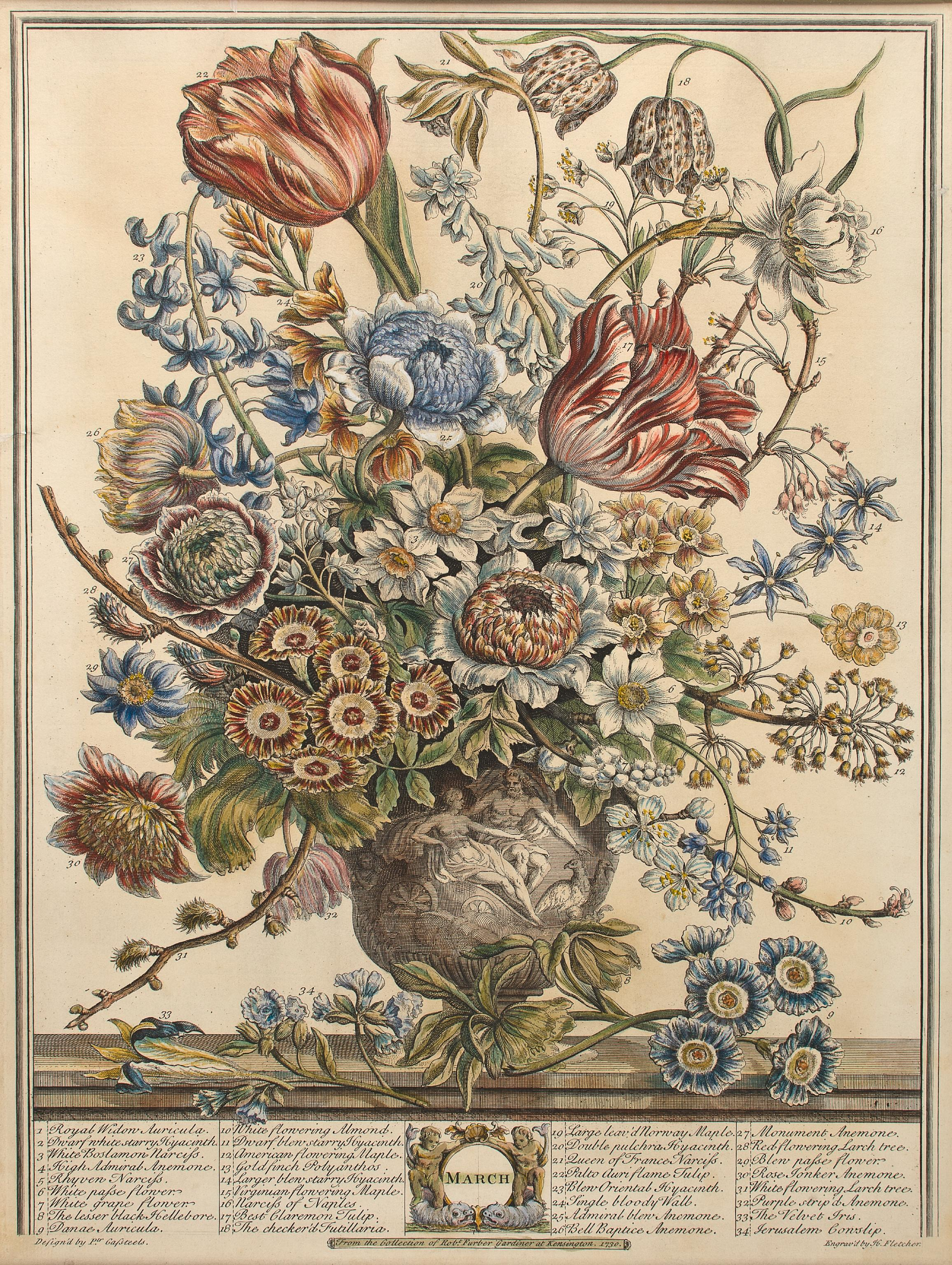
March. In: Twelve Months of Flowers, 1730. (Henry Fletcher produced each of the twelve hand-colored engravings from paintings by Pieter Casteels).

Furber's most notable work was Twelve Months of Flowers, published in 1730. The book was written as a catalog of plants and seeds, and featured twelve detailed engravings of seasonal plants in bloom. Henry Fletcher produced each of the twelve hand-colored engravings from paintings by Pieter Casteels. Each plant was numbered, with a list of the corresponding species names provided. More than 400 different species of plant were featured. The plates were originally sold on a subscription basis for £1 5s in uncolored form, or £2 12s 6d for a colored version. The book was reprinted in 1982.

In 1732, Furber produced a follow-up work entitled Twelve Months of Fruit. Like his previous collection of flowers, Twelve Months of Fruit featured twelve full-color plates with 364 different fruit. Each plate focused on one month, and showed the varieties of fruit that would ripen during that month.

Other works by Furber include a 1732 book entitled The Flower Garden Displayed, a general-purpose book written for a wider audience.

He also had a position as an overseer of the poor in Kensington (St Mary Abbots parish, 1718) and was a churchwarden between 1725–6 and 1736–7.

== Personal life ==
He married Mary Everton in about 1706 and they had one son, William. He was buried at St Mary Abbots on 1 September 1756.
