= Henry Fletcher (engraver) =

English engraver

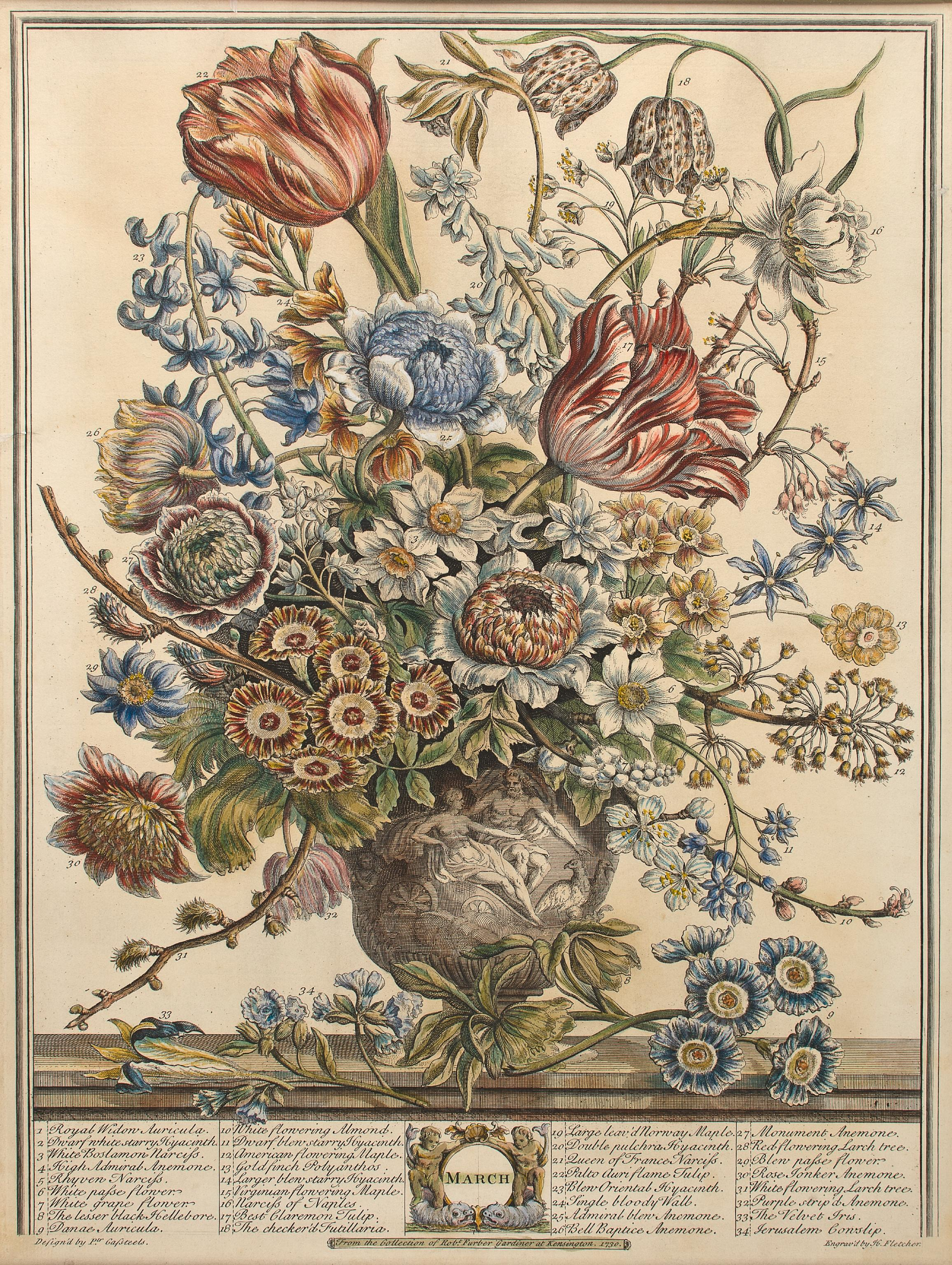
Henry Fletcher produced each of the twelve hand-colored engravings from paintings by Pieter Casteels for Twelve Months of Flowers by Robert Furber (1730).

Henry Fletcher (fl. 1710–1750), was an English engraver.

Fletcher worked in London, and produced engravings possessing some merit. He most excelled as an engraver of flowers, notably The Twelve Months of Flowers and The Twelve Months of Fruits, engraved from drawings by Pieter Casteels, made in 1730 for a publication by Robert Furber, the well-known gardener. He also engraved some fine plates of birds from drawings by Casteels and Charles Collins. He engraved some of the vignettes and tail-pieces to the first edition of Voltaire's Henriade, published in London in 1728.

Among his other works were Bathsheba’ after Sebastiano Conca; a set of views of Venice, engraved with L. P. Boitard after Canaletto; ‘A View of Stocks Market in 1738,’ and ‘A View of the Fountain in Temple Gardens,’ after Joseph Nichols; A View of Bethlehem Hospital, Moorfields, and portraits of Robert Nelson (1715), after Kneller, Ebenezer Pemberton (1727), and the Rev. Robert Warren.
