= Jacob Campo Weyerman =

Dutch painter

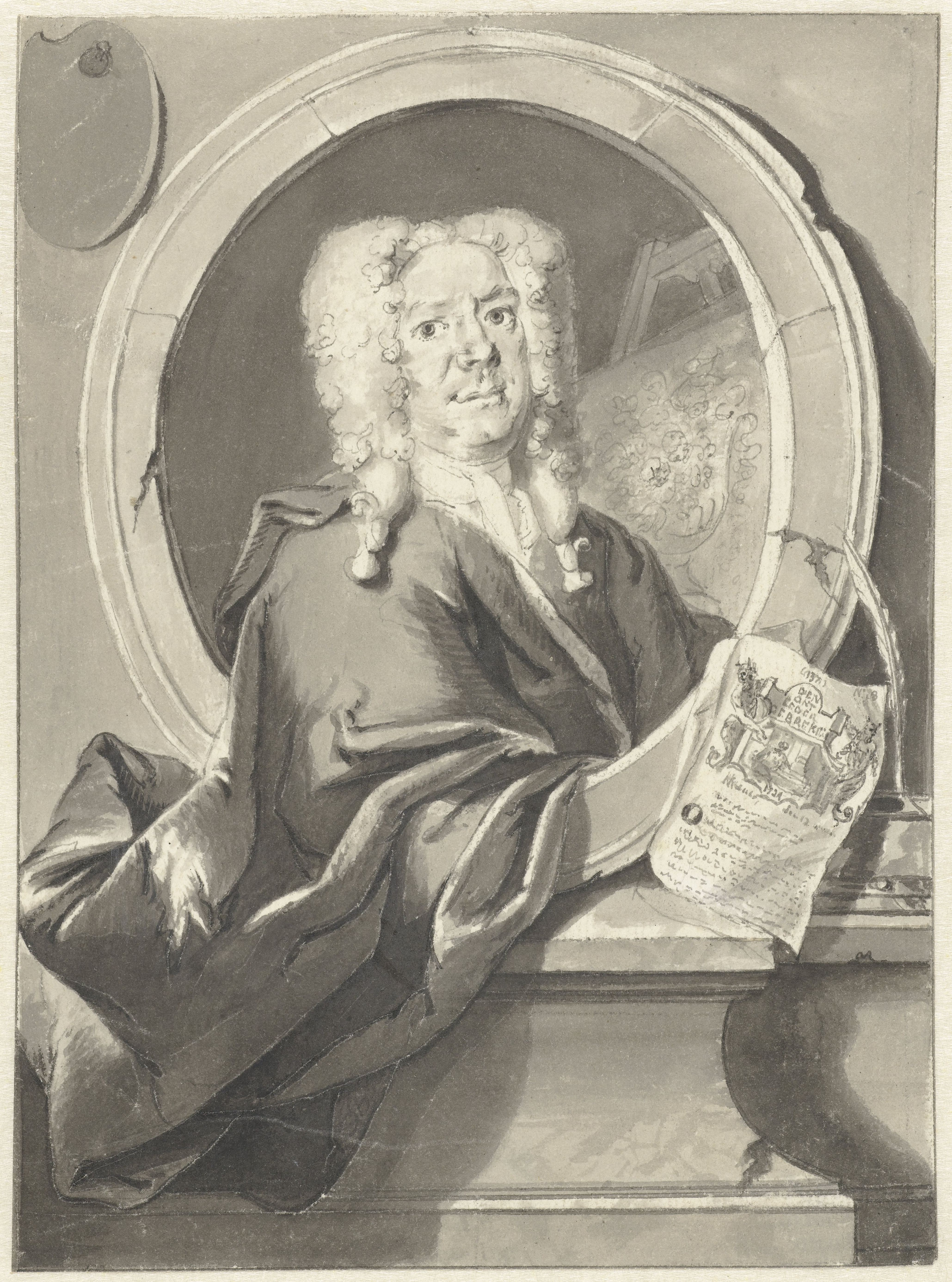
- Jacob Campo Weyerman aged 48, drawing by Cornelis Troost
- Born: Jacob Campo Weyerman; 9 August 1677; Charleroi
- Died: 9 March 1747 (aged 69); The Hague
- Known for: Painting, Literature
- Movement: Baroque

Jacob Campo Weyerman (9 August 1677 – 9 March 1747) was a painter and writer during the period known as the Dutch Enlightenment. His work encompassed flower and fruit still life paintings, satirical magazines, plays, and biographies of painters. He usually signed his paintings with Campovivo.

== Biography ==
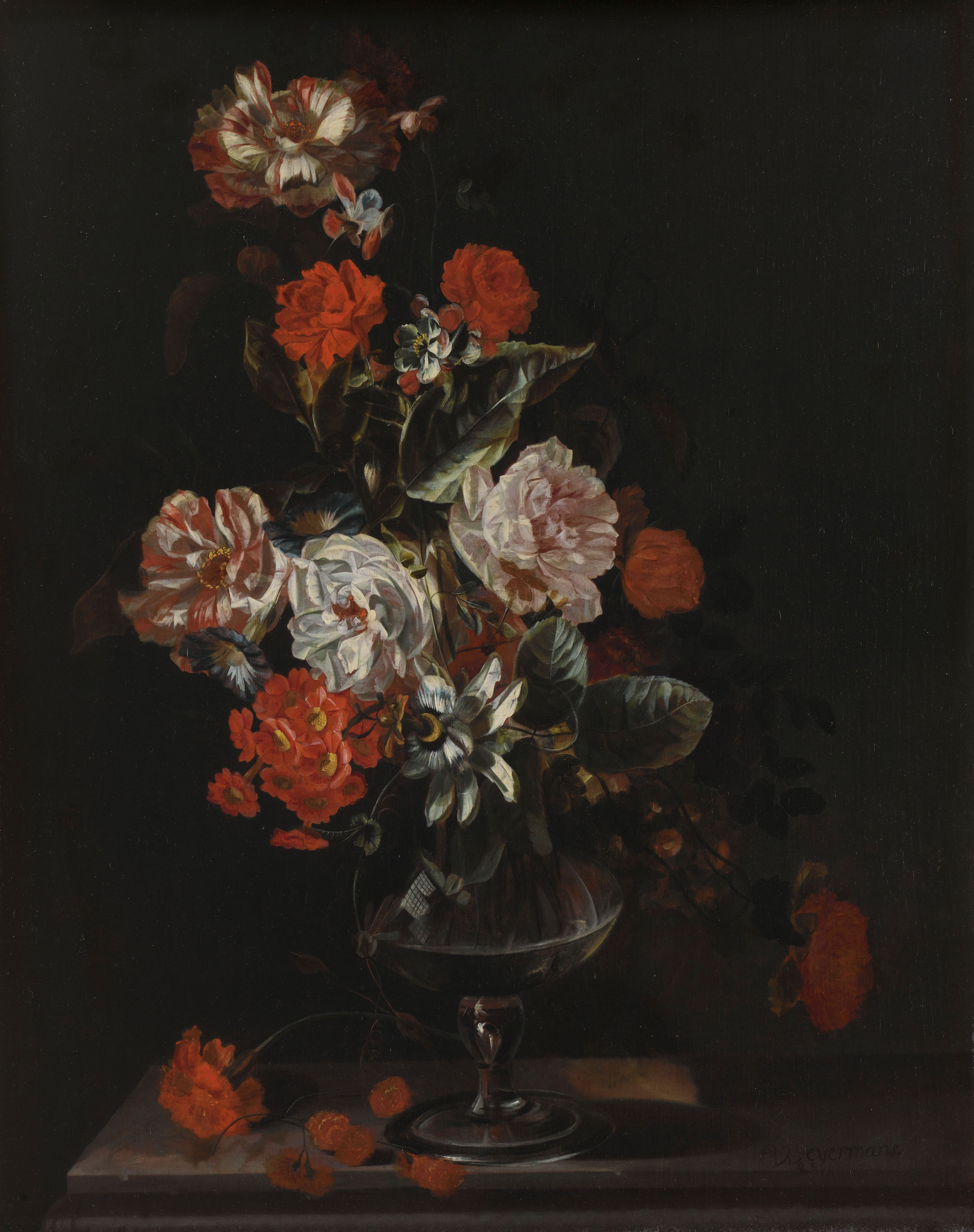
Still life of flowers in a glass vase, Rijksmuseum

As tradition holds, he was born in a military camp outside Charleroi, where his father fought in the Dutch army against the French. His mother was a very independent woman of Scottish descent, Elisabeth Sommeruell, who kept a market tent in Charleroi and eventually was able to afford a house in the center of Breda. There he was taught in the arts and on reaching his majority, traveled to London in 1704 and found work at the academy of Godfried Kneller.

He claims that he also studied oil painting with the Flemish flower painter Simon Hardimé. He specialized in the painting of flowers and fruit. According to the almost contemporary artist biographer Arnold Houbraken, he was a member of the Bentvueghels with the nickname Compaviva, but this may be a mistake. Though Weyerman was known for his embellishments of the truth, he never boasted about the Italian bent. Houbraken may have confused him with Jakob Christoph Weyermann, a German painter active in Augsburg in the first half of the 17th century. In 1720 he returned to the Netherlands and started a periodical called Hermes.

He wrote prose in a colorful style, and could flatter as easily as he offended his contemporaries. Jacob Campo Weyerman is not only interesting to modern readers for his literary qualities, but also as a source for historians on cultural life in the 18th century. Especially his magazines give a glimpse of daily life in Dutch taverns and coffee houses and the tourist attractions.

== The Lives of Dutch painters and paintresses ==
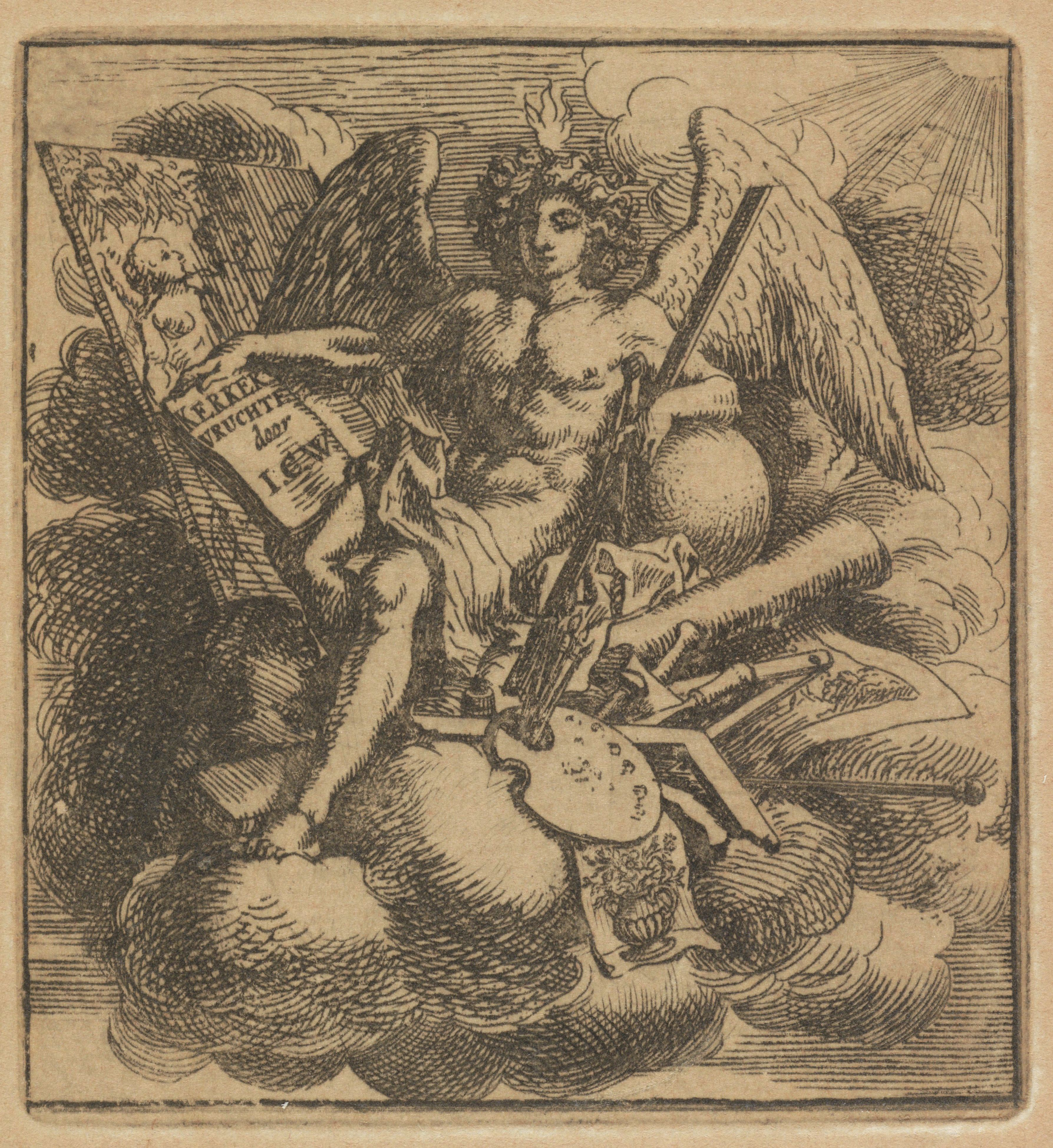
Allegory of painting

After Arnold Houbraken died, he also published biographies of painters in his De levens-beschryvingen der Nederlandsche konst-schilders en konst-schilderessen, or The Lives of Dutch painters and paintresses, in four parts during the years 1729–39. Though leaning heavily on Houbraken's work, he seems to have intended his version as a rebuttal to some of the anecdotes in Houbraken's work. Moreover, Weyerman also made use of one of Houbraken's sources, namely Cornelis de Bie's Het Gulden Cabinet. Houbraken's son Jacobus Houbraken, who had helped his mother finish Houbraken's third volume, also helped Weyerman with engravings and made the portrait of him in his book after a design by Cornelis Troost.

In the decorative frame of the portrait, a piece of paper illustrating a book title page shows the words "Den Ontleeder der Gebrekken", which means the Anatomist of Faults. It is unclear today how many of Weyerman's anecdotes are based on truth or fiction. His weekly magazines were very popular. Their sensationalism and emphasis on scandals caused him to have many enemies which led to his conviction for slander and a life sentence. This was a particularly heavy sentence, and he lived in the prison in The Hague from 1738 until his death nine years later at the age of 69.

== Literary works ==
- Democritus en Heraclitus Brabantsche Voyage (1701)
- De Rotterdamsche Hermes (1720–1721)
- Den ontleeder der gebreeken. Deel 1 (1724)
- Historie des Pausdoms (1725–1728)
- Den ontleeder der gebreeken. Deel 2 (1726)
- De levens-beschryvingen der Nederlandsche konst-schilders en konst-schilderessen, door Jakob Campo Weyerman, Konst-schider. Verrijkt met nieuwe Vignetten, Vierde Deel. Te Dordrecht, By Ab. Blussé en Zoon, MDCCLXIX (1729–1769)
- De Leevensbyzonderheden van J.H. baron van Syberg (1733)
- Den adelaar (1735)
