= Alexander Casteels the Elder =

Flemish painter

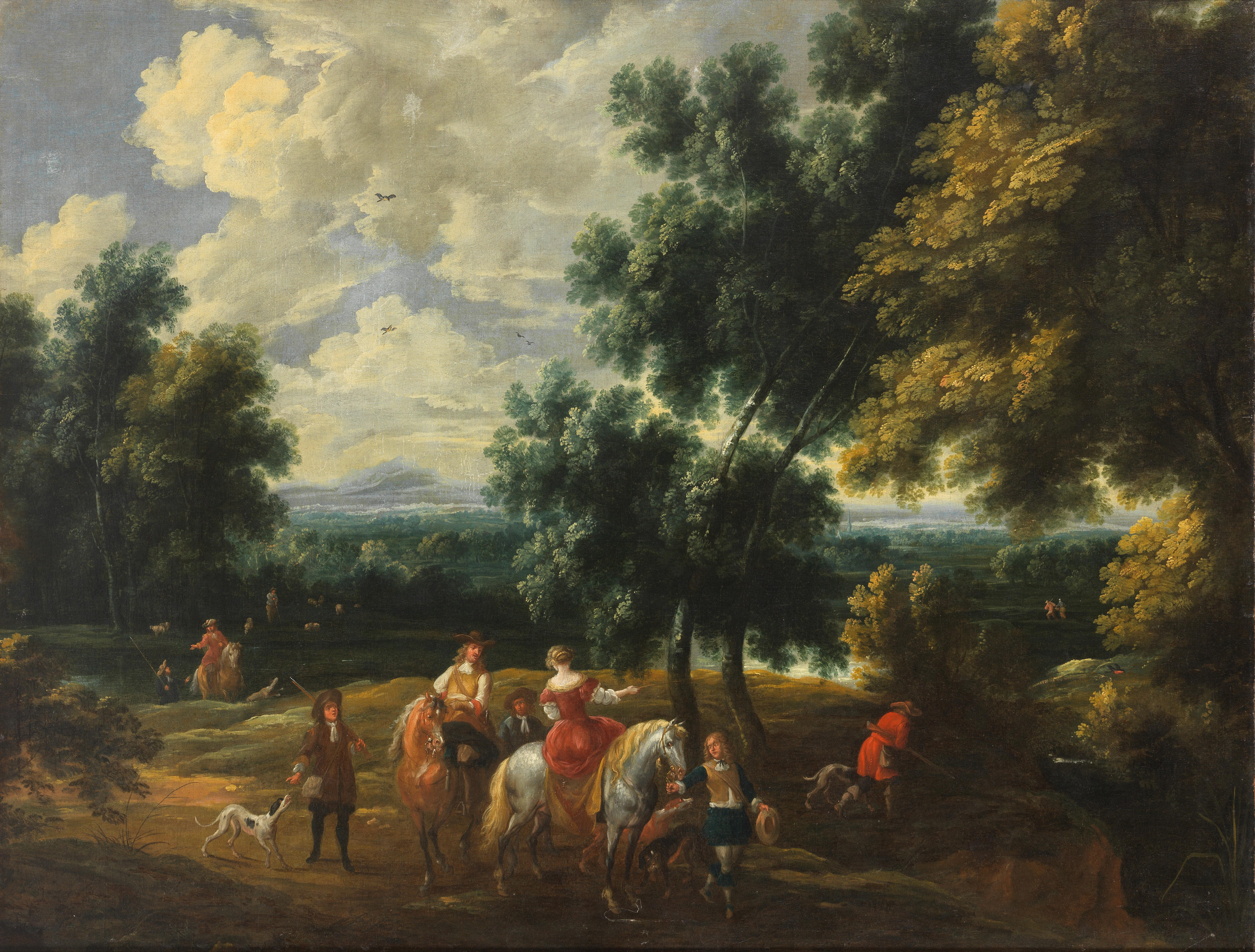
Hunting party before an extensive landscape

Alexander Casteels the Elder or Alexander Casteels (I) (c. 1635 – 1681–82) was a Flemish painter and draughtsman. He is known for his battle scenes and landscapes with hunters and elegant companies.

== Life ==
Casteels was born in Antwerp. His date of birth likely fell in the period from 1634 to 1636. He was admitted as a ‘wijnmeester’ (‘wine master’, meaning a son of a master) in the Antwerp Guild of St. Luke in the guild year 1658–1659.

He married Catharina Theresia de Poorter. The couple had a son called Josephus Franciscus Casteels. Casteels worked with the Antwerp art dealers Forchondt who traded his works throughout Europe. He was one of the leading artists of the Forchondt firm in the second half of the century. They mainly sold his works in Central and Eastern Europe where there was a demand for his hunting and battle scenes among the local aristocrats. He belonged to the higher paid artists working for Forchondt.

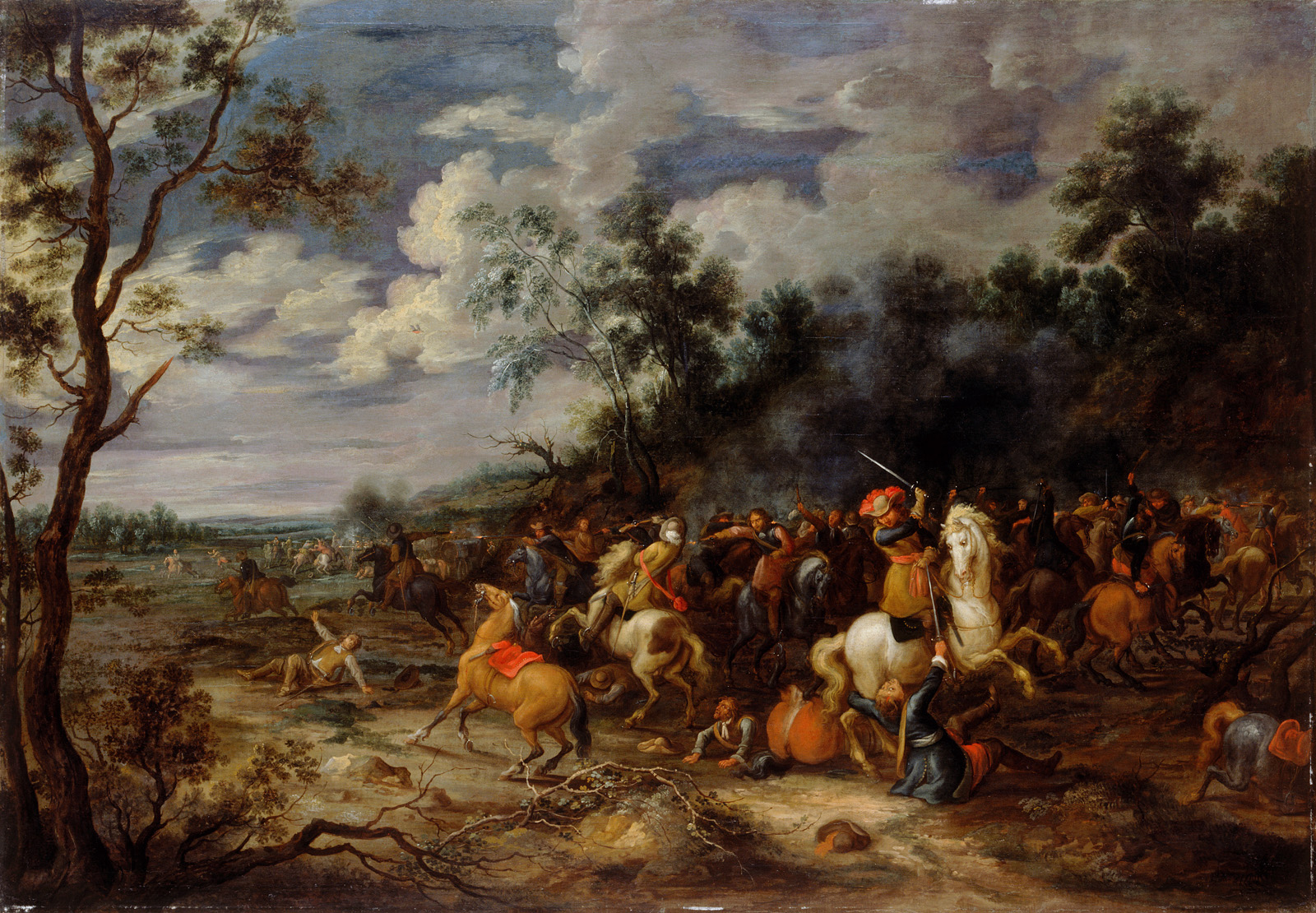
Joshua Fights the Amalekites

He died in Antwerp between 18 September 1681 and 18 September 1682 since his death duties were paid to the Guild during that period.

== Work ==
He specialised in scenes of cavalry battles and landscapes with hunters and elegant companies. His cavalry battles do not depict any recognisable historical events but are imaginary such as in the case of the Joshua Fights the Amalekites (National Gallery of Slovenia), which depicts a story from the bible. In this work the artist has taken inspiration from prints produced after the paintings of Antonio Tempesta. This is visible in the composition, the treatment of the landscape and the arrangement of the horses and riders. He also often painted the then popular theme of the battle between Christians and Turks, two examples of which are in the collection of the Bavarian State Painting Collections. The son of the founder of the Forchondt firm who was living in Vienna specifically requested for small and large-scale battle scenes by Alexander and that of another battle painter active in Antwerp called Pauwels Casteels, possibly a family member, to be sent to Vienna as there was a strong demand for their battle scenes in Central and Eastern Europe.
