= Seth Casteel =

American photographer

Seth Casteel is an American photographer, known primarily for his photographs of underwater dogs.

== Early life ==
Casteel is from Decatur, Illinois, but lives in New York City and Venice Beach, California. Casteel is a self-taught professional photographer.

== Career ==
In 2007, Casteel began volunteering to photograph homeless pets to help them find adoptive families. In 2011, Casteel was struggling financially when he spent several thousand dollars on an underwater camera apparatus and started taking pictures of dogs swimming underwater.

On February 9, 2012, Casteel's photos of underwater dogs were posted to Reddit and Google+. His photographs went viral and were viewed by millions. Traffic on his own website increased from 200 per day to 100,000 per day. He subsequently published a book of his photographs, Underwater Dogs, which became a New York Times Bestseller, in fact its best selling photography book of 2012.

Since then, Casteel has worked primarily as a pet photographer, accepting commissions and commercial assignments, and exhibiting his artwork in galleries around the world. His work has been published in National Geographic Magazine, The New York Times, The Telegraph, Huffington Post and in numerous other websites and publications. Casteel has also appeared on Good Morning America, EXTRA, Jeopardy!, The Insider and Inside Edition.

== Later activities ==
Casteel founded a non-profit organization, One Picture Saves a Life, to improve the image of animal rescue and adoption initiatives through photography.

Some of Casteel's pictures of infant swimming were published in the New York Times magazine in June 2014.
