= Homer Casteel Jr. =

American artist and writer

- Born: July 25, 1919; Canton, Mississippi, U.S.
- Died: April 29, 1972 (aged 52); Meridian, Mississippi, U.S.
- Education: University of Mississippi; Art Institute of Chicago
- Occupations: Painter, sculptor, writer, teacher
- Parent: Homer Casteel

Homer Casteel Jr. (July 25, 1919 - April 29, 1972) was an American painter, sculptor, writer and teacher. He was the chairman of the art department at Meridian Junior College.

== Life ==
Casteel was born on July 25, 1919, in Canton, Mississippi. His father, Homer Casteel, served as the lieutenant governor of Mississippi from 1920 to 1924. Casteel graduated from the University of Mississippi with a bachelor of arts degree in 1942, and he earned a master in fine arts from the Art Institute of Chicago. He served in the United States Navy during World War II.

Casteel began teaching at the Meridian Junior College in 1956, and he eventually became the chairman of its art department. He also taught night classes at Millsaps College in Jackson. As a painter and a sculptor, he exhibited his work in the United States and Mexico, including a solo exhibition at the Meridian Museum of Art in November–December 1971. He authored a book about bullfighting.

Casteel died on April 29, 1972, in Meridian, Mississippi.

== Selected works ==
- Casteel, Homer Jr. (1953). The Running of the Bulls: A Description of the Bullfight. New York City: Dodd, Mead & Co. OCLC 906129601.
