= Pauwels Casteels =

Flemish painter

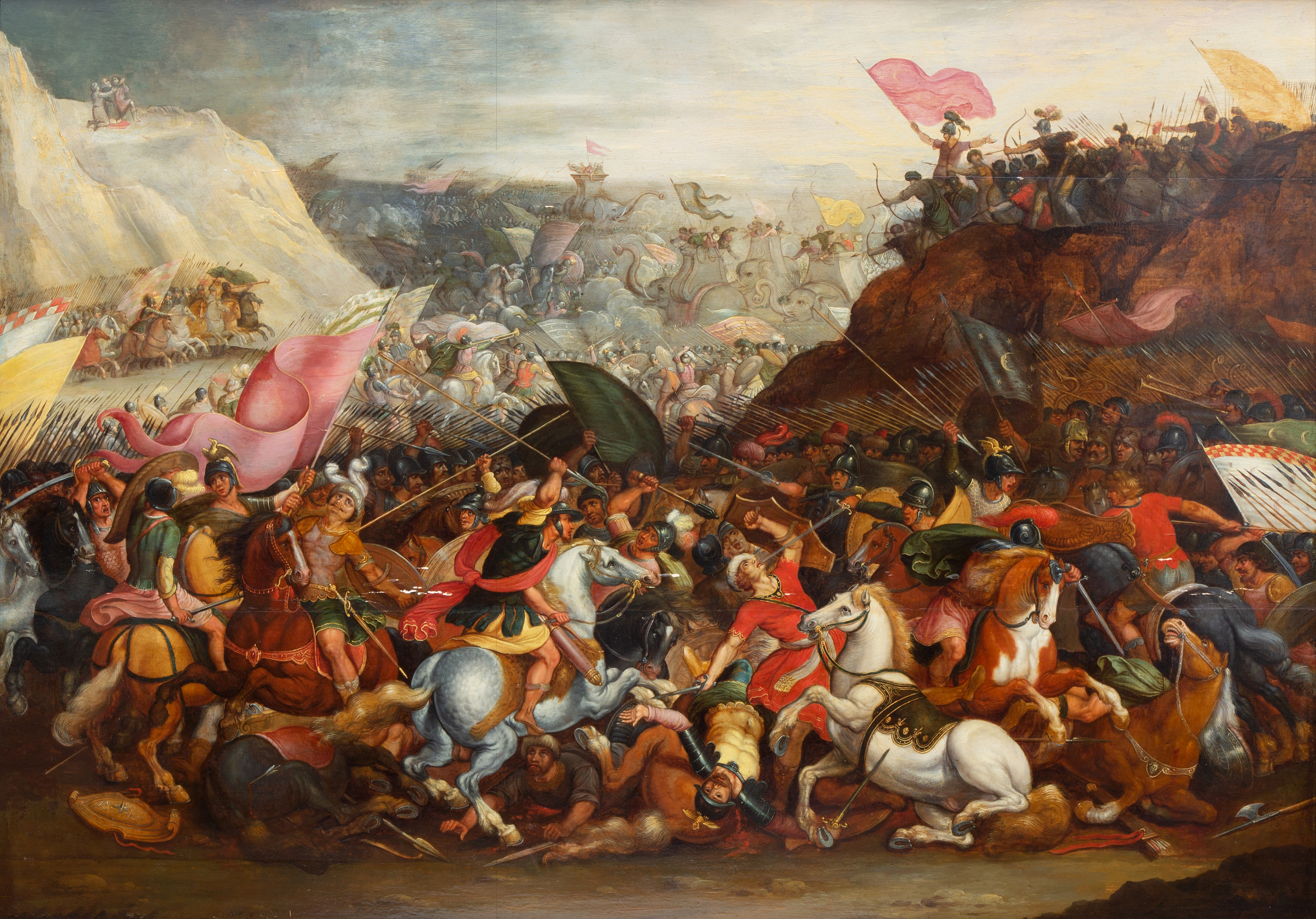
Hannibal in the Alps

Pauwels Casteels or Pauwel Casteels (c. 1625 in Antwerp – after 1677 in Antwerp) was a Flemish painter and draughtsman. He worked in Antwerp and is known for his battle scenes and landscapes with mythological, historical and biblical scenes.

== Life ==
Casteels was born in Antwerp around 1625. He was admitted as a ‘wijnmeester’ (‘wine master’, meaning a son of a master) in the Antwerp Guild of St. Luke in the guild year 1649–1650. In the Guild year 1656-1657 he had a pupil called Jan-Batista Marien registered at the Guild.

Casteels' works were distributed by the Antwerp art dealers Forchondt who traded artworks throughout Europe. The son of the founder of the Forchondt firm who was living in Vienna specifically requested for small and large-scale battle scenes by Paul and that of another battle painter called Alexander Casteels the Elder, possibly a family member, to be sent to Vienna as there was a strong demand for their battle scenes in Central and Eastern Europe.

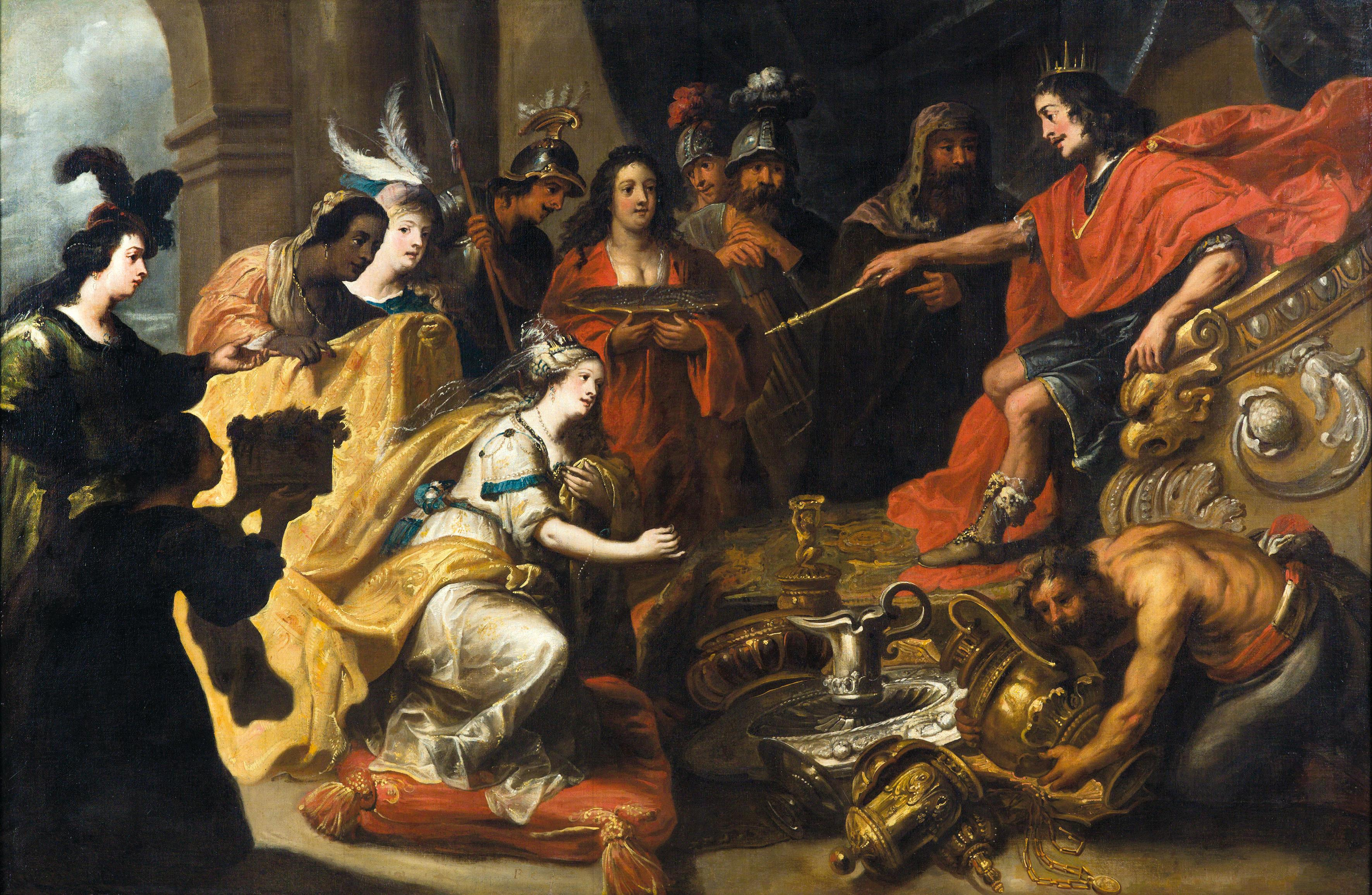
The Queen of Sheba before King Salomon

It is not known when or where he died. His latest dated work is the Battle between king John Sobieski III and the Turks (At Sotheby's Milan auction, 1 June 2005 lot 48), which is signed and dated to 1677.

== Work ==
Casteels was a versatile painter who painted cavalry battles and scenes with mythological, historical and biblical stories. His historical and mythological scenes often depicted bacchanalia and sea triumphs. He usually painted on large canvases. His works have at times been attributed to other Flemish painters, such as Jan Cossiers, Simon de Vos and Cornelis de Vos.

His battle scenes were very popular in Central Europe and one example is in the collection of the Bavarian State Painting Collections. These scenes were influenced by fellow Flemish battle painters Pieter Snayers and Pieter Meulener, of whom he adopted the colour palette. His battle scenes are often crowded compositions with many figures engaged in frenzied battle. The figures in these compositions are individualised thus luring the viewer into the details of the scene.

Due to the stylistic similarities, some of his battle paintings may have been attributed to fellow Antwerp battle painter Alexander Casteels the Elder.
