= Homer Casteel =

American politician

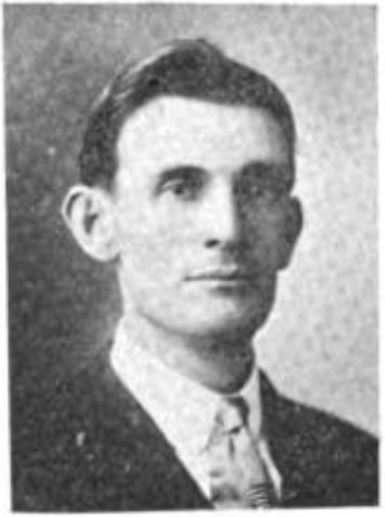
- Casteel in 1917

Lieutenant Governor of Mississippi
- In office January 1920 – January 1924

President pro tempore of the Mississippi Senate
- In office January 1928 – January 1932

Member of the Mississippi Senate from the 18th district 21st (1916-1920)
- In office January 1928 – January 1932
- In office January 1916 – January 1920

Personal details
- Born: April 14, 1879 Walnut Grove, Mississippi
- Died: December 11, 1958 (aged 79)
- Party: Democratic

Homer Harris Casteel (April 14, 1879 – December 11, 1958) was an American politician in the state of Mississippi who served in the Mississippi Senate and as Lieutenant Governor of Mississippi from 1920-1924. He served in the Mississippi Senate from 1912 to 1914 and 1916 to 1918. He served again from 1928 to 1932 as president pro-tem of the Mississippi Senate.

== Career ==
Casteel was the son of Marion Lafayette Casteel (1833-1892) and his wife Virginia Lindsey Casteel (1843-1914). He went to the public schools in Leake County and attended Mississippi Central Normal School in Walnut Grove. In 1911 he was living in Pickens, Mississippi and was elected to the state senate from Holmes County (21st district). He was re-elected in 1915. In 1919 Casteel ran successfully for lieutenant governor on a ticket with fellow Democrat Lee M. Russell. While Governor Russell was out of state briefly, Casteel issued several controversial pardons; one was challenged in court but was held valid by the Mississippi Supreme Court. Casteel also cast a tie-breaking vote to pass the Nineteenth Amendment in the Mississippi Senate in 1920 (although the amendment was then voted down, for a second time, in the House.)

After his term in office he purchased 400 acres near Canton, Mississippi and built a home there named "Poverty Hill". In 1927 he was elected to another term in the state senate, this time from Madison County, and served as senate president pro tem. He then was appointed to the Tax Commission, serving until 1934, and in 1935 was elected to the Railroad Commission, which was renamed the Public Service Commission at his suggestion. Re-elected three times, he served 16 years on the commission, serving most of those years as chairman. In 1941 he moved from the plantation to a house in the town of Canton.

Casteel was a delegate to the 1928 Democratic National Convention in Houston, Texas and served as the chairman of the Mississippi delegation. On the last day of the convention he rode a donkey down the aisle to his seat carrying an image of nominee Al Smith.

He was a Methodist and a member of the masons.

== Family ==
On June 9, 1913 Casteel married Jean Calahan (1889-1914) of Pickens, who died September 9, 1914. On August 17, 1917 he married Annie Winters (1890-1970). They had one son, artist Homer Casteel Jr. (1919-1972).

Casteel is buried in the Canton City Cemetery in Canton.
