= Peter Frans Casteels =

Flemish painter

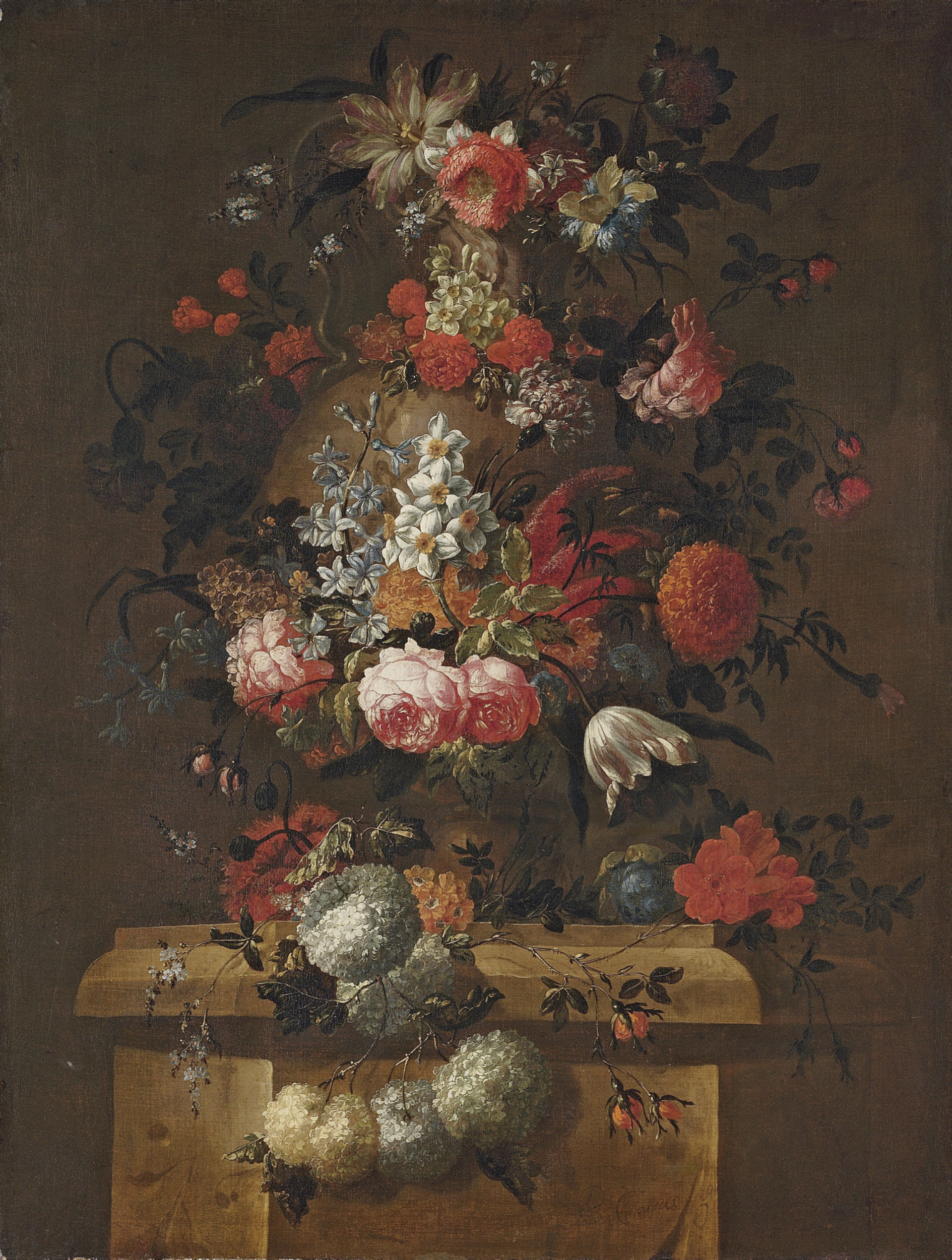
Roses, daffodils, peonies, lilies and other flowers in a sculpted urn on a stone plinth

Peter Frans Casteels(c. 1675–1697 or after) was a Flemish painter, who was active in Antwerp. He is mainly known for his flower still lifes.

== Life ==
Details about his life are quite scarce. He likely was born in Antwerp around 1675. He was registered as an apprentice at the Guild of Saint Luke of Antwerp in the guild year running from 18 September 1690 to 18 September 1691. It is believed he studied under the prominent flower painter Gaspar Peeter Verbruggen the Younger. He was admitted as a master in the capacity of a 'wijnmeester' (son of a master) in the Guild in the guild year running from 18 September 1697 to 18 September 1698.

The date of his death is not known. It was likely he died in 1697 or later as he produced quite a number of paintings.

He is often confused with Pieter Casteels III, an Antwerp painter of still lifes mainly active in England in the 18th century.

== Work ==
Casteels painted decorative flowers still lifes in the style of his master Gaspar Peeter Verbruggen the Younger.
