= Pieter Casteels II =

Flemish painter

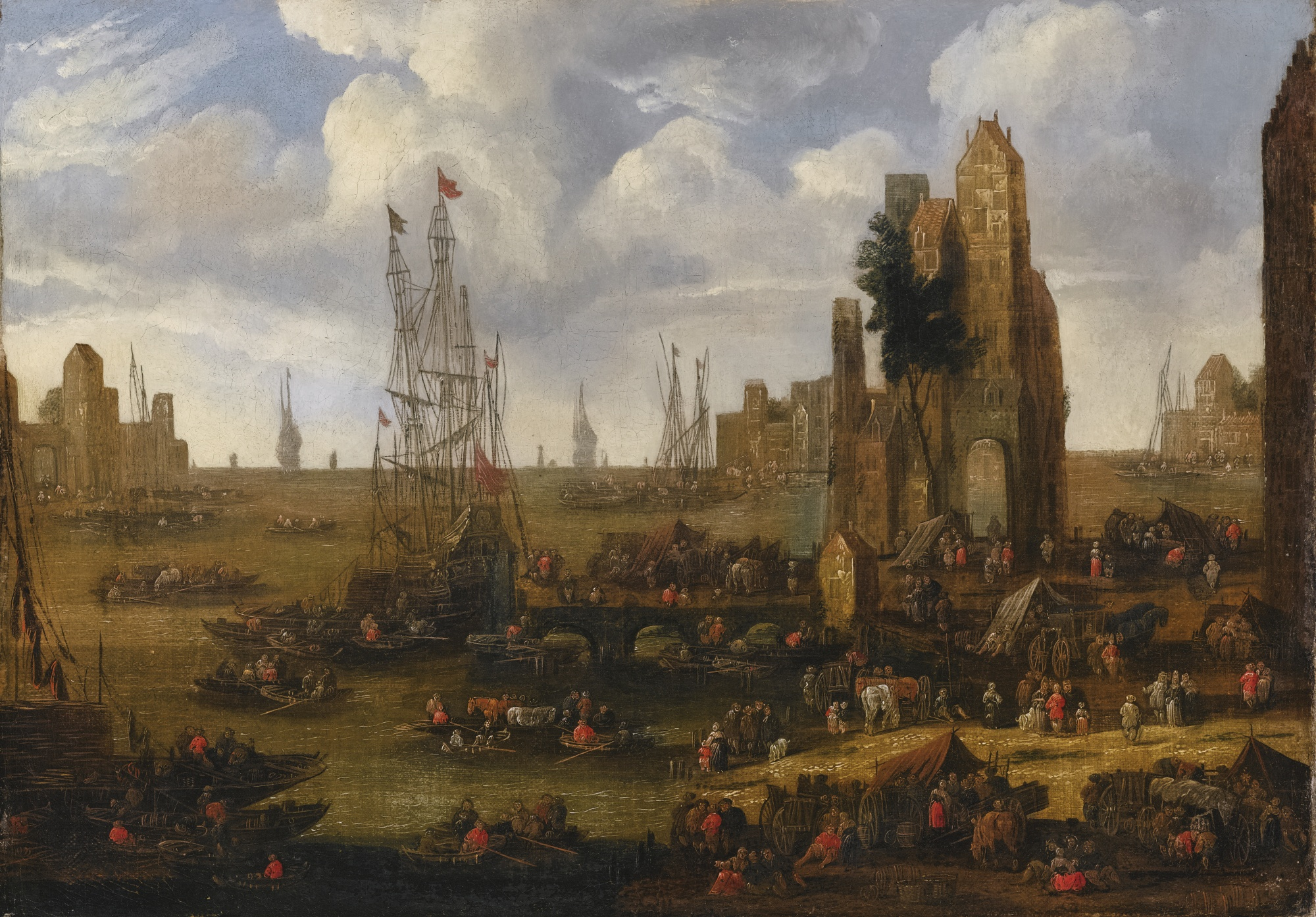
Capriccio View of a Busy Harbour Scene with Figures Loading their Boats

Pieter Casteels II or Pieter Casteels the Younger (fl. 1673–before 30 March 1701) was a Flemish painter mainly known for his imaginary Italianate landscapes and views of harbours.

== Life ==
Information about Pieter Casteels II is scarce. He was registered as a master of the Antwerp Guild of Saint Luke in 1673–1674. He married Elisabeth Bosschaert and their son Pieter Casteels III trained as a painter with his father. Their son became an accomplished still life painter who was active in England.

Pieter Casteels II was active in the late 17th century in Antwerp and died in the early 18th century.

== Work ==
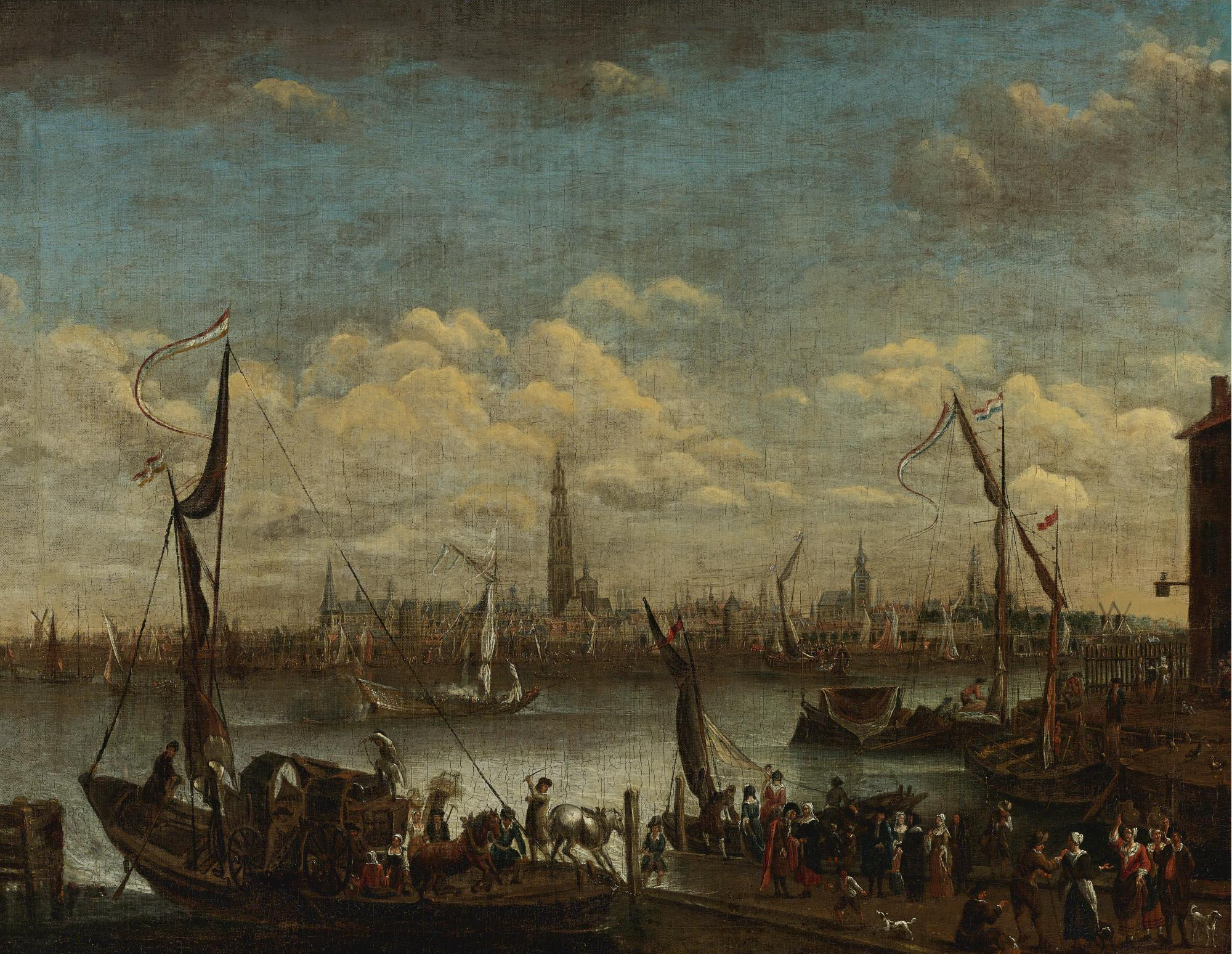
View of the Antwerp port

Pieter Casteels II is known for his landscape paintings. Most of these paintings are imaginary views of harbours in an Italianate style. They are typically populated with many figures and often feature fantastic high-rise buildings. He also painted a number of realistic landscapes including views of Paris and Antwerp. Some history paintings are also attributed to him.

His work is kept in the collections of museums such as the Louvre, the Statens Museum for Kunst, the Museo Nacional de Bellas Artes (Buenos Aires), the Musée des beaux-arts de Quimper and the Musée des Beaux-Arts et d'archéologie de Besançon.
