= Pieter Casteels III =

Decorative artist and painter (1684–1749)

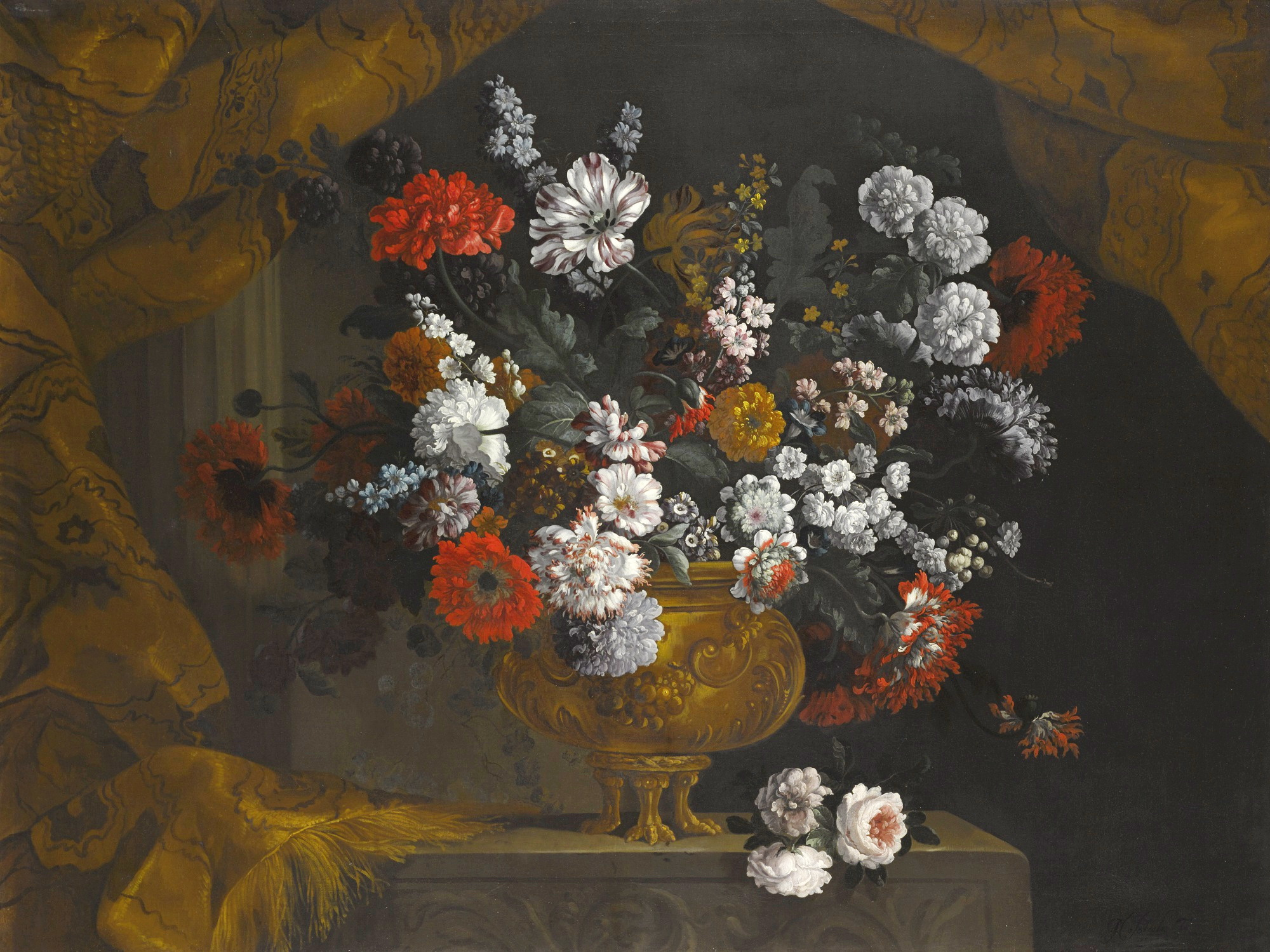
Still life of flowers in a gilt urn on a stone ledge

Pieter Casteels III (Note: Alternative names: Peter Casteels (III), Peter Castiels (III), Peter Kasteels (III)) (1684–1749) was a Flemish painter and engraver mainly known for his flower pieces, game pieces and bird scenes. He spent a significant portion of his life in England where he had a varied career as a still life painter, printmaker and textile designer.

== Life ==
Pieter Casteels III was born in Antwerp as the son of Elisabeth Bosschaert and Pieter Casteels II, a painter of landscapes and history paintings. He trained with his father. In 1708 he left with his brother-in-law Peter Tillemans to England to work for a picture dealer named Turner for whom they made copies of Old Master paintings. Casteels became an active participant in London's artistic community, subscribing to the Kneller Academy of Painting and Drawing in 1711 and becoming a member of the Rose and Crown Club. He returned briefly to Antwerp in 1712 where he became a member of the local Guild of Saint Luke in the same year.

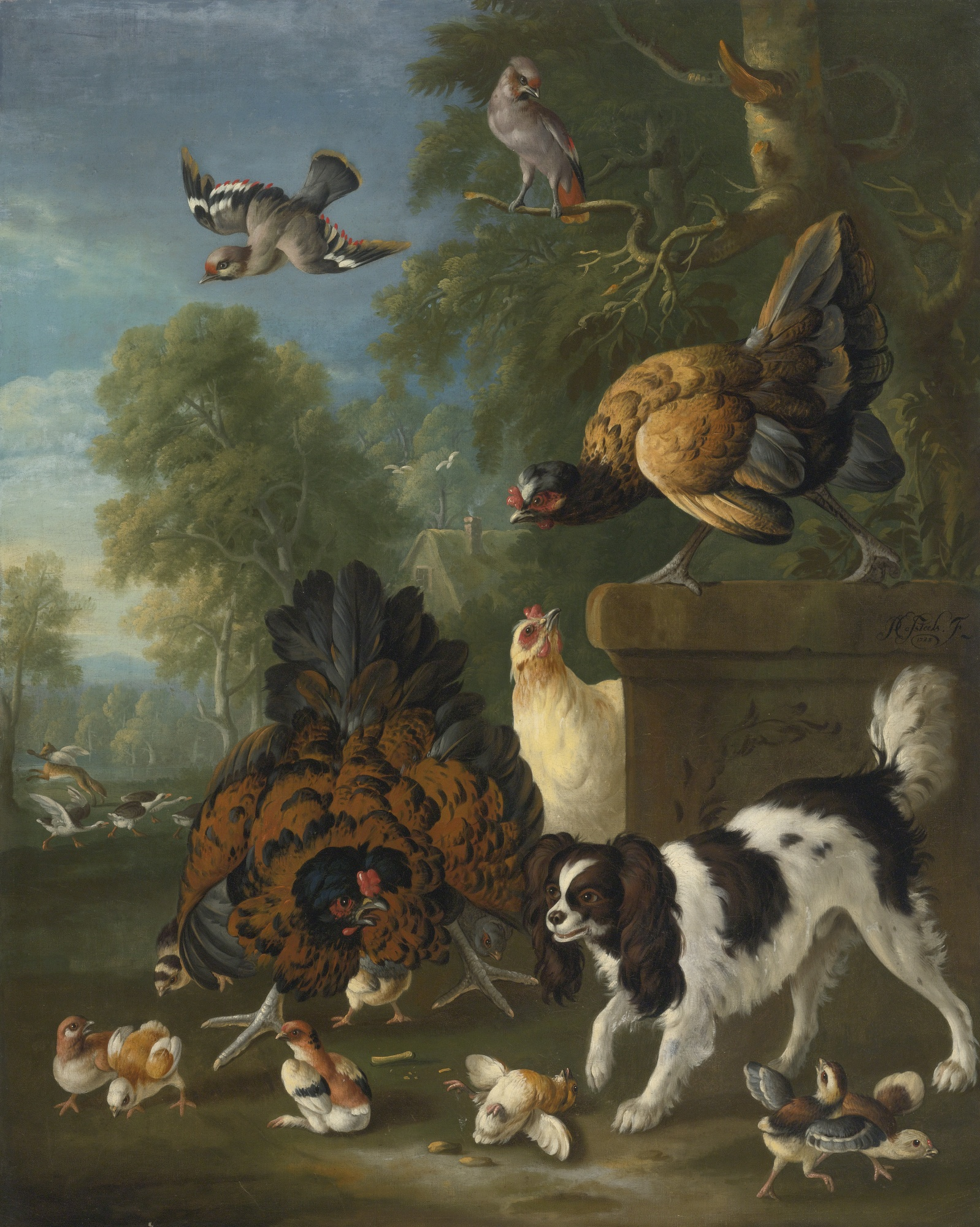
A family of chickens fending off a spaniel in a landscape

Casteels settled permanently in England around 1717. He developed a successful practice as a painter of flowers and exotic birds that chiefly served a decorative purpose as overdoors and chimney-pieces. He worked simultaneously as an art dealer and imported paintings from Europe. His customers included James Stanley, 10th Earl of Derby who bought imported art as well as original work of Casteels.

In 1726 Casteels launched a subscription for a set of 12 prints of birds, which he had etched after his own designs. The success of this project encouraged him to work on two further publications: the Twelve Months of Flowers and the Twelve Months of Fruit.

Casteels advertised the usefulness of the illustrations in these publications as patterns for workers in luxury industries. Casteels was thus able to demonstrate his potential as a textile designer. In May 1735 he retired from painting and spent his last fourteen years working for a calico manufacturer as a residential artist, first at Martin Abbey near Tooting, Surrey, and later, briefly, in Richmond, London.

He died on 16 May 1749 in Richmond after a long illness.

== Work ==
Casteels painted flowers, flower pieces, landscapes, bird scenes, game pieces and occasional portraits. He is often confused with Peter Frans Casteels, a still life painter active in Antwerp in the late 17th century. Some of his animal scenes show similarity with the style of Dutch master Melchior d'Hondecoeter and in some cases experts have been unable to determine whether to attribute a particular work to either master. As he spent most of his active career in England, a large portion of his work is in public and private collections in the UK.

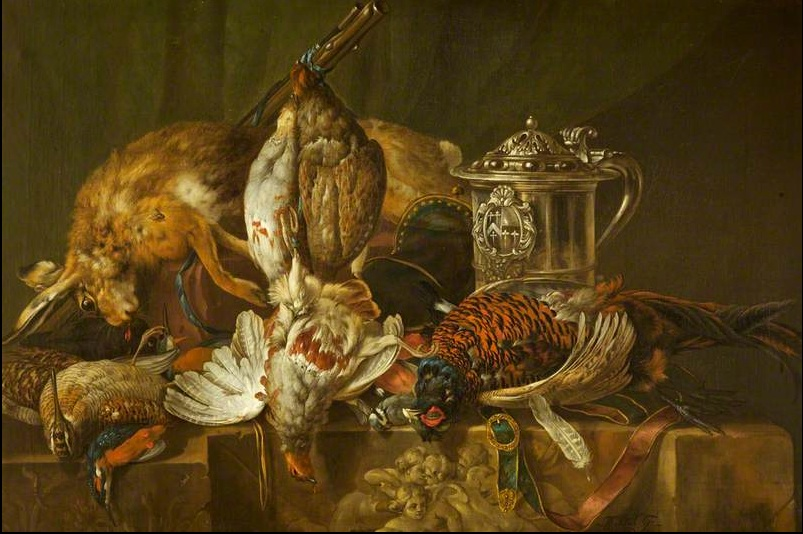
Still Life with Dead Game and a Silver Tankard

When in 1726 Casteels embarked on his first publishing venture, the production of 12 plates of bird scenes, he had not previously made any etchings except for two or three little plates as trials. The birds were depicted against gardens with classical decoration as background settings. The British Museum has a complete set of the original prints in its collection.

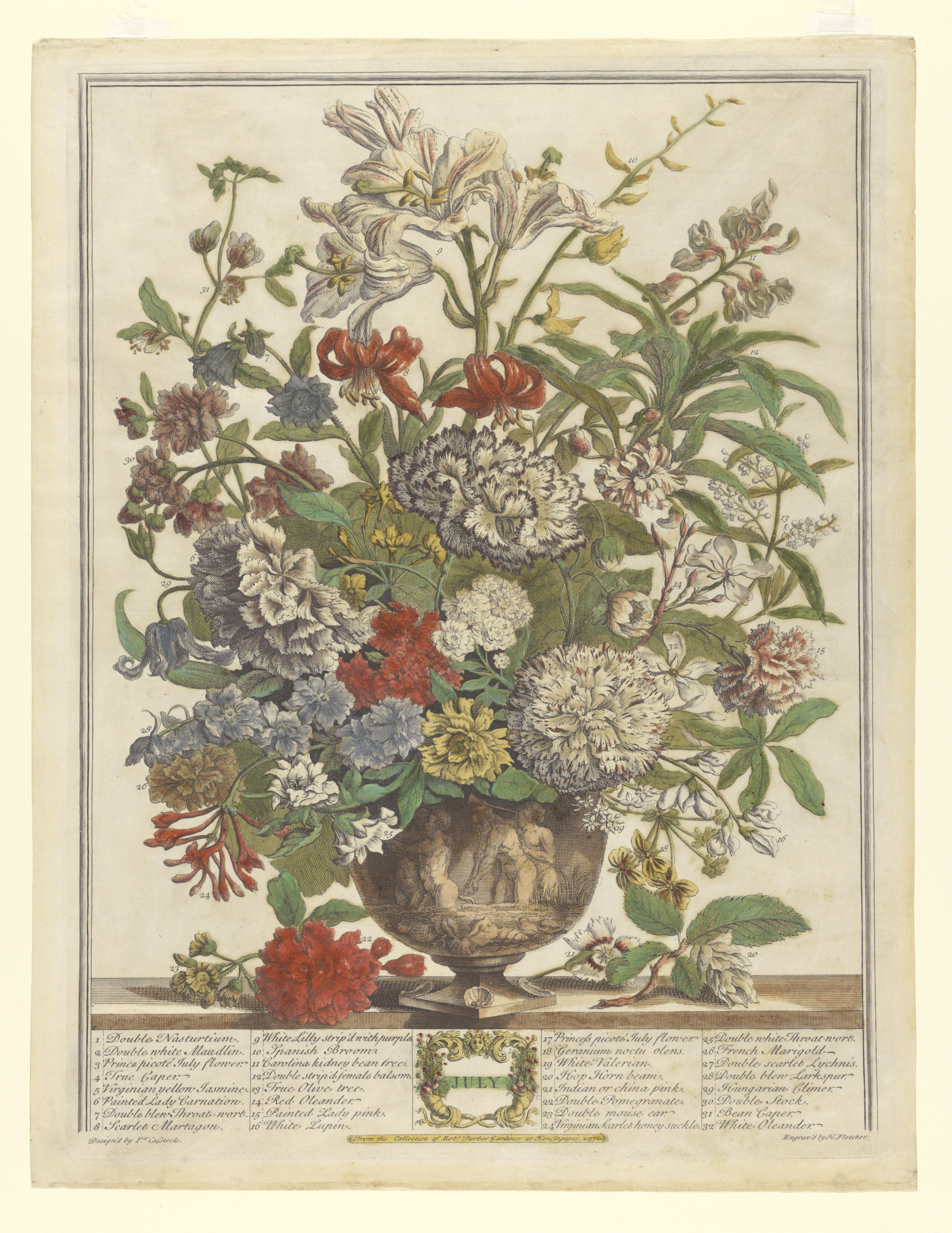
July from The Twelve Months of Flowers-

It is possible that the direct or indirect inspiration for the series of paintings on the 12 months made by Casteels was a series of the 12 months by the Antwerp painter Pieter Snyers. The 12 paintings by Casteels were engraved by Henry Fletcher and published by Robert Furber, a British horticulturist, under the title the Twelve Months of Flowers in 1730. The prints illustrate seasonal flowers that could be ordered from Furber and are thus the first illustrated nursery catalogue published in England. Each plant is numbered, with a list of the corresponding species names provided. More than 400 different species of plant are featured. For clear identification each flower is depicted facing to the front and is arranged separately.

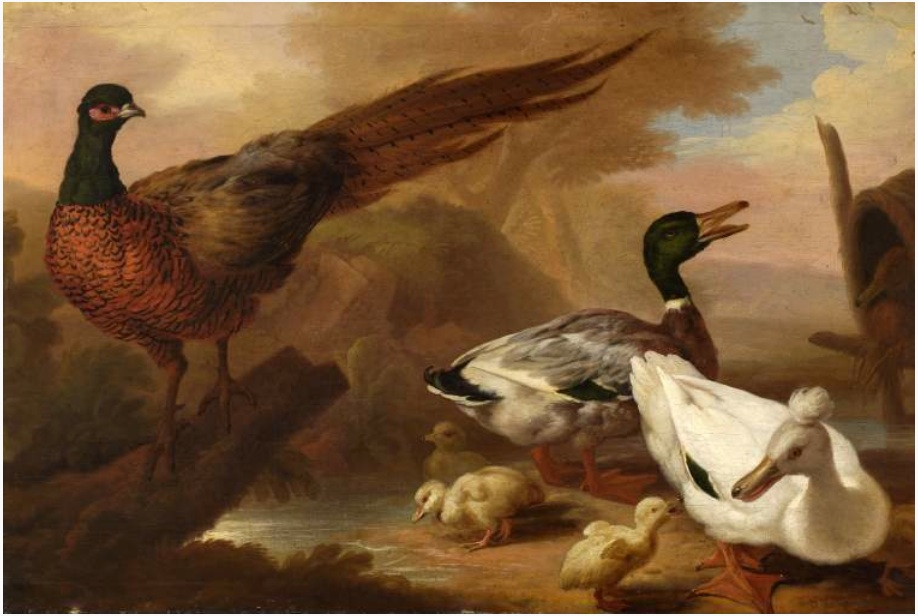
Pheasant and ducks

The plates were originally sold on a subscription basis for £1 5s in uncolored form, or £2 12s 6d for a colored version. The subscribers included members of the aristocracy. Casteels, Furber and Fletcher had each invested £500 in the publishing venture. As they were able to find 457 subscribers, they each made a handsome profit even before the sale of the prints, the plants or the original paintings. A second edition was published in 1734, which included "The Flower-Garden for Gentlemen and Ladies" not present in the first edition of 1730. The plates of the later edition were engraved by Peter Smith and are reductions of the originals. The book was reprinted in 1982. The complete set of the 12 original paintings, which Casteels made for the series, were sold by Christie's on 25 May 2005 in New York as lot 1529. The set of paintings and engravings inspired Jacob van Huysum, who had recently moved to London from Amsterdam, to paint his own set of Twelve Months of Flowers (Fitzwilliam Museum, Cambridge) between 1732 and 1736.

Furber published the Twelve Months of Fruit in 1732. Like the earlier publication on flowers, the Twelve Months of Fruit features 12 full-color plates, this time depicting 364 different fruit. Each plate focuses on one month and shows the varieties of fruit that ripen during that month.
