= Feast of the Gods =

Feast of the Gods or Banquet of the Gods may refer to:

- Feast of the Gods (art), a subject in Western art
  - The Feast of the Gods, a painting by Giovanni Bellini and Titian
  - The Feast of the Gods (van Bijlert), a painting by Jan van Bijlert
- Feast of the Gods (TV series), a 2012 South Korean television series

== See also ==
- Theoxenia, an Ancient Greek concept of hospitality to and among the gods
