= Feast of the Gods (art) =

Frequent subject of paintings based on Greco-Roman mythology

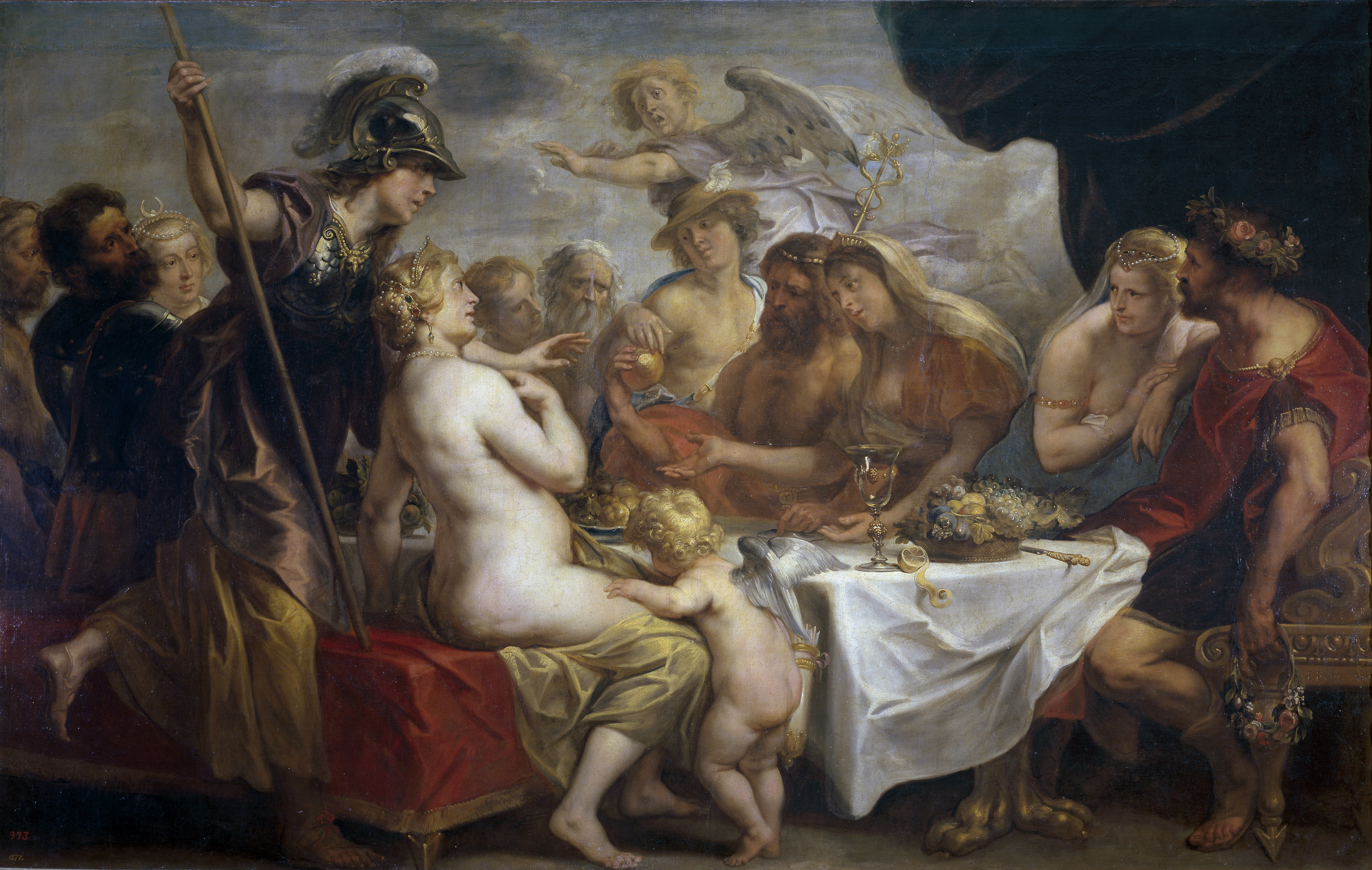
The Golden Apple of Discord at the wedding of Peleus and Thetis, Jacob Jordaens, 1633, 181 cm × 288 cm (71 in × 113 in), oil on canvas

The Feast of the Gods or Banquet of the Gods as a subject in art showing a group of deities at table has a long history going back into antiquity. Showing Greco-Roman deities, it enjoyed a revival in popularity in the Italian Renaissance, and then in the Low Countries during the 16th century, when it was popular with Northern Mannerist painters, at least partly as an opportunity to show copious amounts of nudity.

Often the occasion shown was specifically either the wedding of Cupid and Psyche or that of Peleus and Thetis, but other works show other occasions, especially the Feast of Bacchus, or a generalized feast. While the wedding of Cupid and Psyche is just the happy ending of Psyche's story, the wedding of Peleus and Thetis is part of the grand narrative of Greek mythology. The feast was interrupted by Eris, goddess of discord, who threw the golden Apple of Discord inscribed "for the most beautiful" into the company, provoking the argument that led to the Judgement of Paris, and ultimately to the Trojan War. Eris is sometimes shown in the air with the apple, or the apple with the diners, and sometimes the feast forms a background scene to a painting of the Judgement, or vice versa. This wedding was also used as a political symbol around the time of the marriage of the Dutch leader William the Silent to Charlotte of Bourbon in 1575.

Generally, despite Thetis being a sea-nymph, depictions of her wedding have the same inland setting as other scenes. A depiction by Hans Rottenhammer (1600, Hermitage Museum) probably of the wedding of Neptune and Amphitrite is set in a beach-side pavilion, with the sea full of an unruly crowd of marine mythological creatures. The Feast of Achelous is derived from Ovid in his Metamorphoses, who describes how Theseus is entertained by the river god in a damp grotto, while waiting for the river's raging flood to subside: "He entered the dark building, made of spongy pumice, and rough tuff. The floor was moist with soft moss, and the ceiling banded with freshwater mussel and oyster shells." The subject was painted a number of times, with Rubens producing an early version with Jan Brueghel the Elder, and a later picture attributed to his "school", and Hendrick van Balen collaborating with Jan Brueghel the Younger. All show much smaller and more decorously behaved groups than the wedding parties.

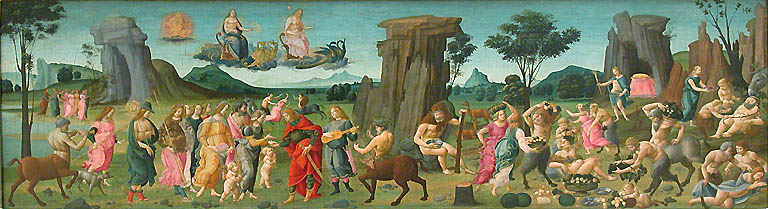
Cassone panel by Bartolomeo di Giovanni, 1490s, with the story of Priapus and Lotis at bottom right corner

== Italian Renaissance ==
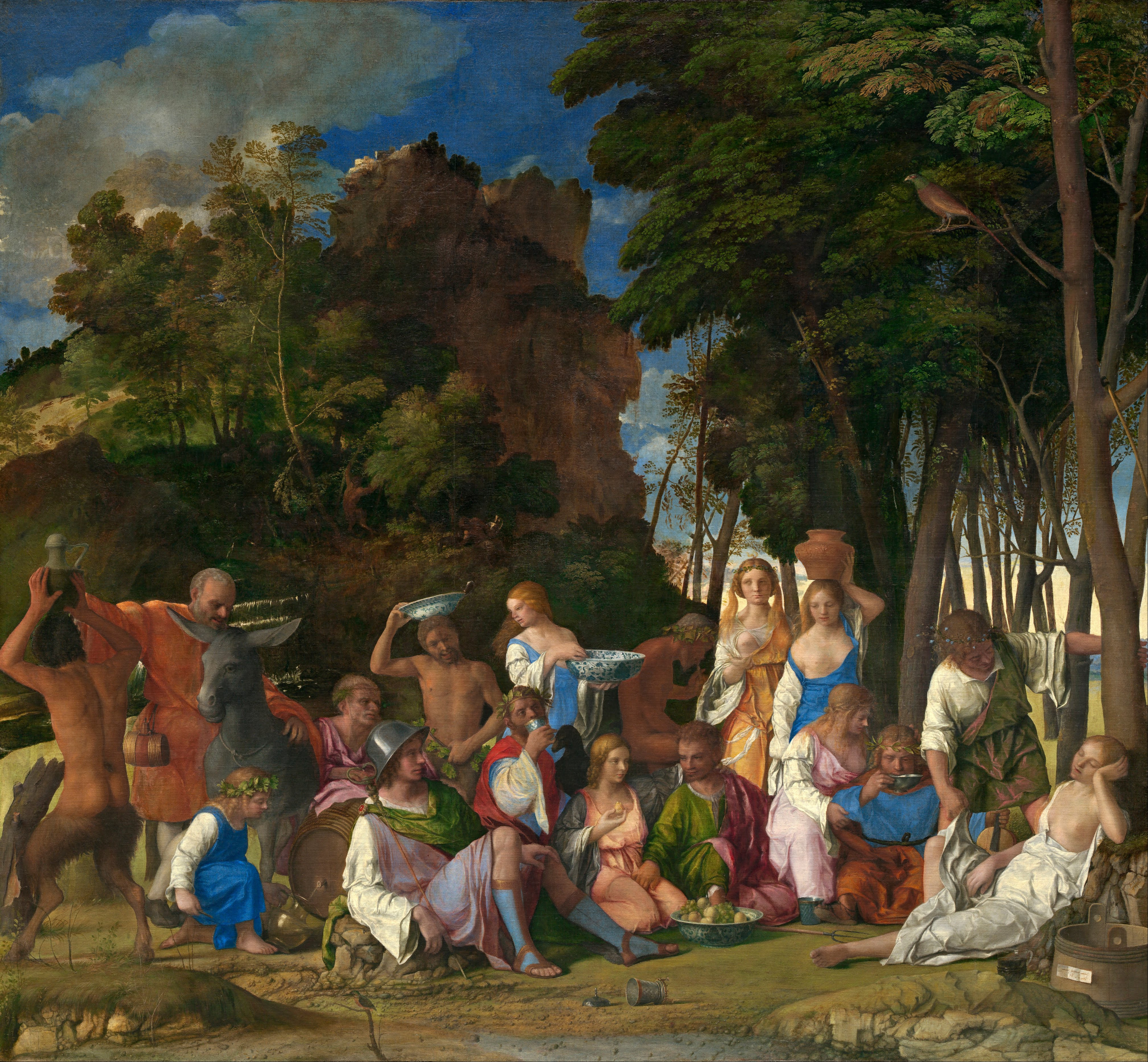
The Feast of the Gods, Giovanni Bellini and Titian (1514–1529), also with Priapus and Lotis, also bottom right

One of the earliest depictions is a cassone panel by Bartolomeo di Giovanni from the 1490s (Louvre, illustrated); this is paired with a panel of the Procession of Thetis, another common way of depicting a wedding; artists were unsure what form an actual Olympian wedding ceremony might have taken. A more sophisticated but similar depiction of a rustic picnic eaten on the ground, is The Feast of the Gods by Giovanni Bellini (1514), later changed by Titian (to 1529), a large and important painting; both show the story of Priapus and Lotis.

Two major frescos from the end of the High Renaissance showed the wedding banquet of Cupid and Psyche: Raphael's central panel in the "Loggia of Psyche" at the Villa Farnesina in Rome, and Giulio Romano's wall panel in the Palazzo Te in Mantua. Both of these became very well-known through print versions, often freely adapting the compositions, and inspired a wide range of versions in drawings and media of the decorative arts such as majolica, painted Limoges enamel and pastiglia. Giulio's version seems to show the preparations rather than the feast itself, and only a few of the invited gods have so far arrived. But it is highly atmospheric and its dispersal of the figures across a large setting was to recur in many later depictions. Both frescos showed a good proportion of the participants nude, or almost so, reflecting the practice of recent decades in mythological paintings. The Fête champêtre of Titian (or Giorgione) may represent a mythological subject, if not a feast then at least a picnic of the gods.

Around the mid-century Taddeo Zuccari did the Wedding of Bacchus and Ariadne in fresco in the Villa Giulia, Rome, and in northern Europe Francesco Primaticcio painted that of Peleus and Thetis in a mythological series in the ballroom of the Palace of Fontainebleau. Frans Floris painted a monumental feast in oil (c. 1550, Antwerp), nearly two metres across, as well as a Feast of the Seagods (1561, Stockholm).

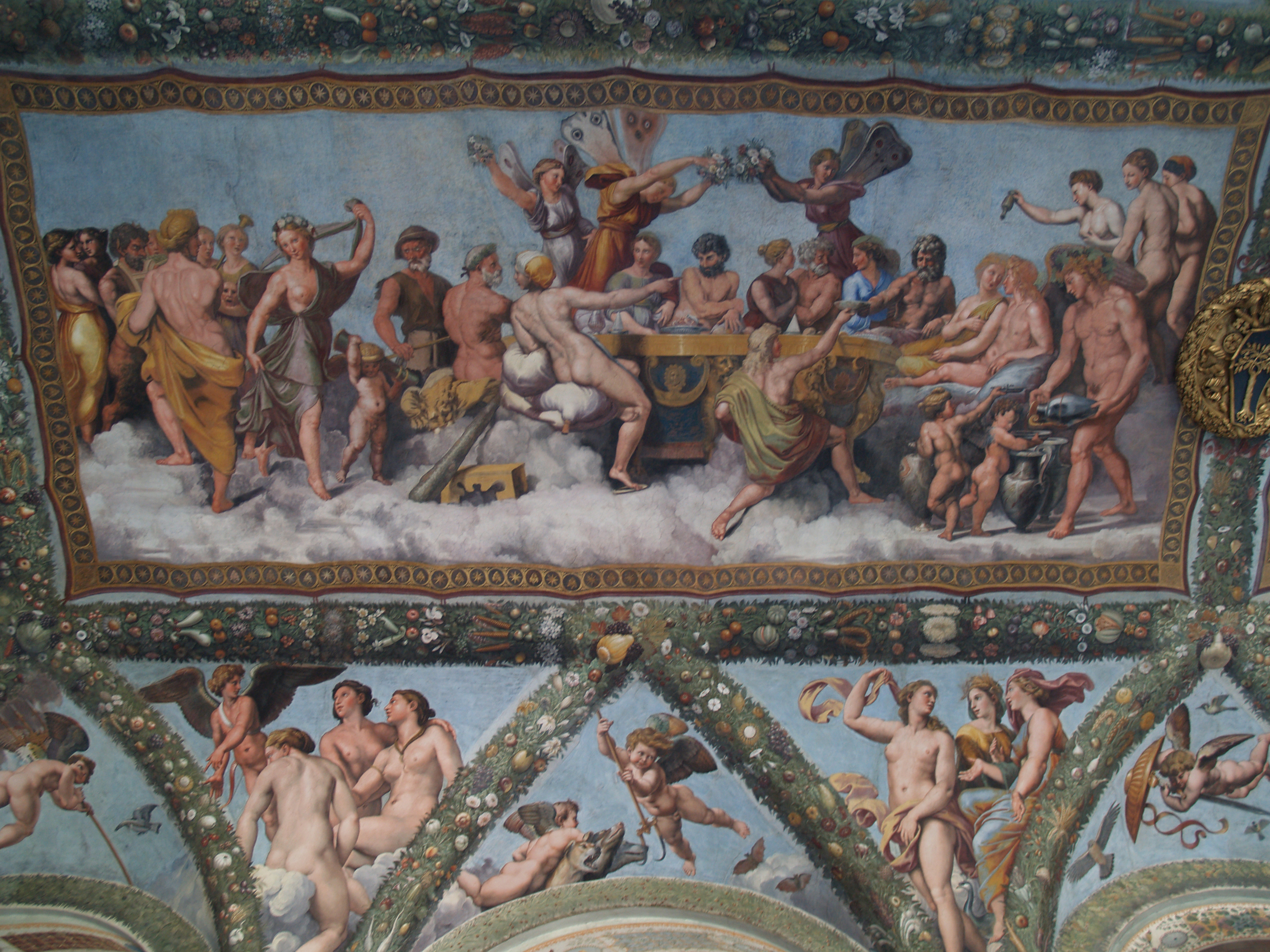
Raphael's panel in the Loggia of Psyche at the Villa Farnesina, Cupid and Psyche

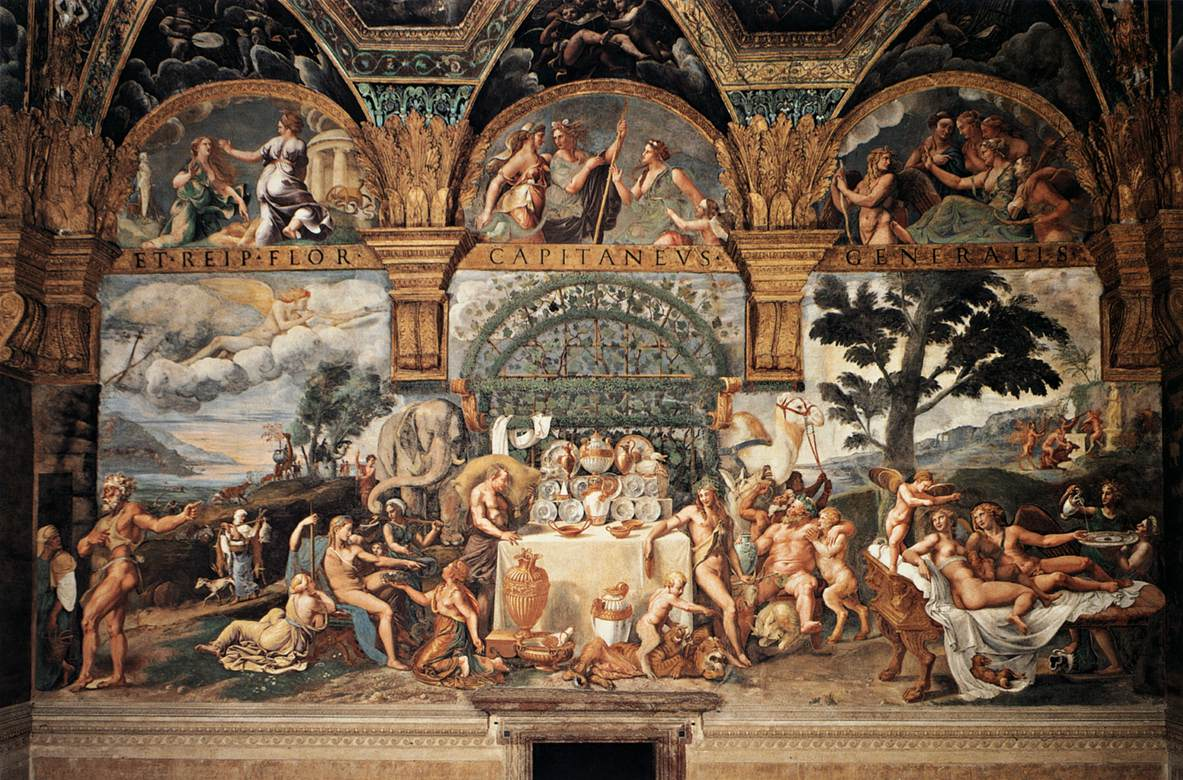
Giulio Romano, Palazzo Te, Mantua, Cupid and Psyche

Frans Floris, c. 1550, no specific occasion

== Northern Mannerism ==
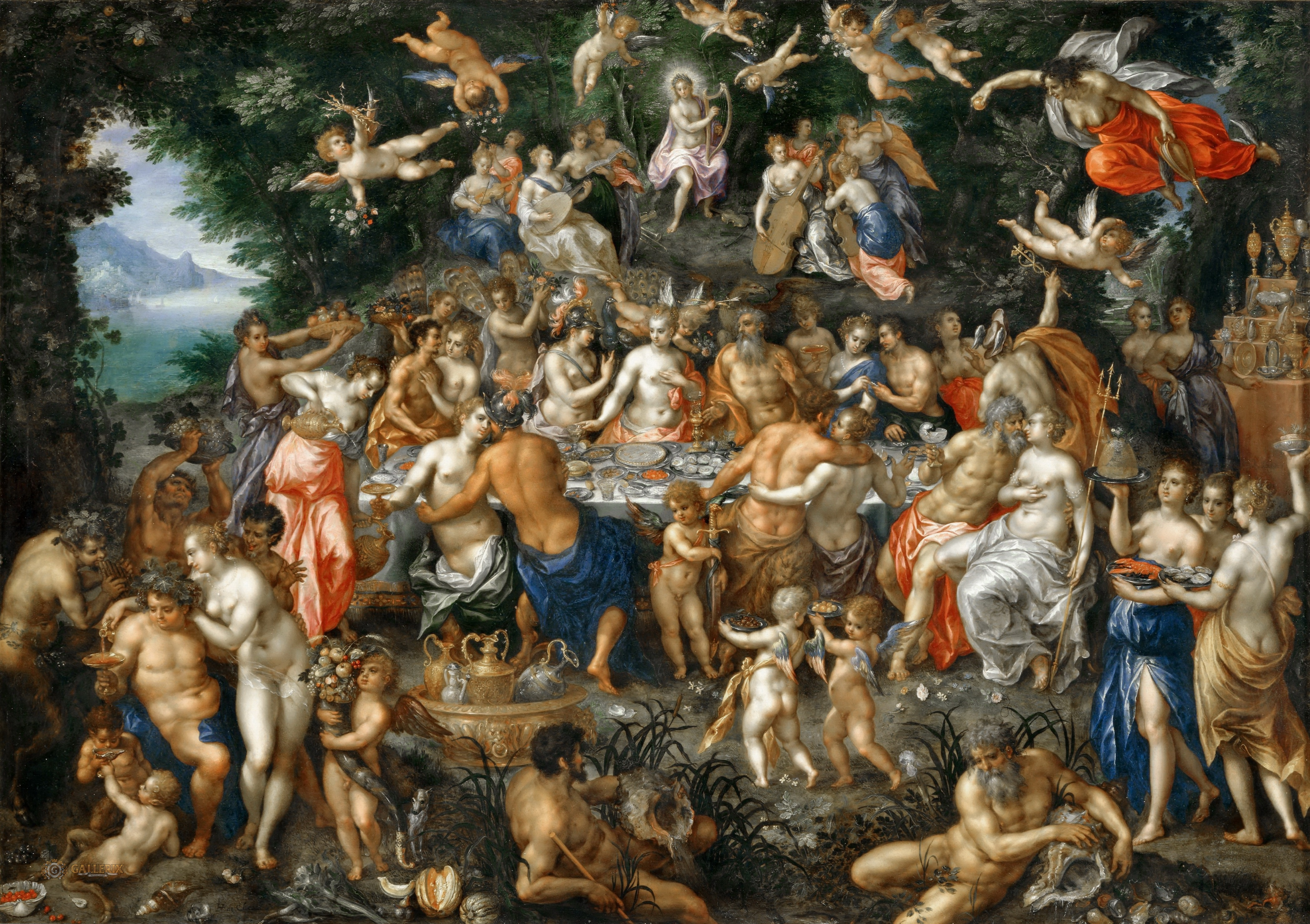
Hendrik de Clerck, 1606–1609, on copper, 54 cm × 76 cm (21 in × 30 in), Thetis and Peleus, with Eris airborne at top right

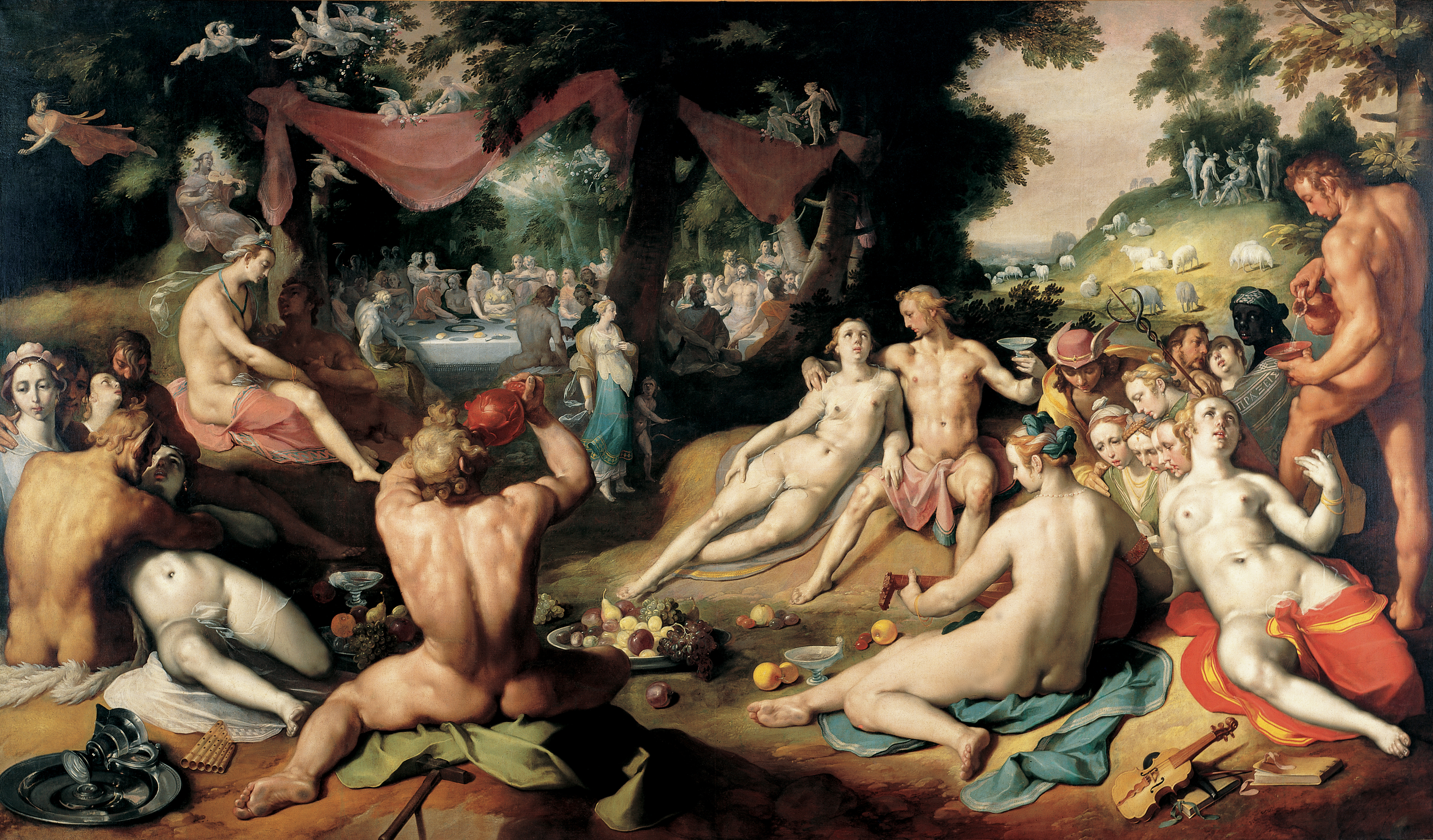
Cornelis Cornelisz. van Haarlem, on canvas, 1593, 246 cm × 419 cm (97 in × 165 in), Peleus and Thetis, with the Judgement of Paris on the hill behind, and Mercury and the goddesses inspecting the golden apple at right

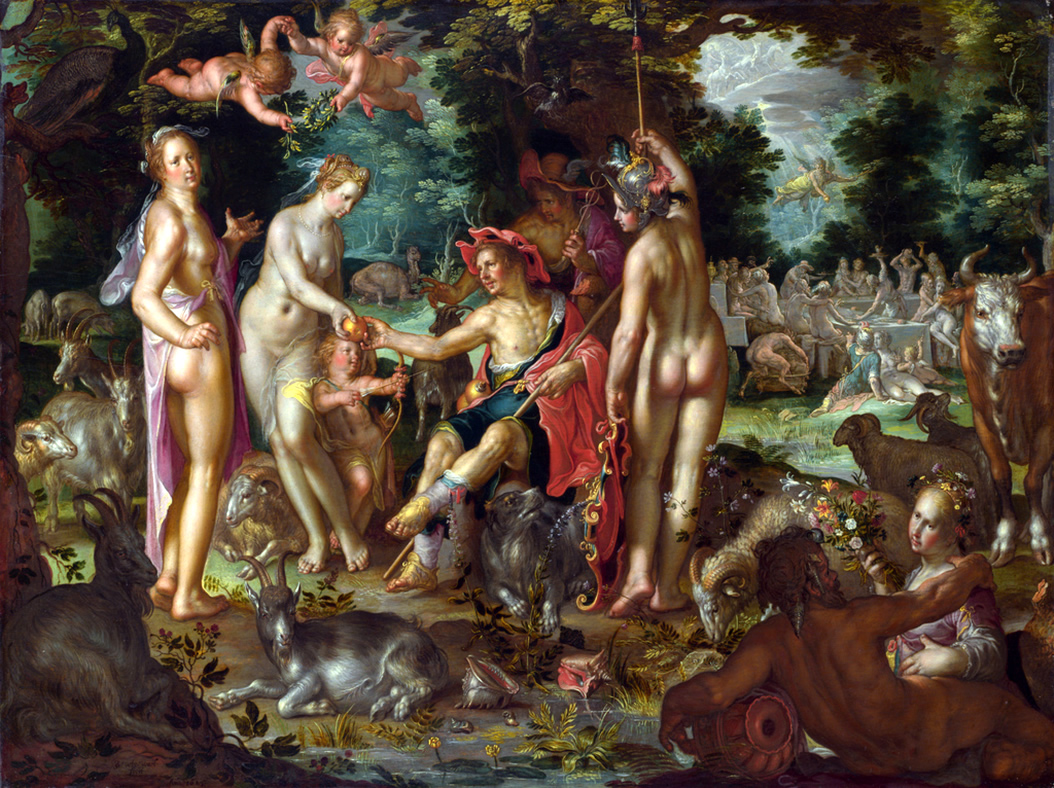
The Judgment of Paris by Joachim Wtewael (1615), wood, 60 cm × 93 cm (24 in × 37 in), with the wedding in the background, including Eris overhead with the golden apple

The revival of interest in the subject some decades later in Northern Mannerism seems to spring from a large engraving of 1587 by Hendrik Goltzius in Haarlem of a drawing by Bartholomeus Spranger (now Rijksmuseum) that Karel van Mander had brought back from Prague, where Spranger was court painter to Rudolf II. The Feast of the Gods at the Marriage of Cupid and Psyche was so large, at 16 7/8 × 33 5/8 in. (43 × 85.4 cm), that it was printed from three different plates. Over 80 figures are shown, placed up in the clouds over a world landscape that can be glimpsed below. The composition borrows from both Raphael and Giulio Romano's versions.

Over the next thirty years or so a number of Netherlandish artists painted the subject, usually in small cabinet paintings, often on copper, although The Wedding of Peleus and Thetis by Cornelis Cornelisz. van Haarlem was enormous at over four metres wide, a commission in 1593 from the Stadtholder Maurice, Prince of Orange for his palace, and Jacob Jordaens' The Golden Apple of Discord (1633, from an oil sketch by Rubens) is also a monumental treatment. Painters who returned to the subject several times include in particular Hendrick van Balen, who was known above all for these subjects, and also Joachim Wtewael, Cornelis van Haarlem, Cornelis van Poelenburch, and Abraham Bloemaert.

Over the same period these same painters, later followed by Rubens, produced many depictions of Sine Cerere et Baccho friget Venus ("Without Ceres and Bacchus, Venus freezes", meaning that love needs food and wine to thrive), a proverb derived from the emblem books, which showed just Ceres, Bacchus, Venus and Cupid picnicking on the ground in most early versions, or seated at a table in some later ones. It has been suggested that the concentration of images by the Haarlem Mannerists reflects the patronage of the powerful brewers of Haarlem.

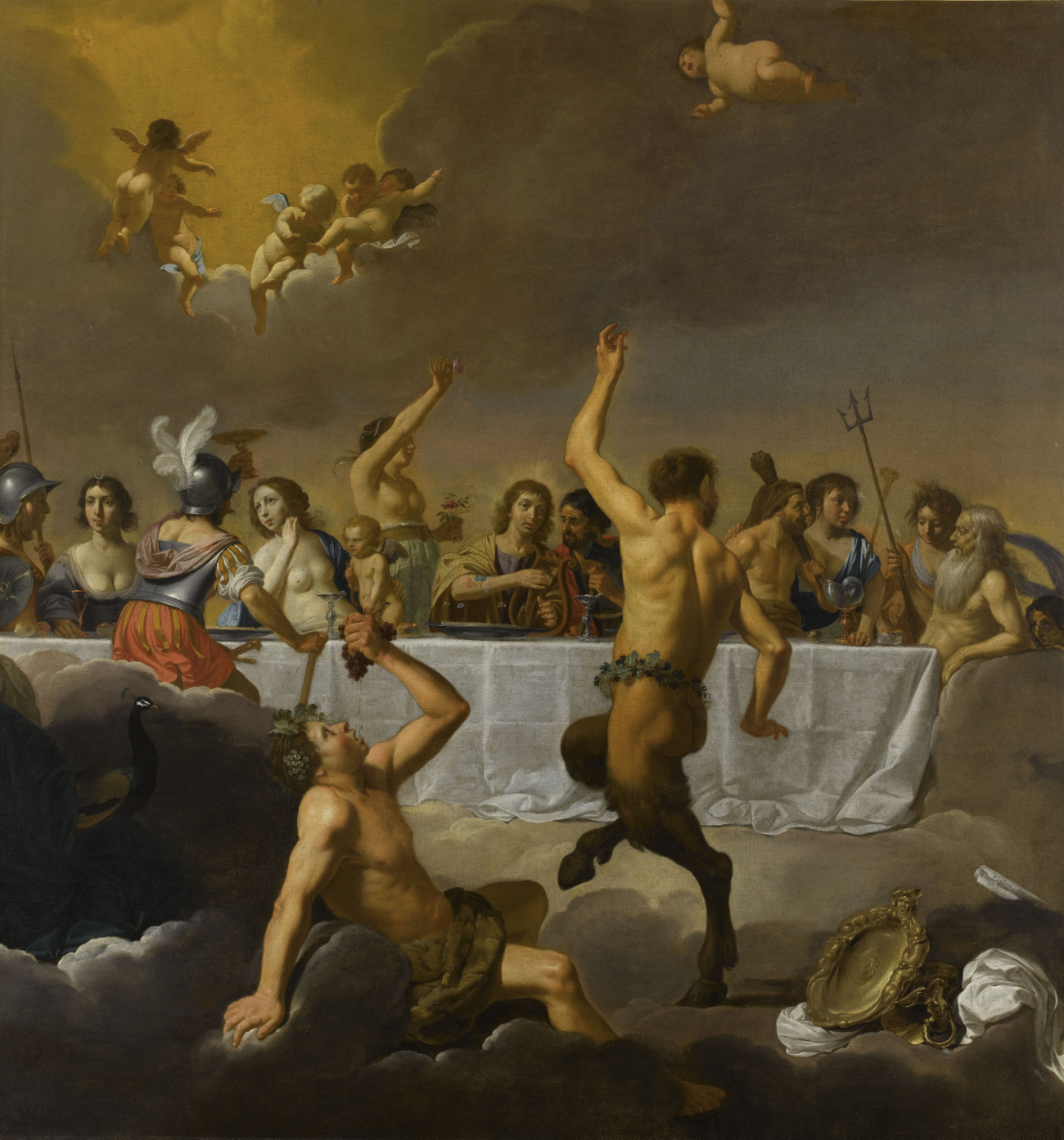
Le Festin des Dieux by Jan van Bijlert (the left-hand end is lost)

Le Festin des Dieux was painted by Jan van Bijlert between 1635 and 1640.

== Context ==
Both the weddings of Cupid and Psyche and that of Peleus and Thetis were common subjects in antiquity, going back to Greek black-figure vase painting. The latter was perhaps shown in the Roman cameo glass Portland Vase. However such depictions rarely show the wedding feast, preferring the ceremony or processions to it.

The earlier paintings may owe something to entertainments alla antica such as those of the Compagnia della Cassuola ("Company of the Shovel") mentioned by Vasari, where a social confraternity in Florence including artists such as Giovanni Francesco Rustici and Andrea del Sarto held elaborate dinners which might include the attendees dressing as classical gods and re-enacting episodes from mythology. Raphael and Giulio's frescos decorated spaces used for lavish entertaining that might bear comparison with Olympian hospitality; the previous century Marsilio Ficino had written a thank-you letter to Lorenzo de' Medici that made just that comparison.

The later paintings can also be seen in the context of the wider interest in "company scenes" of social occasions in Netherlandish art at the start of the 17th century, expressed in the new genre subject of the merry company, and its "gallant" and "elegant" variations, as well as the continuation of Pieter Bruegel the Elder's scenes of peasant life by his son Jan and others. The feasts formed a division of the class of small-scale mythological paintings, in which the interest of the figures is very often shared with landscape or still life elements. Both of these figure in many feasts, but the emphasis is on a generous range of nude figures, displaying a variety of complicated poses that display the artist's virtuosity.

Small groups of non-divine revellers in similar arcadian landscape settings are called bacchanals, and are even more common in art. Other subjects that were popular at the same period showed the entertainment of classical gods by humans, in the story of Baucis and Philemon and other tales. The Triumph of Bacchus (Los borrachos, 1628) by Diego Velázquez, in the Museo del Prado, is a famous example of the subject of Bacchus drinking with humans.

== Later works ==
The New Palace at Potsdam in Berlin has a ceiling painting in the Marmorsaal ("Marble Hall") depicting the Feast of the Gods on Olympus (1769) by the Neoclassical painter Amédée van Loo. Romantic Nationalism extended the range of gods that might be depicted to the Norse gods. In 1863 the Peredvizhniki ("Wanderers") group of progressive artists was founded after several left the Imperial Academy of Arts in Saint Petersburg in disgust after the subject set for the annual Gold Medal contest (the Russian equivalent of the Prix de Rome) was "The Feast of Odin in Valhalla", which they thought both un-Russian and of no social relevance. Later paintings, particularly in England, sometimes depicted fairy scenes of a somewhat similar types, such as The Quarrel of Oberon and Titania (1849) and its matching Reconciliation, by Sir Joseph Noel Paton.
