= Dirck van der Lisse =

Dutch painter (1607–1669)

Dirck van der Lisse (6 August 1607, The Hague - buried 31 January 1669, The Hague) was a Dutch Golden Age painter.

== Biography ==
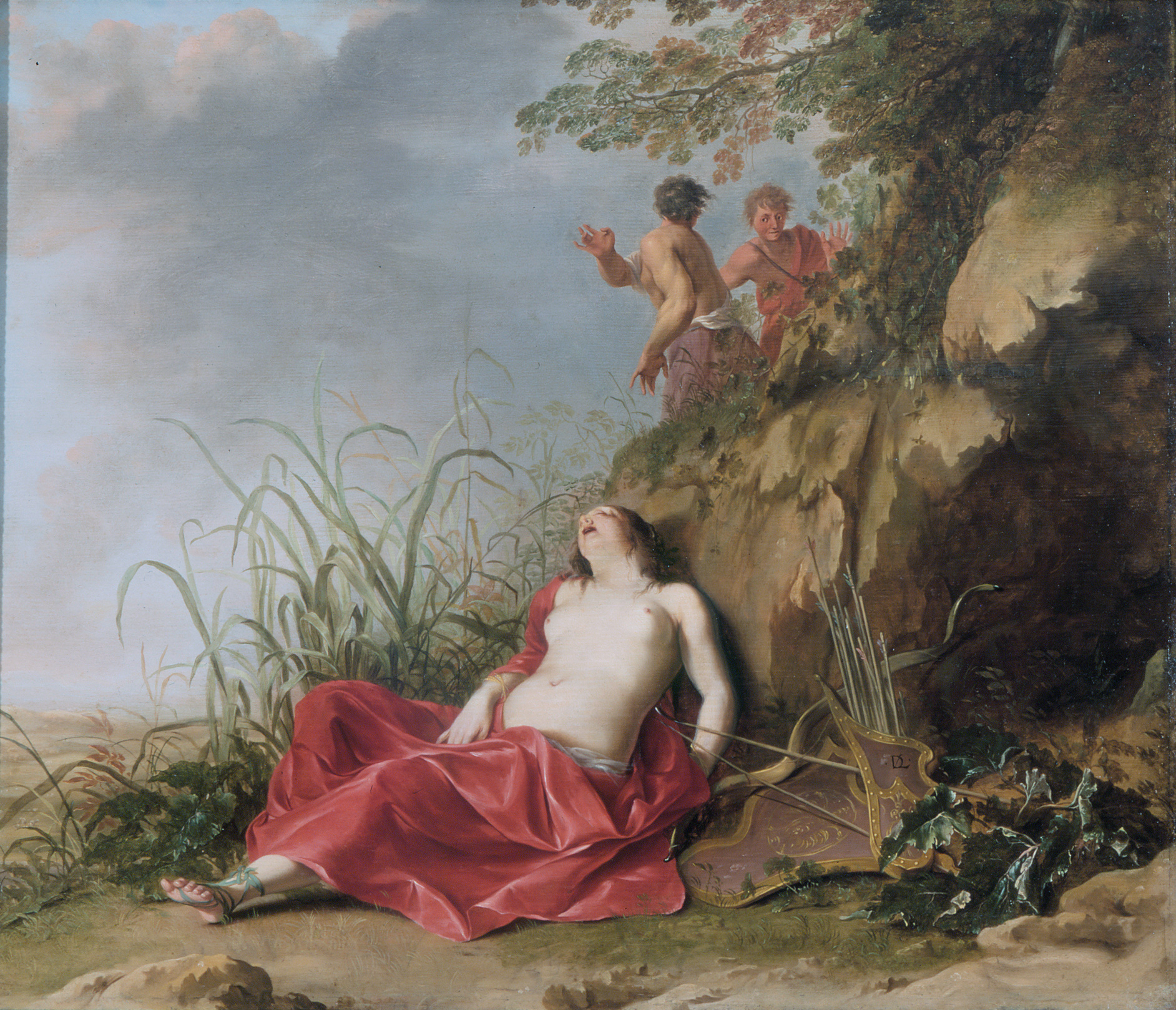
Sleeping nymf by Van der Lisse

Van der Lisse was born in The Hague. He learned to paint from Cornelis van Poelenburch, and later lived in Utrecht from 1626, alternating between Utrecht and The Hague between 1635 and 1640. He married Petronella van der Hove in 1639 in the Hague, and in 1640 he moved to Utrecht, and in 1642 he moved to Amsterdam, the same year his second son was born, who died in infancy. In 1644 he became a member of the Hague painter's guild (that contained not only painters, but glass makers, chair makers, and book binders, according to Houbraken), and in 1656, he became a city magistrate and helped form the Confrerie Pictura. In 1659-1669 he was mayor of the Hague.

== Works ==
He has been called "Van Poelenburch's best pupil", but Houbraken did not mention his teacher at all, and in Van Poelenburch's biography he claimed that his best pupil was "Joan vander Lis", not Dirk vander Lis. The RKD mentions both Dirck van der Lisse and Jan van der Lijs as being pupils of Van Poelenburch. His early paintings were frequently landscapes with nymphs, coming close to the style his master used around 1630, and even sometimes being mistaken for Van Poelenburch's at auctions. However, many displayed a distinctive style, which consisted of emptier, more horizontal compositions. In 1635, he was one of four painters commissioned to work on the Pastor Fido of Frederick Henry, Prince of Orange, painting one of the main scenes and one of the four subsidiary landscapes. Later in his career, as was common among his contemporaries, he largely abandoned landscapes in favor of the more lucrative business of portrait painting. Despite his apparent success as a painter, his paintings are relatively uncommon in inventories and auction catalogues before about 1640.

He is known for Italianate landscapes and historical allegories of the "Van Poelenburch School". Works previously attributed to Dirck van der Lisse are currently attributed to Van Poelenburch, Herman Saftleven, Emanuel de Witte, Daniel Vertangen, Willem de Heusch and Moyses van Wtenbrouck. Later in life, when he became involved in guild and municipal politics in The Hague, he probably did not paint much in this latter ten years of his life.
