= The Triumph of Bacchus =

Painting by Diego Velázquez

The Triumph of Bacchus or Los borrachos
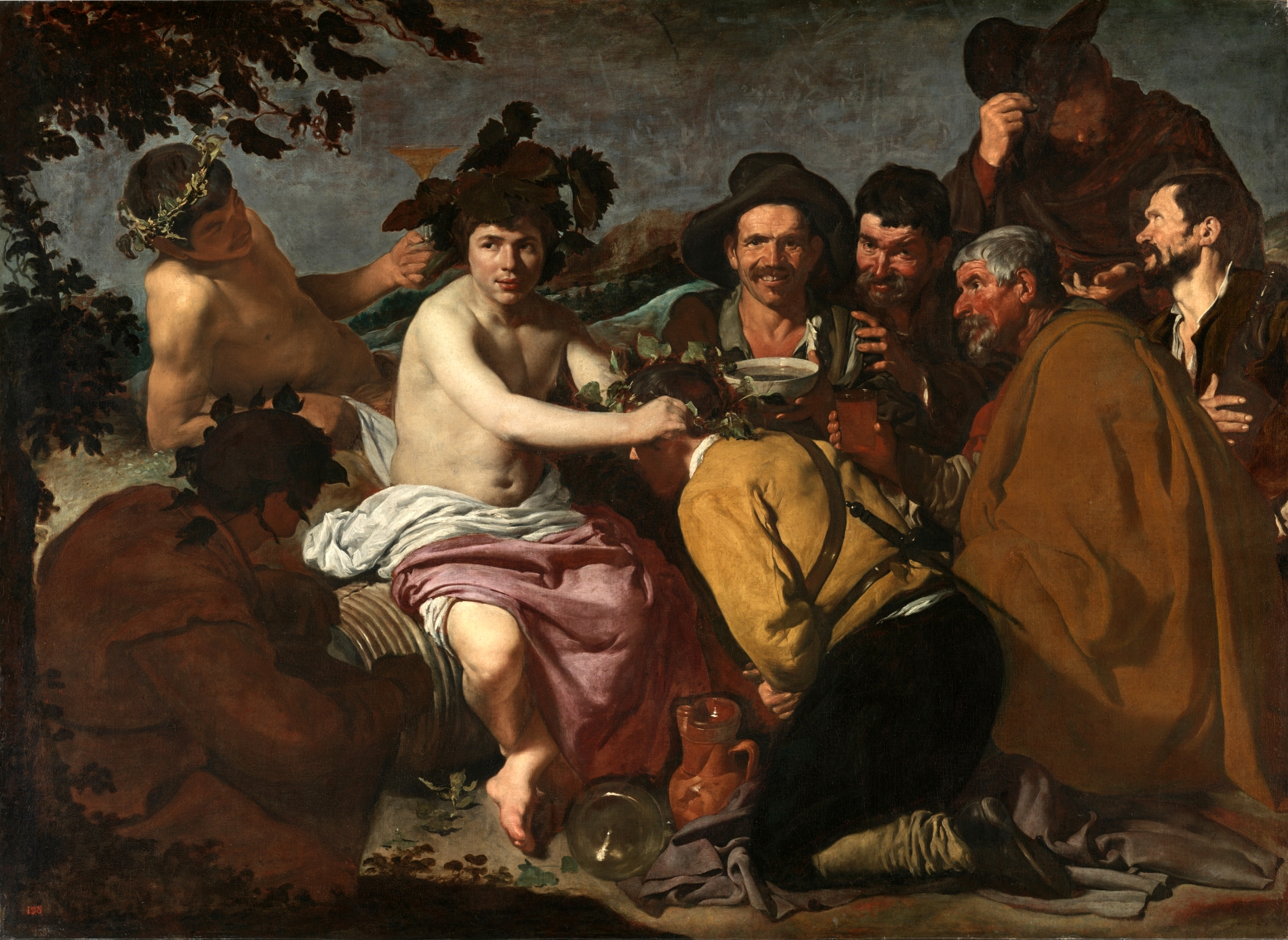
- Artist: Diego Velázquez
- Year: 1628–1629
- Medium: Oil on canvas
- Dimensions: 165 cm × 225 cm (65 in × 89 in)
- Location: Museo del Prado; Madrid

The Triumph of Bacchus (Greek: Ο Θρίαμβος του Βάκχου) is a painting by Diego Velázquez, now in the Museo del Prado, in Madrid. It is popularly known as Los borrachos or The Drinkers (also The Drunks).

Velázquez painted The Triumph of Bacchus after arriving in Madrid from Seville and just before his voyage to Italy. The work was painted for Philip IV, who paid Velázquez 100 ducats for it. The painting shows Bacchus surrounded by drunks. In Madrid, Velázquez was able to study the king's collection of Italian paintings and was no doubt struck by the nudity in many paintings as well as the treatment of mythological subjects.

The Triumph of Bacchus has been described as the masterpiece of Velázquez's 1620s paintings.

== Description ==
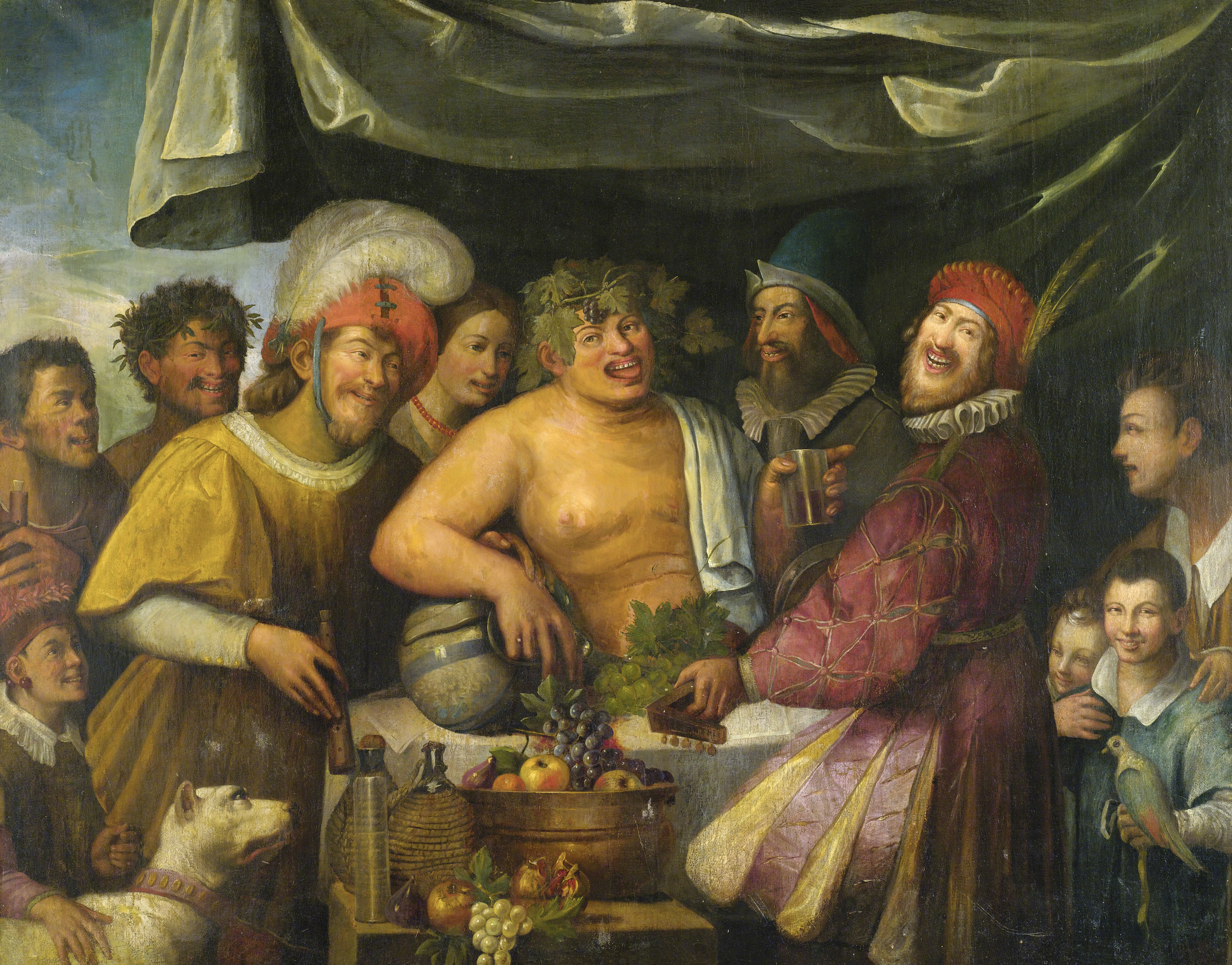
Niccolò Frangipane (d. 1597, attributed to) Bacchanal. Here too Bacchus has brought a single companion from the world of mythology.

In the work, Bacchus is represented as a person at the center of a small celebration, but his skin is paler than that of his companions, rendering him more easily recognizable. Unusually, the rest of the group, apart from the figure naked to the waist behind the god, are in the contemporary costume of poor people in 17th-century Spain. The work represents Bacchus as the god who rewards or gifts men with wine, temporarily releasing them from their problems. In Baroque literature, Bacchus was considered an allegory of the liberation of man from the slavery of daily life.

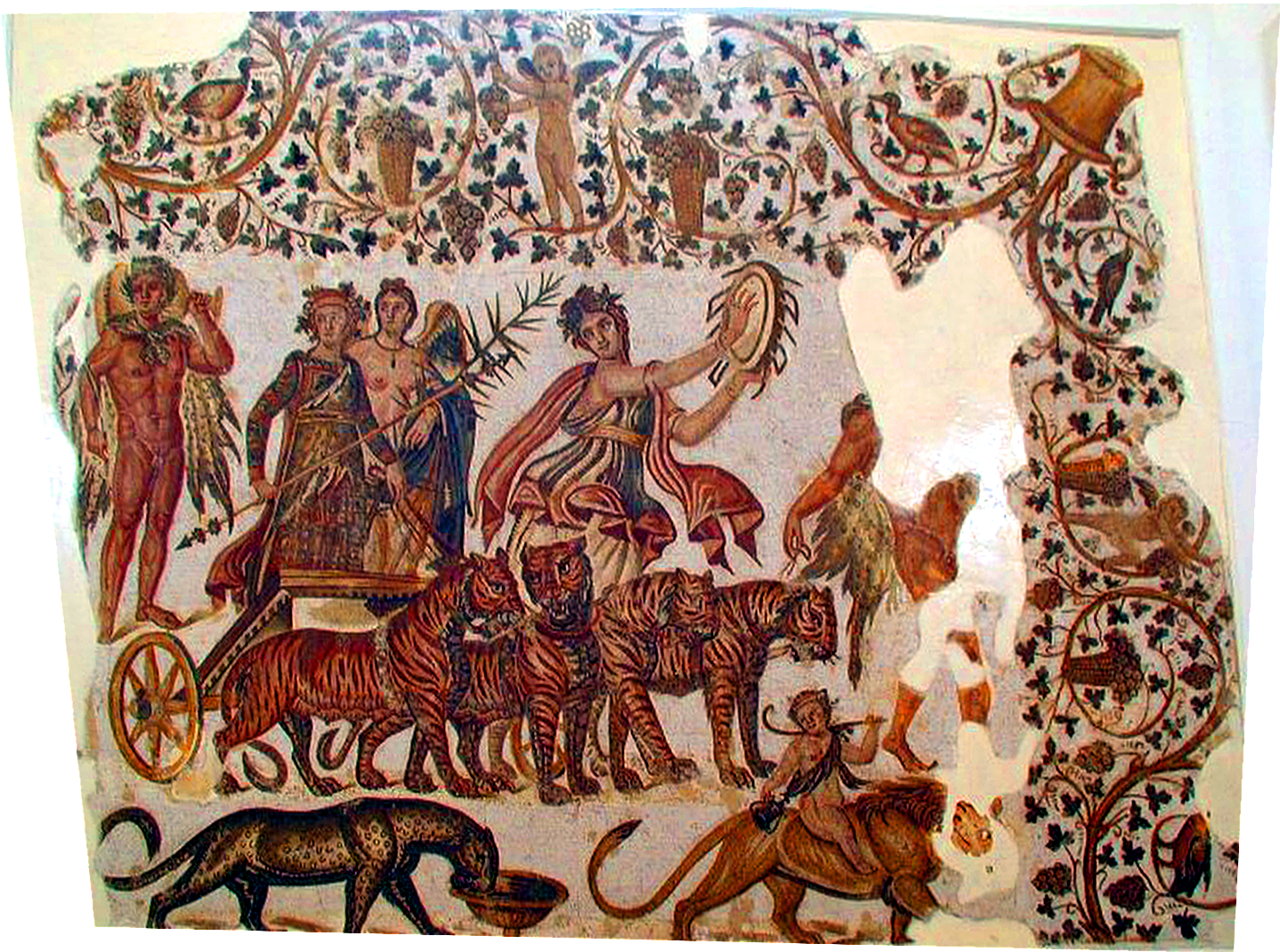
The Triumph of Bacchus, a Roman mosaic from Africa Proconsolaris, dated 3rd century AD, now in the Sousse Archaeological Museum, Tunisia

The scene can be divided in two halves. On the left, there is the very luminous Bacchus figure, his dominant but relaxed pose somewhat reminiscent of that of Christ in many Last Judgement scenes, who is often shown seated and naked to the waist. Bacchus and the character behind him are represented in the traditional loose robes used for depictions of classical myth. The idealization of the god's face is highlighted by the clear light which illuminates him in a more classicist style. The right side, however, presents some drunkards, men of the streets that invite us to join their party, with a very Spanish atmosphere similar to José de Ribera in style. There is no idealization present in their large and worn-out faces, though the figure kneeling in front of the god is younger and better dressed than the others, with a sword and tall boots. The light which illuminates Bacchus is absent on this side; the figures are shown with chiaroscuro and have much darker skin.

In this work, Velázquez adopted a realist treatment of a mythological subject, a tendency he would pursue further during the following years.

There are various elements of naturalism in this work, such as the bottle and pitcher which appear on the ground close to the god's feet; Velázquez employed the contrast of the god's bright body to lend relief and texture to the bottle and pitcher, creating something akin to a still life. These jars are very similar to the ones which appear in paintings made by Velázquez during his period in Seville, and the combination of still life elements of naturalistic genre figures relates to the bodegon subjects he painted there.

== Influence ==
The Triumph of Bacchus received a number of rather grand and elaborate idealized treatments in Renaissance art, of which Titian's Bacchus and Ariadne, then in the Spanish royal collection, was an imaginative variant. Usually Bacchus was processing in a chariot drawn by leopards, with a retinue of satyrs and revellers, including his guardian Silenus. The use of the title for Velázquez's painting is almost ironic given the very different treatment here.

One inspiration for Velázquez is Caravaggio's treatments of religious subjects combining central figures in traditional iconographical robes with subsidiary figures in contemporary dress, and Ribera's naturalistic portraits of figures from antiquity, sometimes depicted as beggars. Entertainments hosted by Bacchus appear as an occasional subject in art from the Renaissance onwards, as one type of the wider subject of the Feast of the gods in art: around 1550 Taddeo Zuccari painted a large feast at the Wedding of Bacchus and Ariadne in fresco in the Villa Giulia, Rome, Some paintings show Bacchus with revellers in contemporary modern dress, as in the Frangipane illustrated.

== Legacy ==
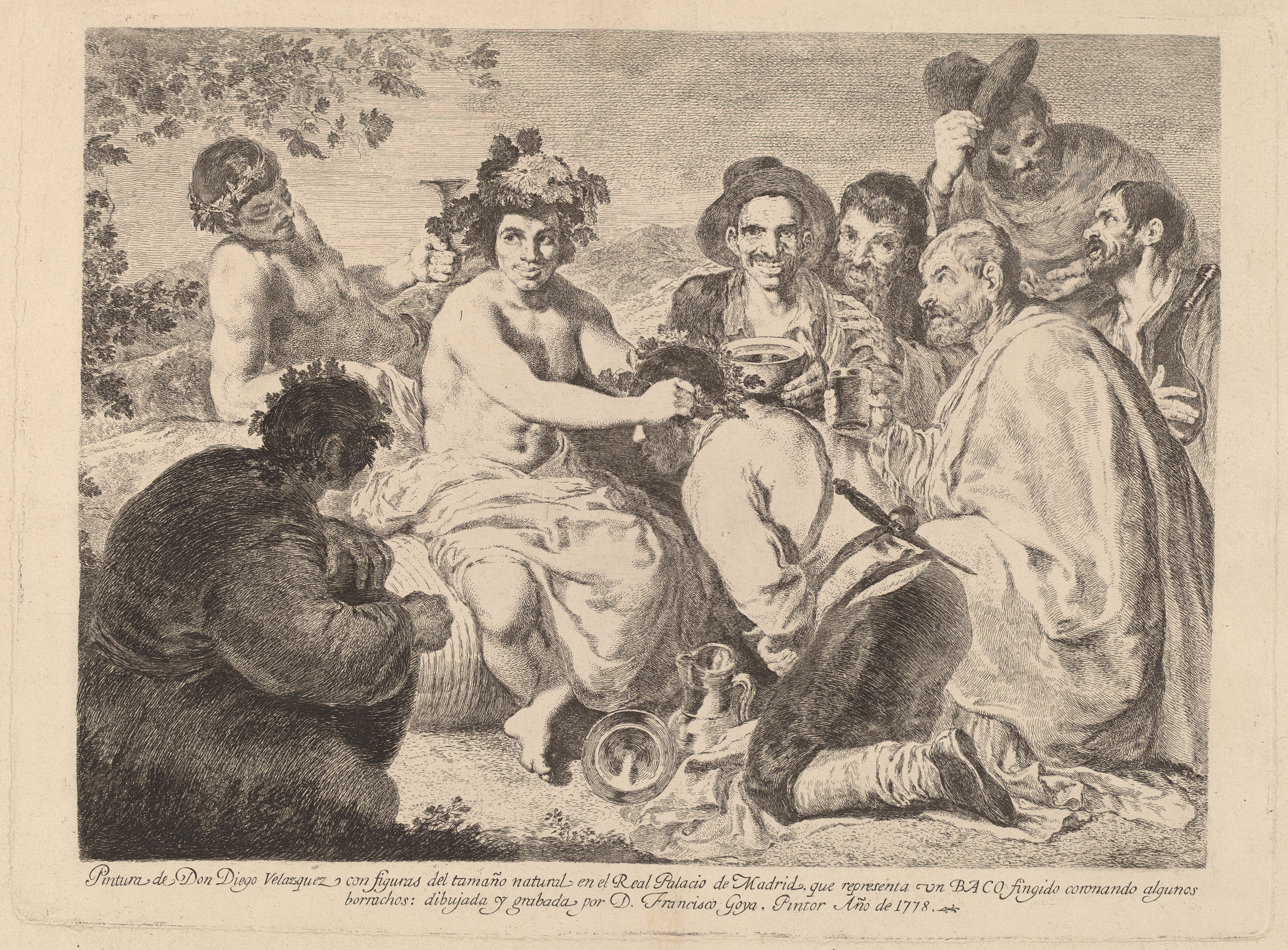
Goya's etching after Velázquez's painting (1778, first edition print held at the National Gallery of Art, Washington)

The Triumph of Bacchus is one of Velázquez's paintings that Francisco de Goya reproduced as an etching in 1778. This engraving was widely distributed and it is known that even Édouard Manet owned a copy. The Print Room of the Museo del Prado holds three impressions from this plate, one from the first edition and two printed in the 20th century, as well as the preparatory drawing.

In the left panel of his triptych La familia informal (1992), Herman Braun-Vega brings together the characters from The Triumph of Bacchus with contemporary figures of modest condition, including a young pregnant mestiza woman. This is one of the means by which he addresses the subject of subsistence economies in which the poorest inhabitants of third world countries live. This triptych is one of five key works for understanding the collection of the Ralli Museum Marbella and was part of the Peru-Spain series he created for the exhibition at the former Museum of Contemporary Art of Madrid in 1992. Another appropriation of The Triumph of Bacchus by Braun-Vega can be found in his 1993 painting Bodegón.

Mark Wallinger argued that The Triumph of Bacchus prefigured Las Meninas and stated, "Velázquez presents us with a complexity of focal points. [...] The look [the two liggers on the left of Bacchus] direct at the viewer slices clean through 350 years in the most disconcerting way. [...] However one might describe them, we are made complicit in the meaning of the work."

== See also ==
- List of works by Diego Velázquez
- Feast of the Gods (art)
