= Jan van Bijlert =

Dutch painter (c. 1597–1671)

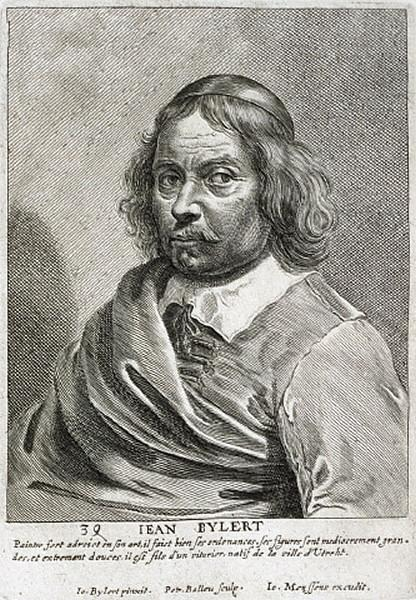
- Jean Bylert, engraving by Pieter de Bailliu after a self-portrait, 1649
- Born: Jan Van Bijlert; 1597; Utrecht
- Died: 1671 (aged 73–74); Utrecht
- Known for: Painting
- Movement: Utrecht Caravaggisti

Jan Hermansz van Bijlert (1597 or 1598 – November 1671) was a Dutch Golden Age painter from Utrecht, one of the Utrecht Caravaggisti whose style was influenced by Caravaggio. He spent some four years in Italy and was one of the founders of the Bentvueghels circle of northern painters in Rome.

== Biography ==
Jan van Bijlert was born in Utrecht, the son of the stained glass worker Herman Beernts van Bijlert. He may have had some training by his father. Subsequently, he became a student of Abraham Bloemaert. Like other painters from Utrecht, he travelled in France and Italy. In 1621 he was, along with Cornelis van Poelenburch and Willem Molijn, a founding member of the circle of Dutch and Flemish artists in Rome known as the Bentvueghels. It was the custom among the Bentvueghels to adopt a nickname. Van Bijlert's nickname was "Aeneas".

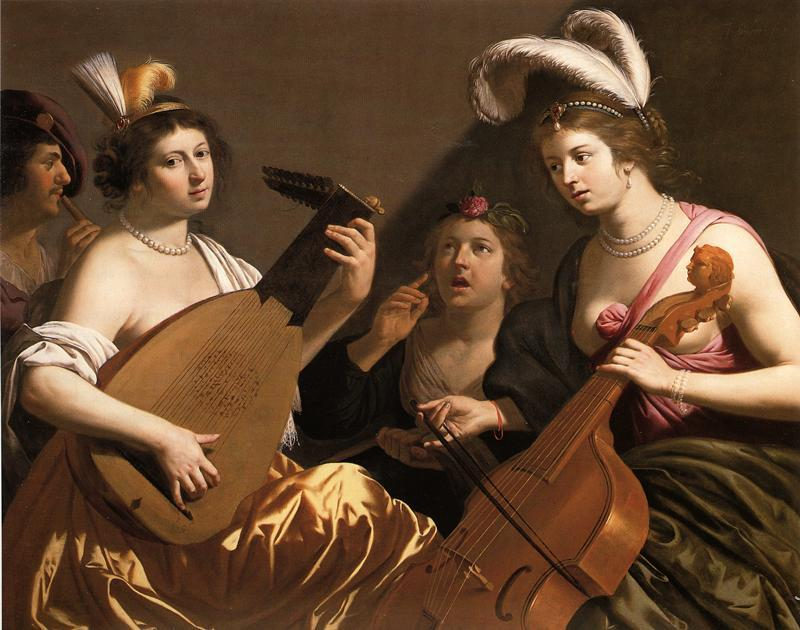
The Concert (1630s)

By 1625, he had returned to Utrecht, where he married and joined the schutterij. In 1630, he became a member of the Utrecht Guild of St. Luke and the Reformed church. From 1632 to 1637 he was active as deacon of the guild, and in 1634 he was appointed regent of the Sint-Jobsgasthuis. In 1639, he helped form a painter's school, the "Schilders-College", where he served as regent. He died in Utrecht.

== Work ==
Van Bijlert was a very prolific painter who left some 200 pictures. Upon his return from Rome he, like other Utrecht artists who had come under the influence of Caravaggio's work, painted in a style derived from that of Caravaggio. These Utrecht artists are referred to as the Utrecht Caravaggisti. The Caravaggesque style of van Bijlert's early paintings shows itself in the use of strong chiaroscuro, the cutting off of the picture plane to create a close-up image and the realism of the representation. Van Bijlert continued to paint in this style throughout the 1620s.

Around 1630, van Bijlert turned to a more classicising style, possibly under the influence of Cornelis van Poelenburgh. His colours became lighter and his subject matter became more elevated such as religious scenes. In the 1630s he also painted compositions with small figures, usually representing genre scenes of brothels or musical gatherings. These works were similar to those of the Utrecht painter Jacob Duck.

Van Bijlert also painted the portraits of eminent citizens of Utrecht such as burgomasters and nobles.

His pupils included Bartram de Fouchier, Ludolf Leendertsz de Jongh, Johannes de Veer, Mattheus Wijtmans, and Abraham Willaerts.

== Gallery ==
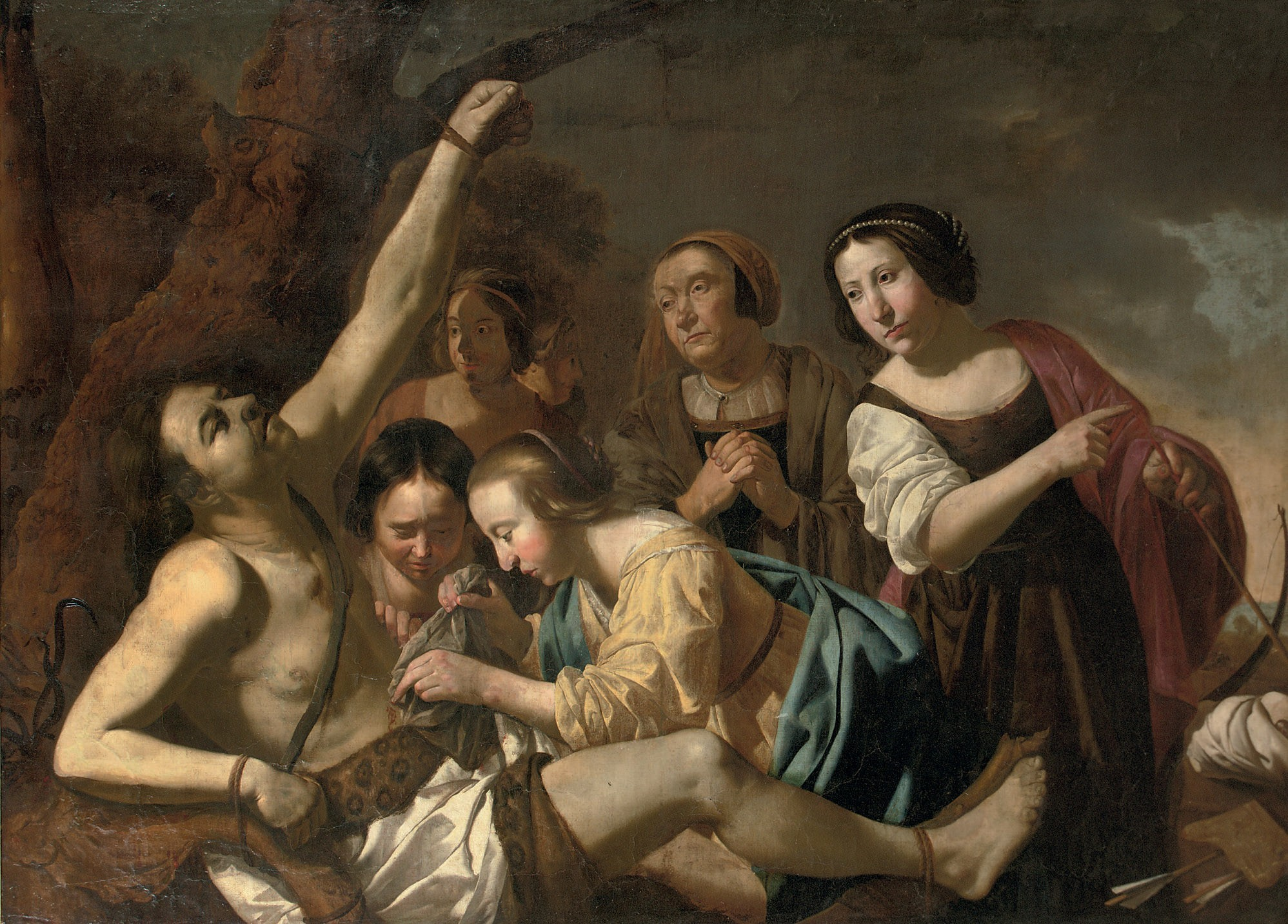
Saint Sebastian Tended by Saint Irene, c. 1620s, (private collection)

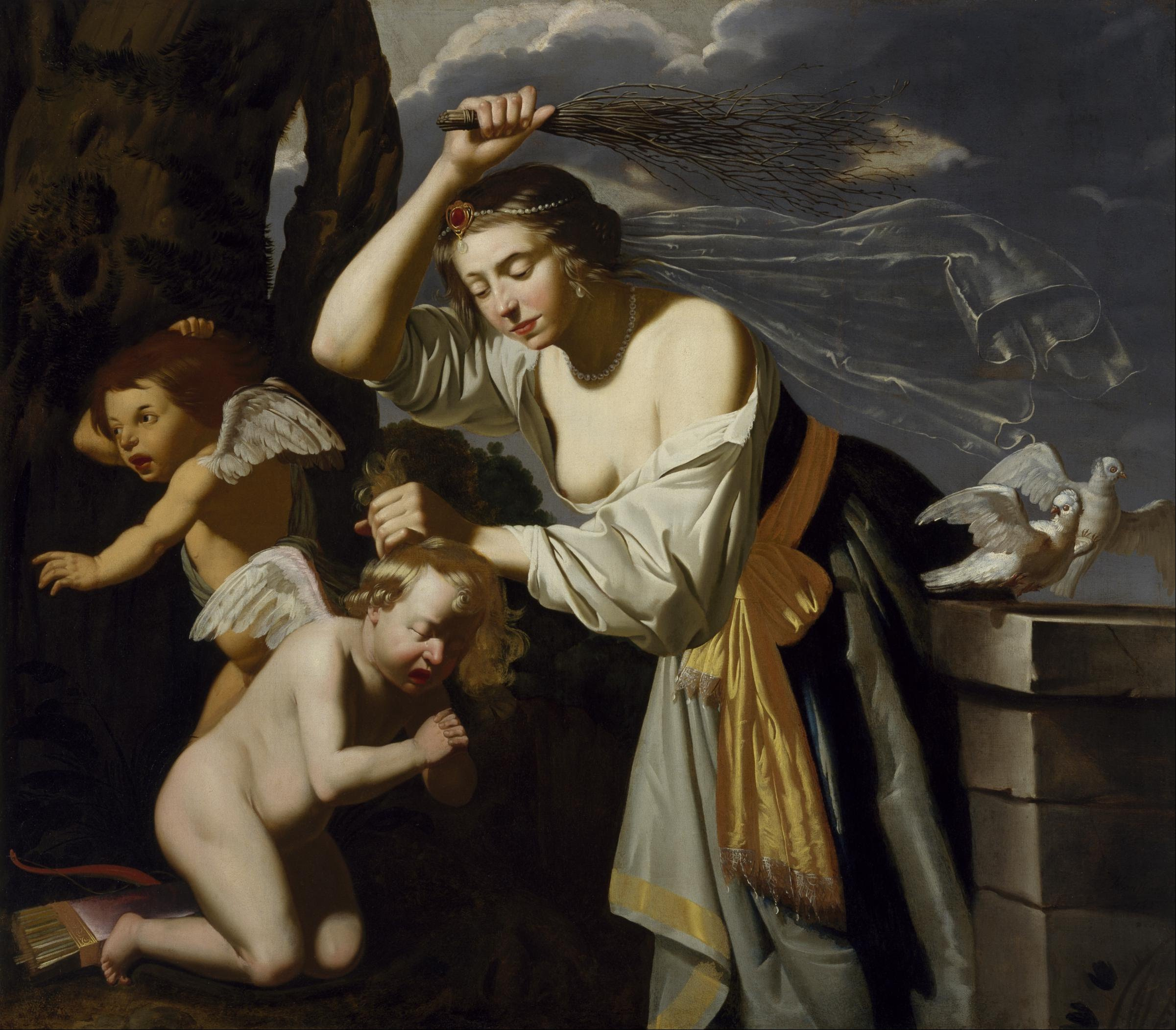
Venus Chastising Cupid

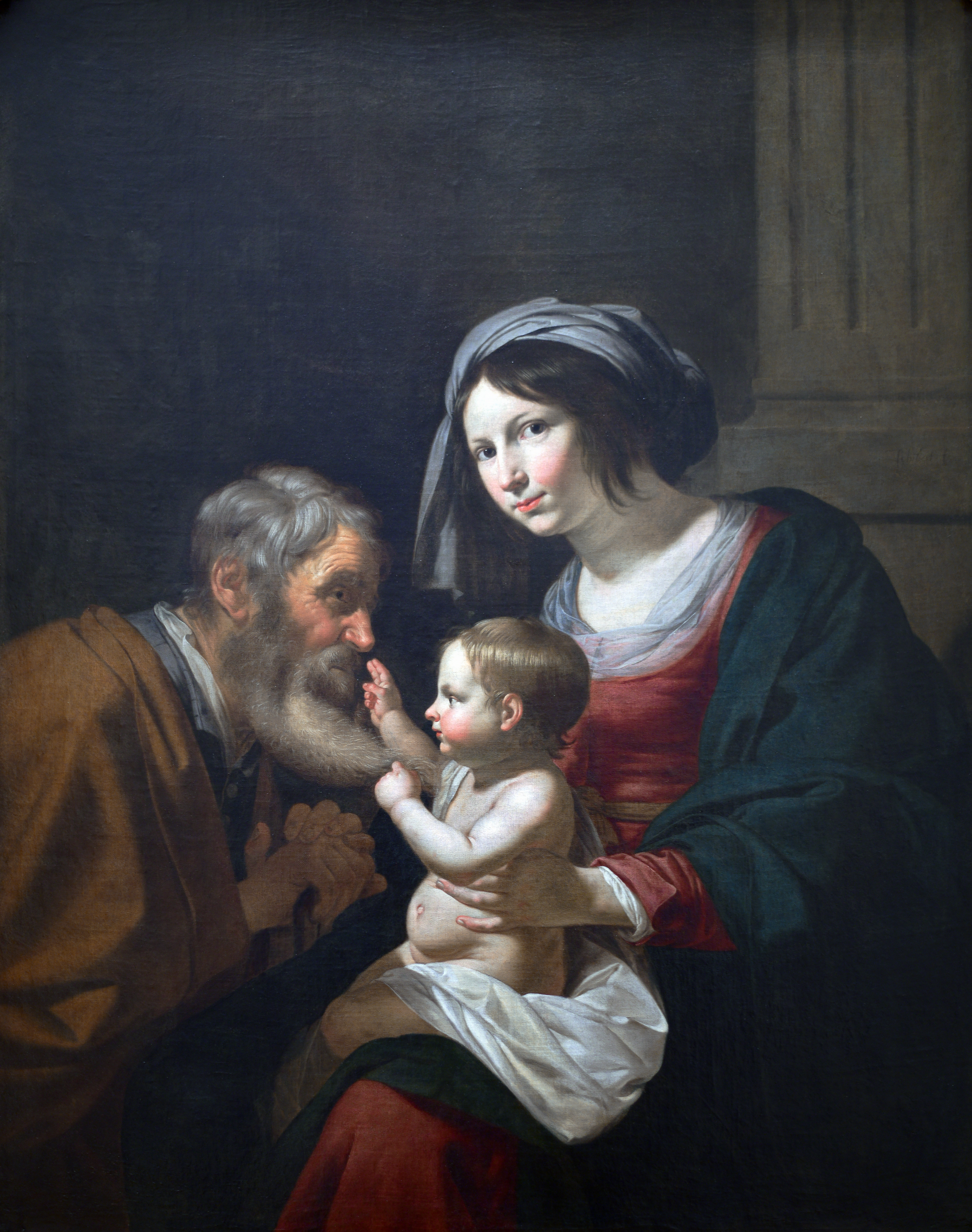
The Holy Family

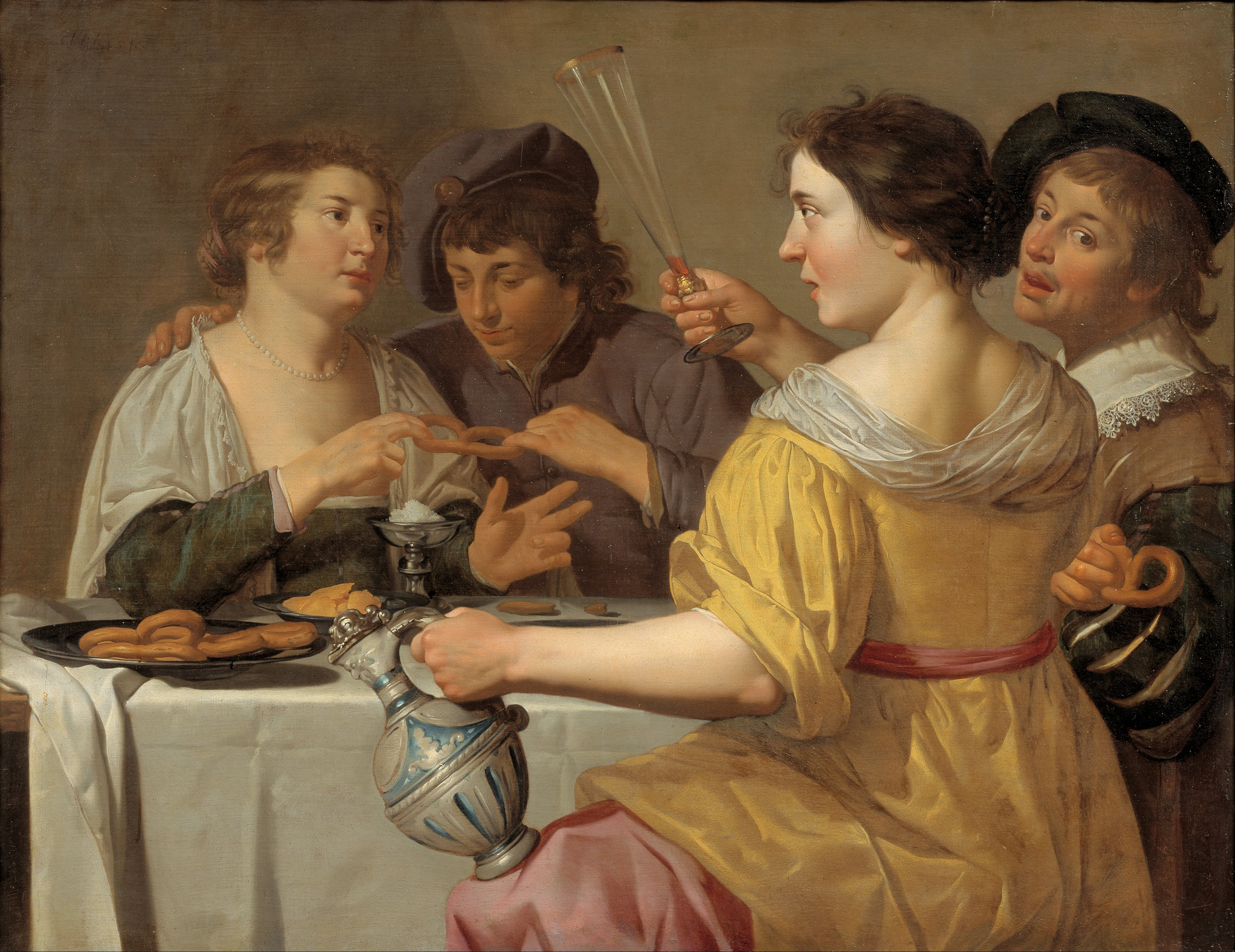
"Pulling of the Pretzel" 1630-1640

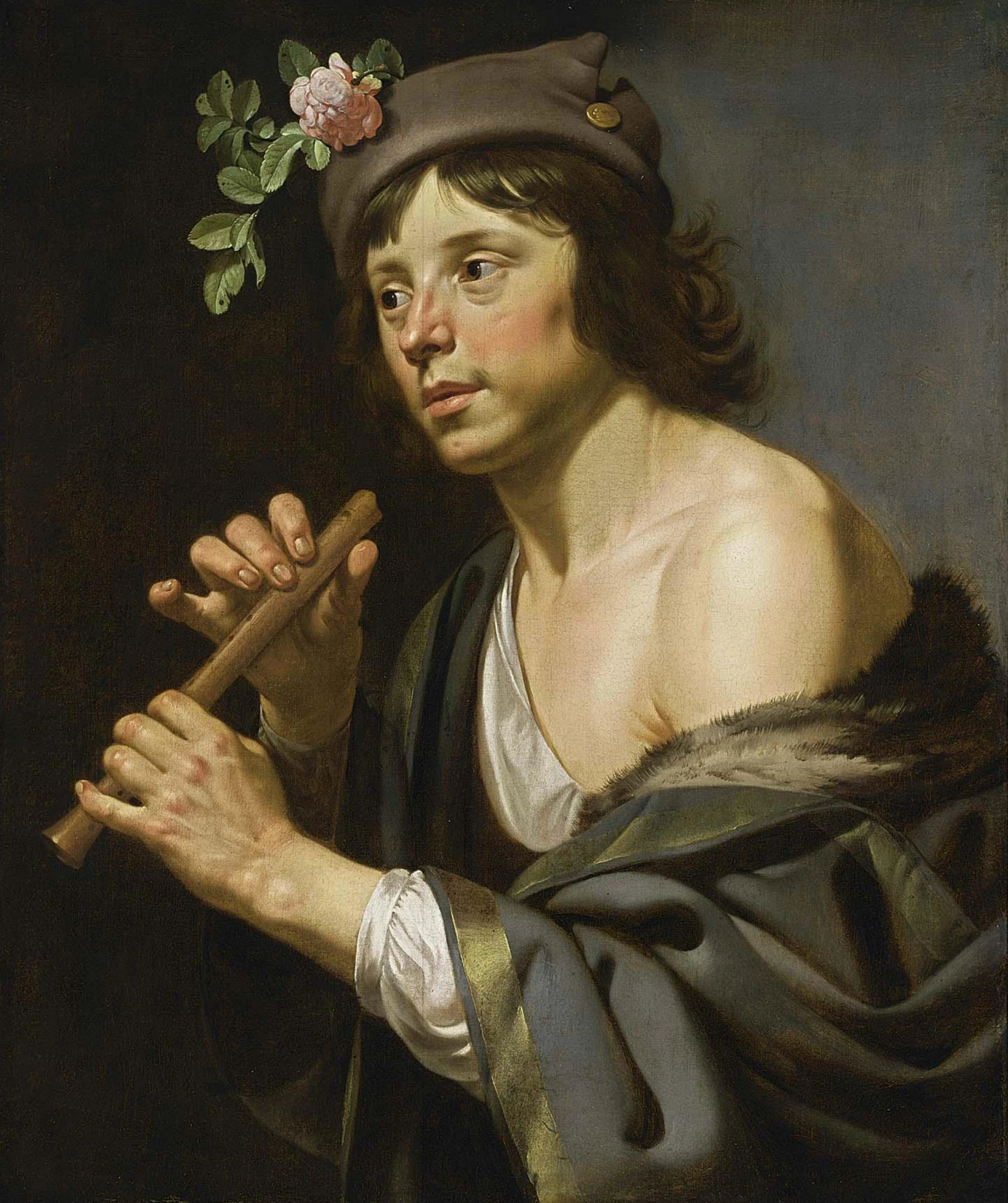
Shepherd Holding a Flute

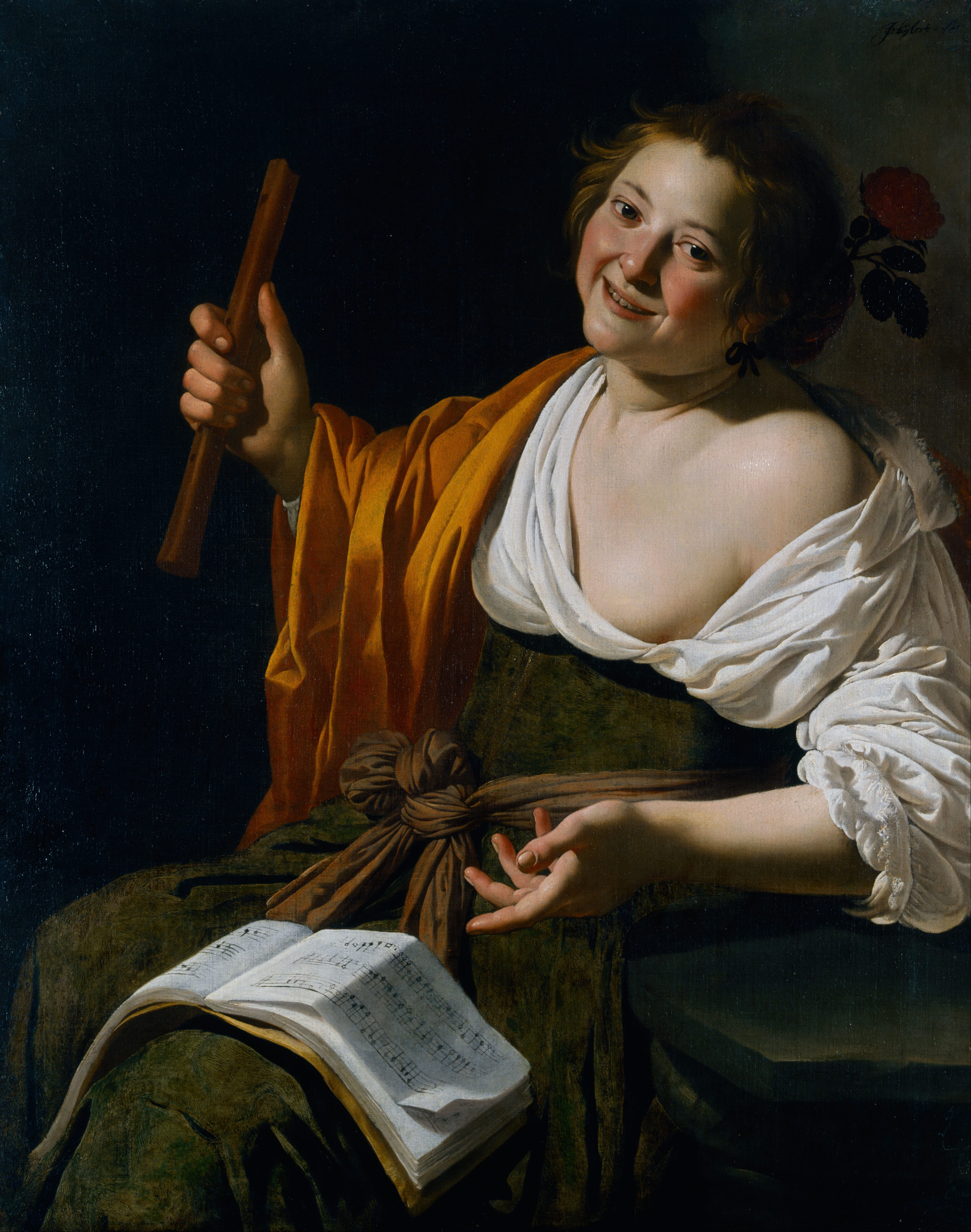
Girl with a Flute

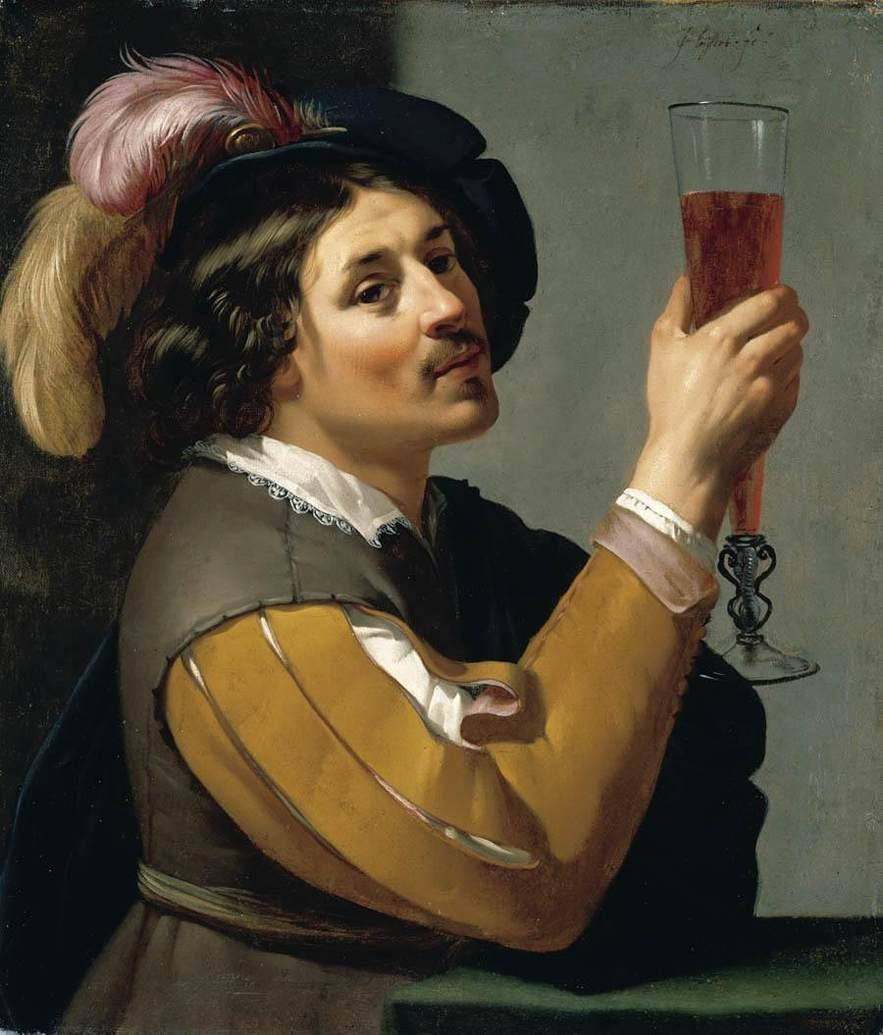
Young Man Drinking a Glass of Wine, ca. 1625

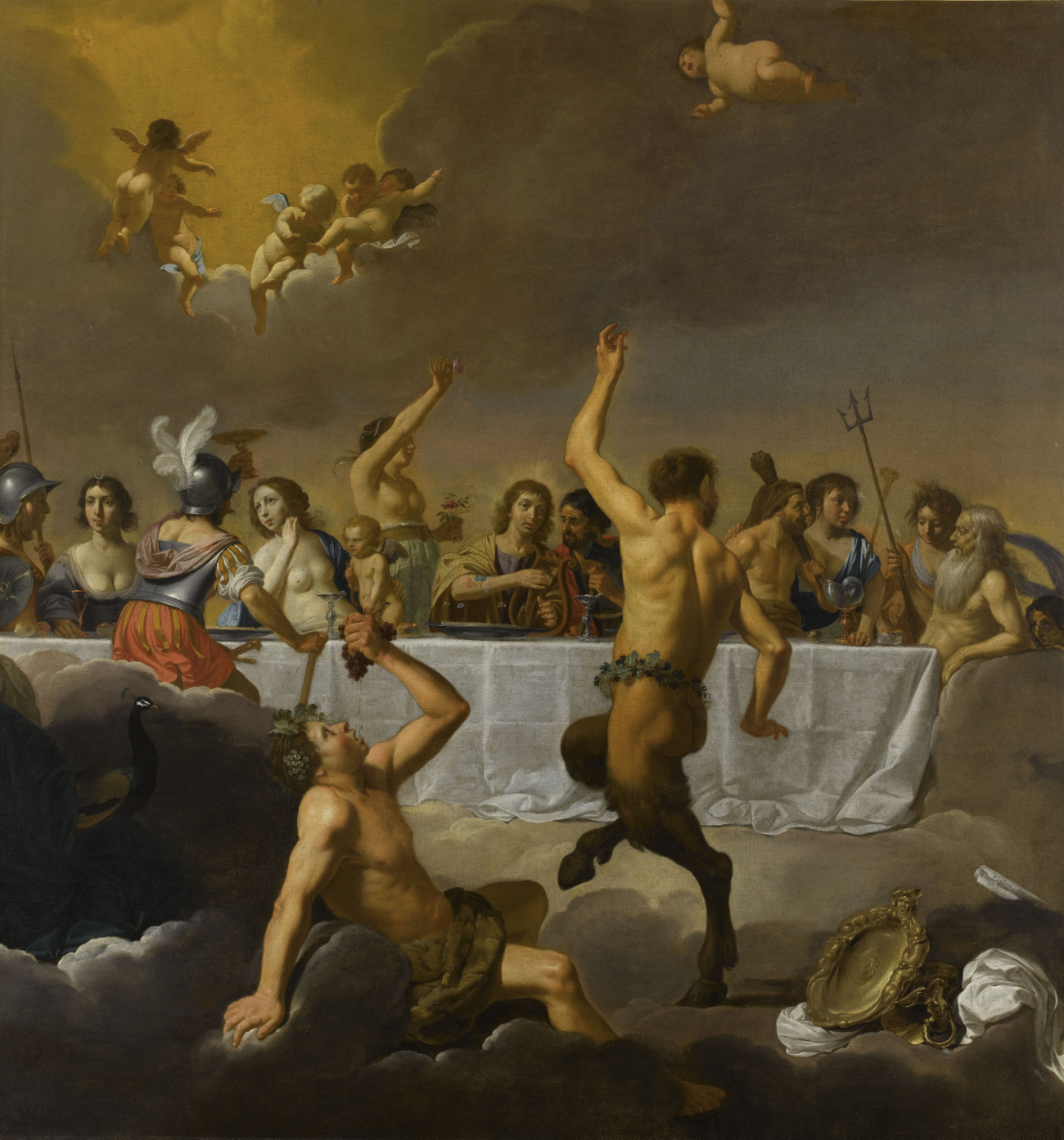
Le Festin des Dieux (The Feast of the Gods)

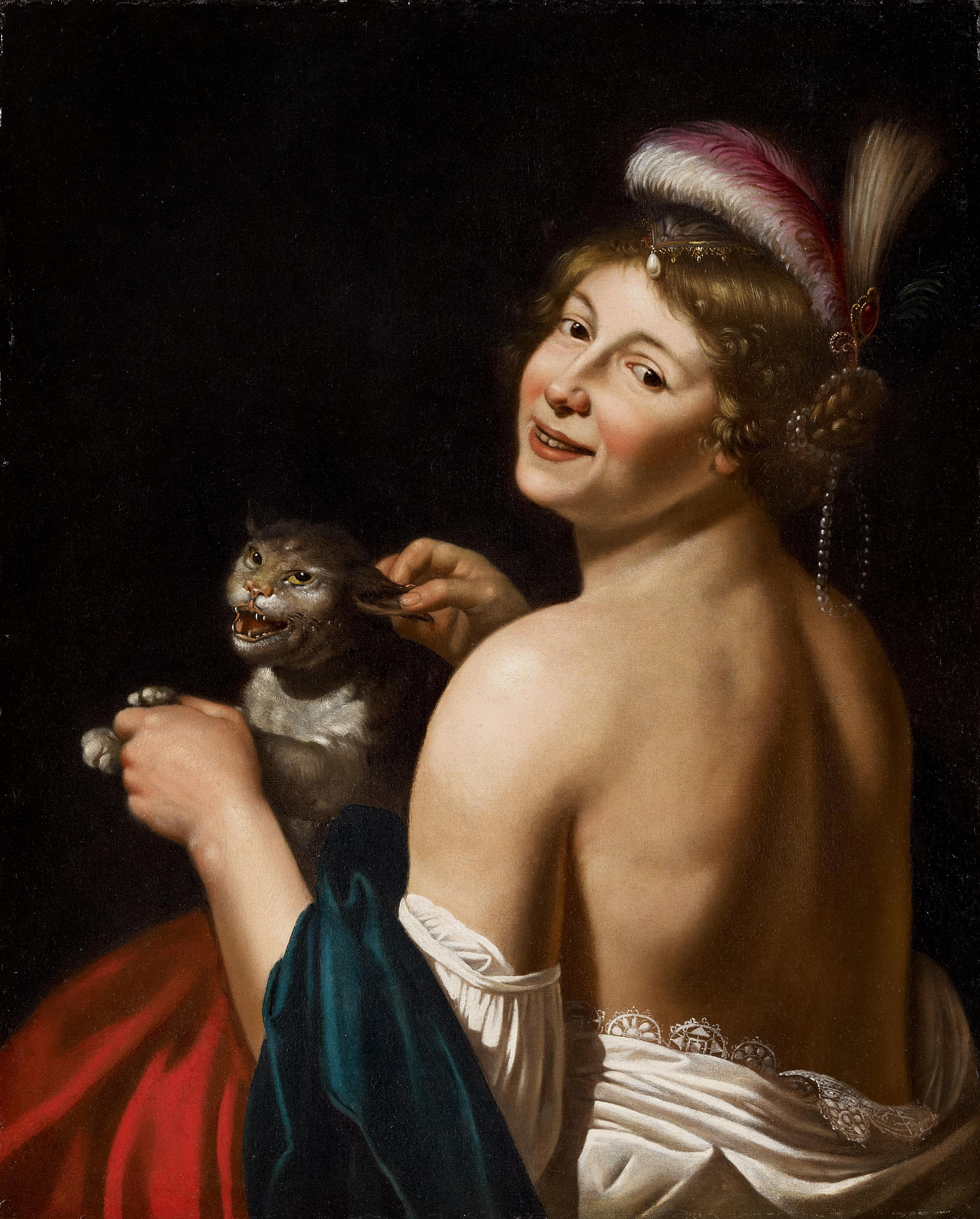
Courtesan (workshop of van Bijlert)

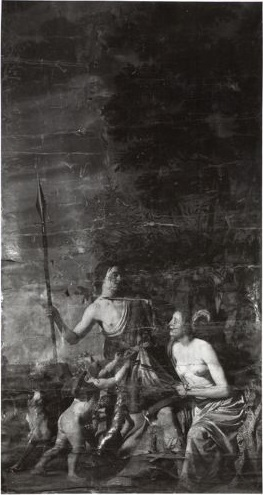
Venus trying to prevent Adonis from going hunting by Jan van Bijlert

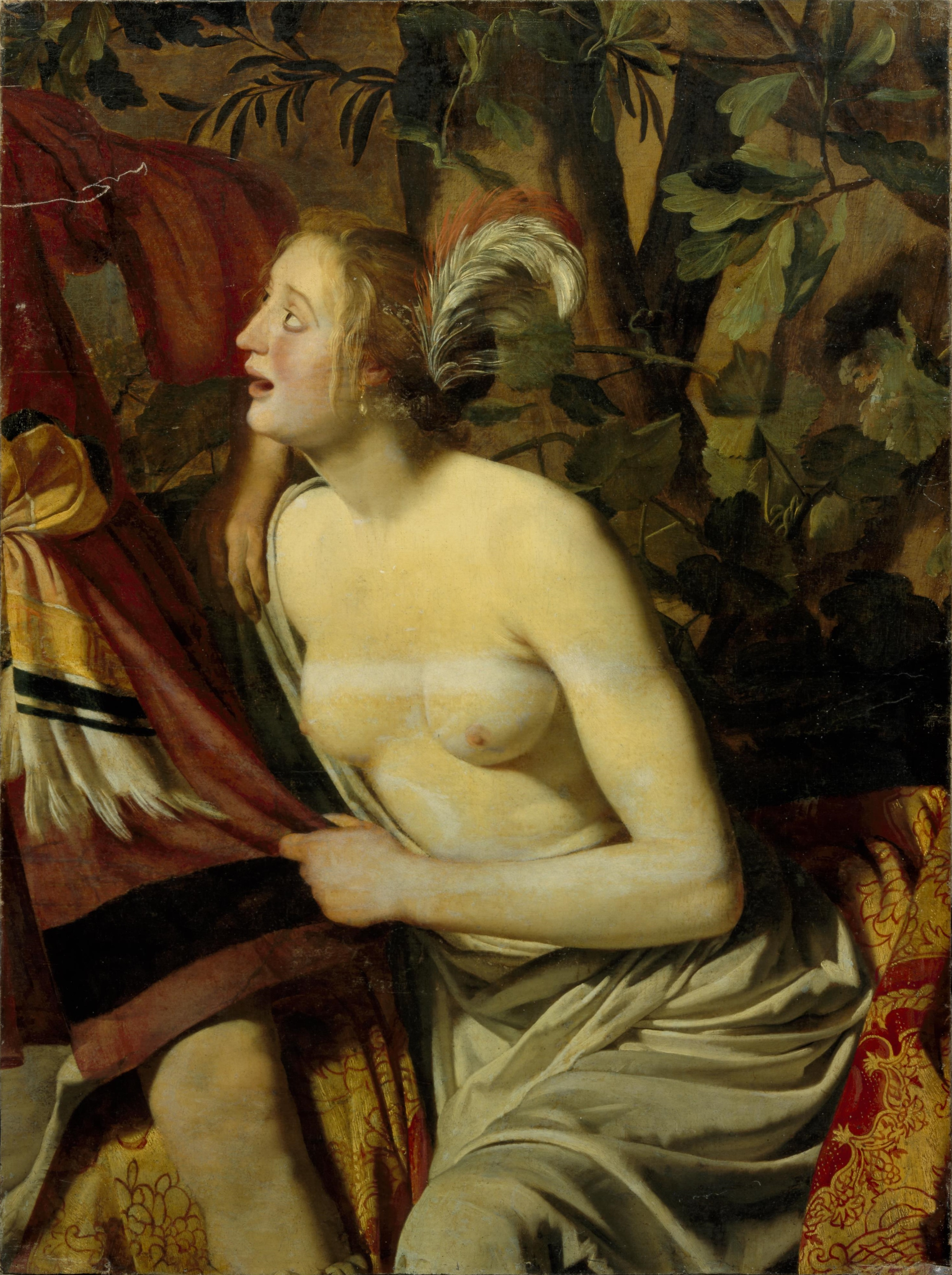
From the achterzaal (back room) of Nieuwegracht 6 in Utrecht, where is served as a wall hanging together with other pieces by Ferdinand Bol now in the Peace Palace in The Hague and the Noordbrabants Museum in 's-Hertogenbosch. The fragment was cut out of the wall hanging in 1934. According to a museum catalog from 1893 the canvas originally measured 396,5 × 202 cm and was signed ‘Jv bijlert fe’.

== Sources ==
- (in Dutch) Joan Bylert biography in De groote schouburgh der Nederlantsche konstschilders en schilderessen (1718) by Arnold Houbraken, courtesy of the Digital library for Dutch literature
