= Toussaint Gelton =

- Born: 1630
- Died: 1680 (aged 49–50); Copenhagen

Toussaint Gelton (1630 – 1680) was a Dutch painter known for his work buying paintings in 1658 for the Swedish king Charles X Gustav and the family of Swedish noble Magnus Gabriel de la Gardie.

Little is known of his early life but he seems to have been trained in the Hague where he was a member of the Confrerie Pictura from 1655 until 1659.

He is known to have been influenced by and made copies after popular Dutch painters, most notably Gerrit Dou and Cornelis van Poelenburgh. He lived in Stockholm from 1666, and became court painter 23 September 1674 to Christian V, the king of Denmark.

Gelton died in Copenhagen.

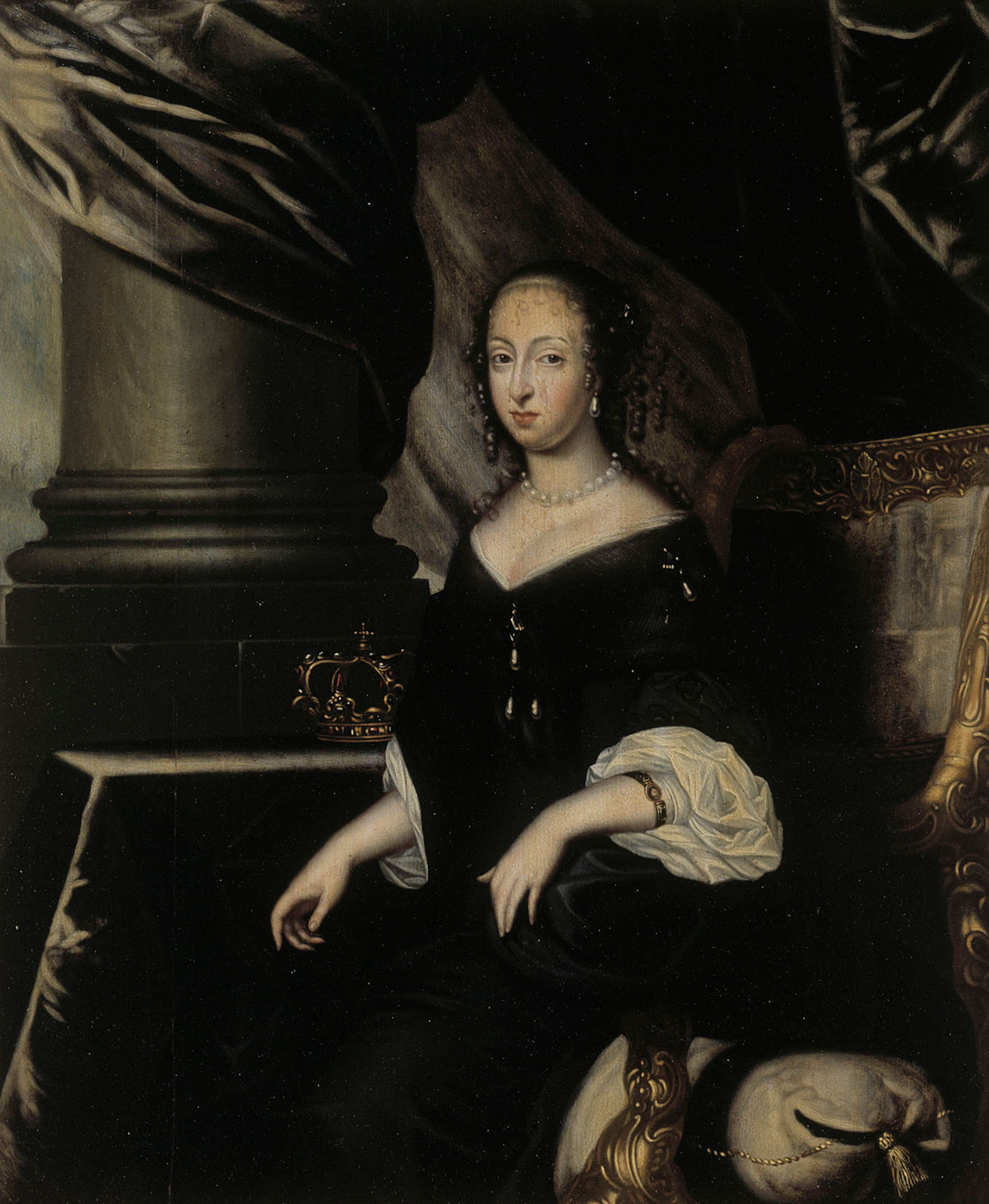
Portrait of Queen Hedvig Eleonora

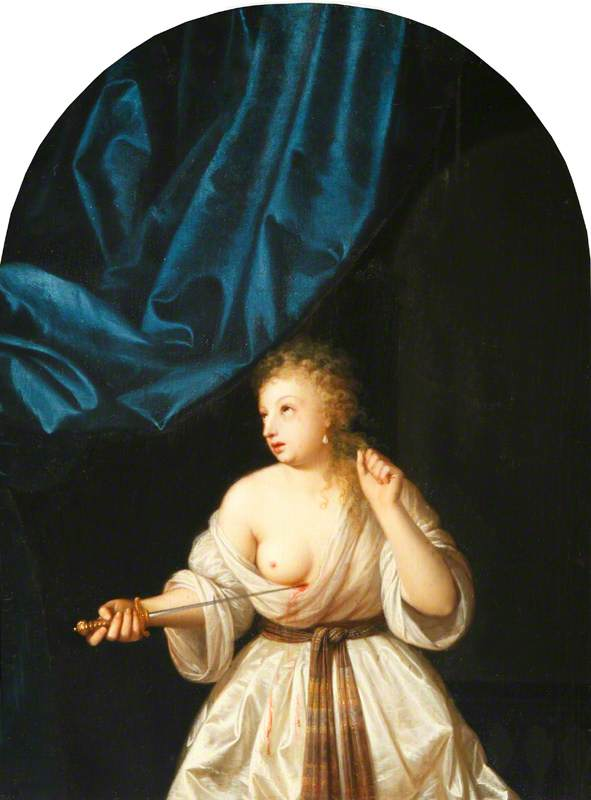
Saint Lucretia

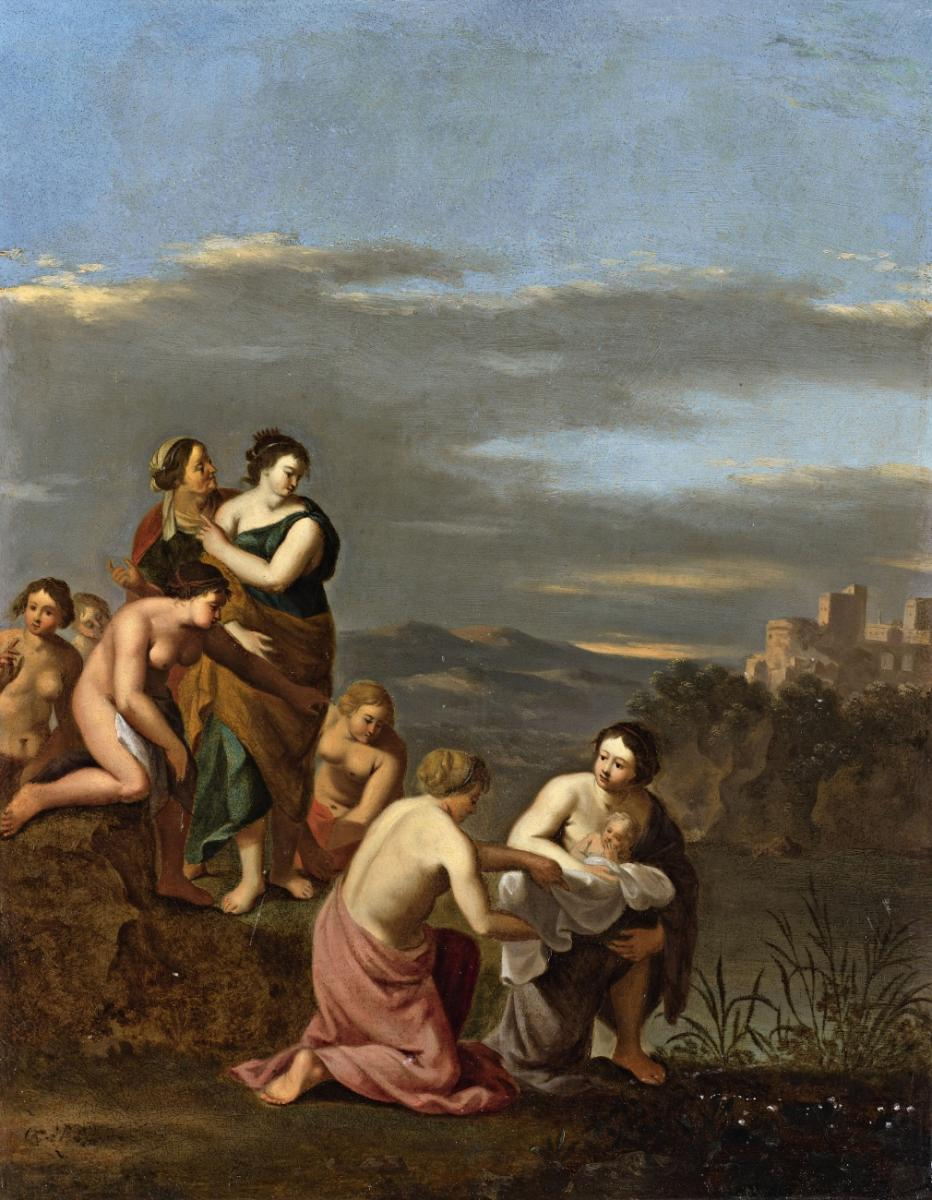
The Discovery of Moses

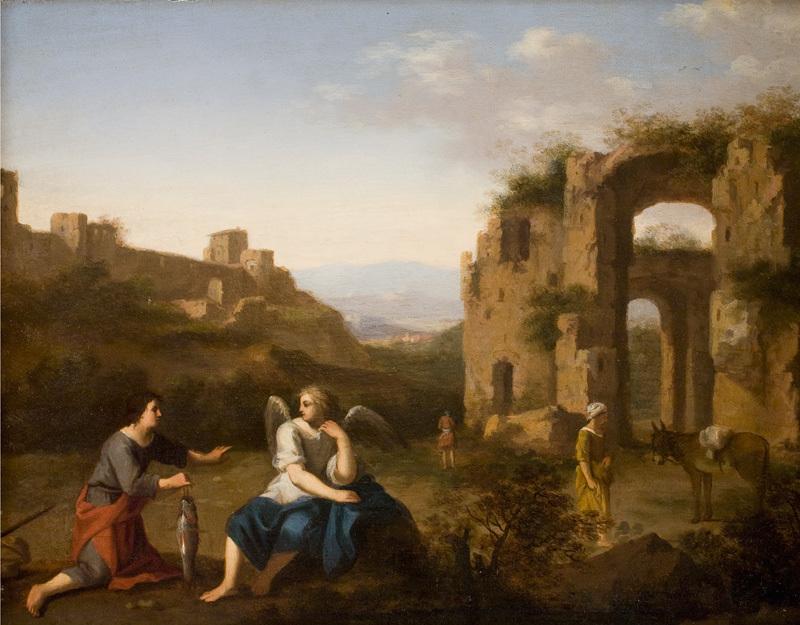
Tobias and the Angel
