= The Feast of the Gods (van Bijlert) =

Painting by Jan van Bijlert

- French: Le Festin des dieux
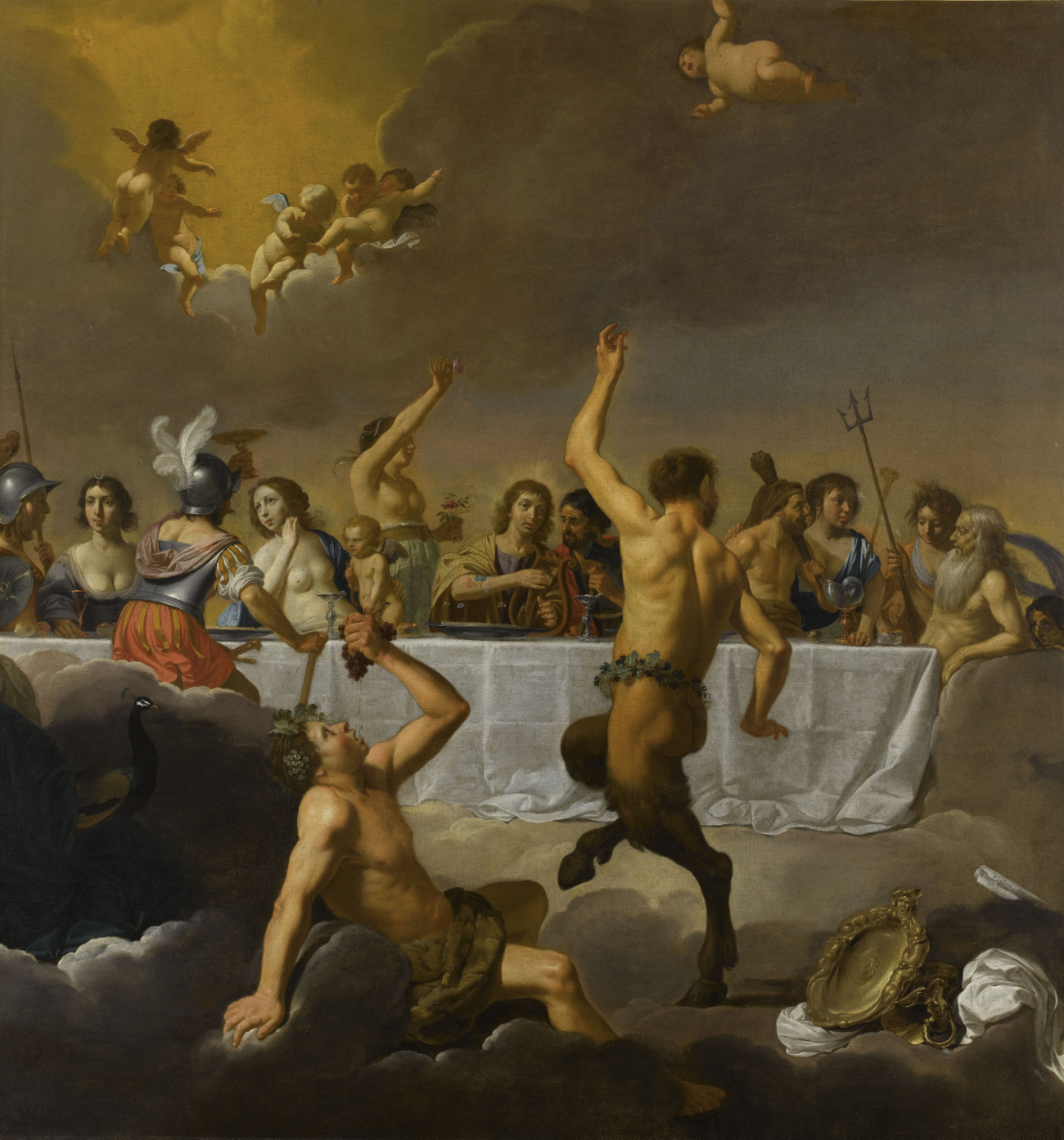
- Artist: Jan van Bijlert
- Year: c. 1635–1640
- Subject: The feast of the Gods
- Location: Musée Magnin, Dijon
- Owner: French state
- Website: musee-magnin.fr/collection/objet/le-festin-des-dieux

The Feast of the Gods (French: Le Festin des dieux) is a painting by the Dutch painter Jan van Bijlert, created around 1635–1640. It is in the Musée Magnin in Dijon, France.

It is one of a number of pictures in western art to depict the feast of the Gods, in this case at the marriage of Thetis and Peleus, with Bacchus in the foreground, and a prominent dancing satyr.

The left-hand side of the painting is lost.

== History ==
The painting represents the popular mythological subject the feast of the Gods, and has been the property of the French Republic since the bequest of the collector Maurice Magnin (1861–1939) in 1938.

The painting came to public attention following a controversy sparked by the 2024 Summer Olympics opening ceremony. During the ceremony, the singer Philippe Katerine made an appearance dressed as almost naked blue Bacchus, with silver spangles and a saffron beard, half-reclining behind a cheese platter, on a platter of colourful fruits and flowers, arranged in offering in the centre of a long banquet table, bringing together different characters including a number of drag queens, stationed behind him. This tableau was widely claimed by some art historians and on social media to be a reference to the well-known painting The Last Supper by Leonardo da Vinci, a claim repeated by many press outlets, but other art historians and the creator himself asserted that it was a reference to The Feast of the Gods.

== Description ==
The painting represents a banquet taking place on Mount Olympus to celebrate the marriage of Thetis, a nereid, and Peleus, king of Phthia, in which many gods from Greco-Roman mythology participate. In the centre, Apollo is crowned and holds a lyre. In the left part we can recognize Minerva, Diana, Mars, Venus, and Cupid and, behind, Flora, the goddess of spring. On the right are Hercules and Neptune, as well as Eris, recognizable by the golden apple of discord that she brought as revenge for not having been invited. In the foreground are a dancing satyr and Bacchus, eating a bunch of grapes.

The left part of the painting has been cut off, explaining the absence of certain gods. For example, Juno's peacock is present, but not the goddess herself.
