= Daniel Vertangen =

Dutch painter

Daniel Vertangen (1601, Amsterdam – ca.1683, Amsterdam), was a Dutch Golden Age painter.

== Biography ==
According to Houbraken he was a pupil of Cornelis van Poelenburch.

According to the RKD he lived most of his life in Amsterdam and is known for landscapes and historical allegories. Though he is often listed as a pupil of Van Poelenburch, there is no documentation about this apprenticeship, but it could have been either before 1617 or as Poelenburch's workshop partner after 1626.

== Selected works ==
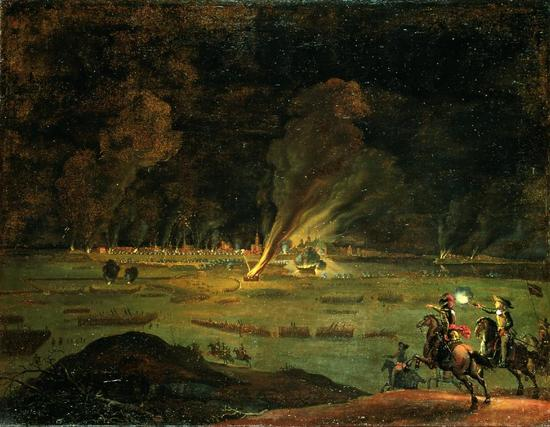
The assault of Copenhagen

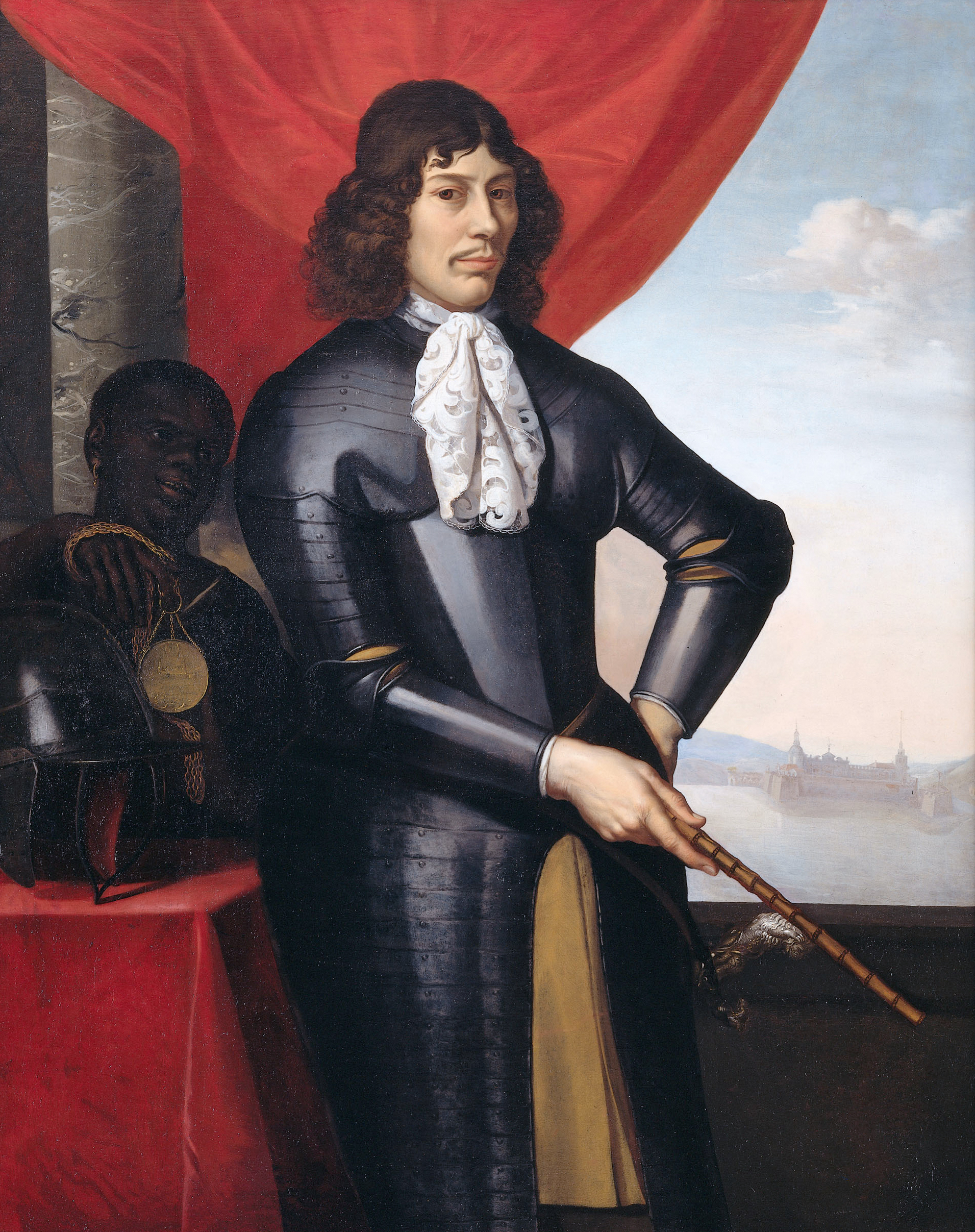
Portrait of Jan Valckenburgh

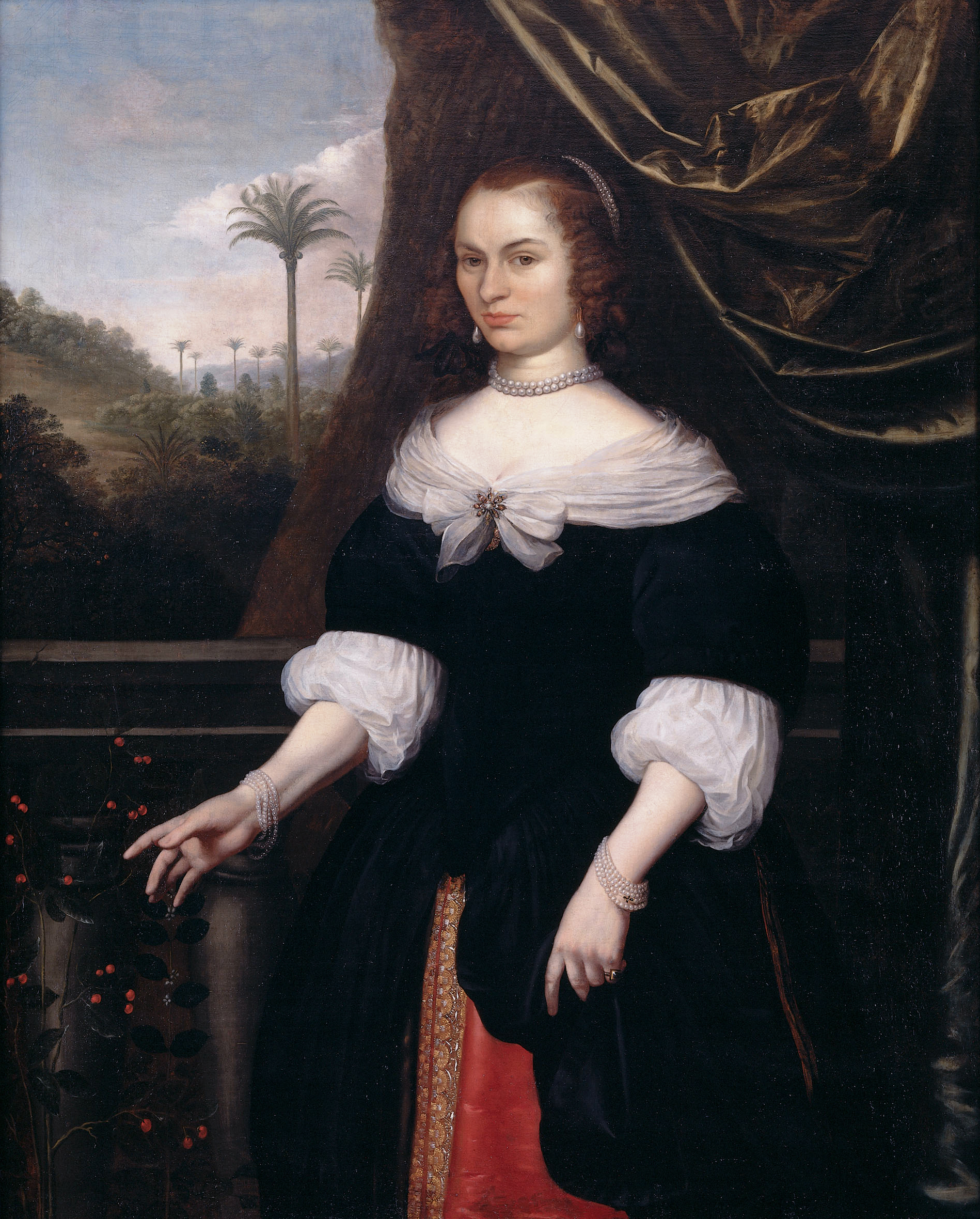
Portrait of Dina Lems, Valckeburgh's wife
