= Cornelis van Poelenburgh =

Dutch painter (1594–1667)

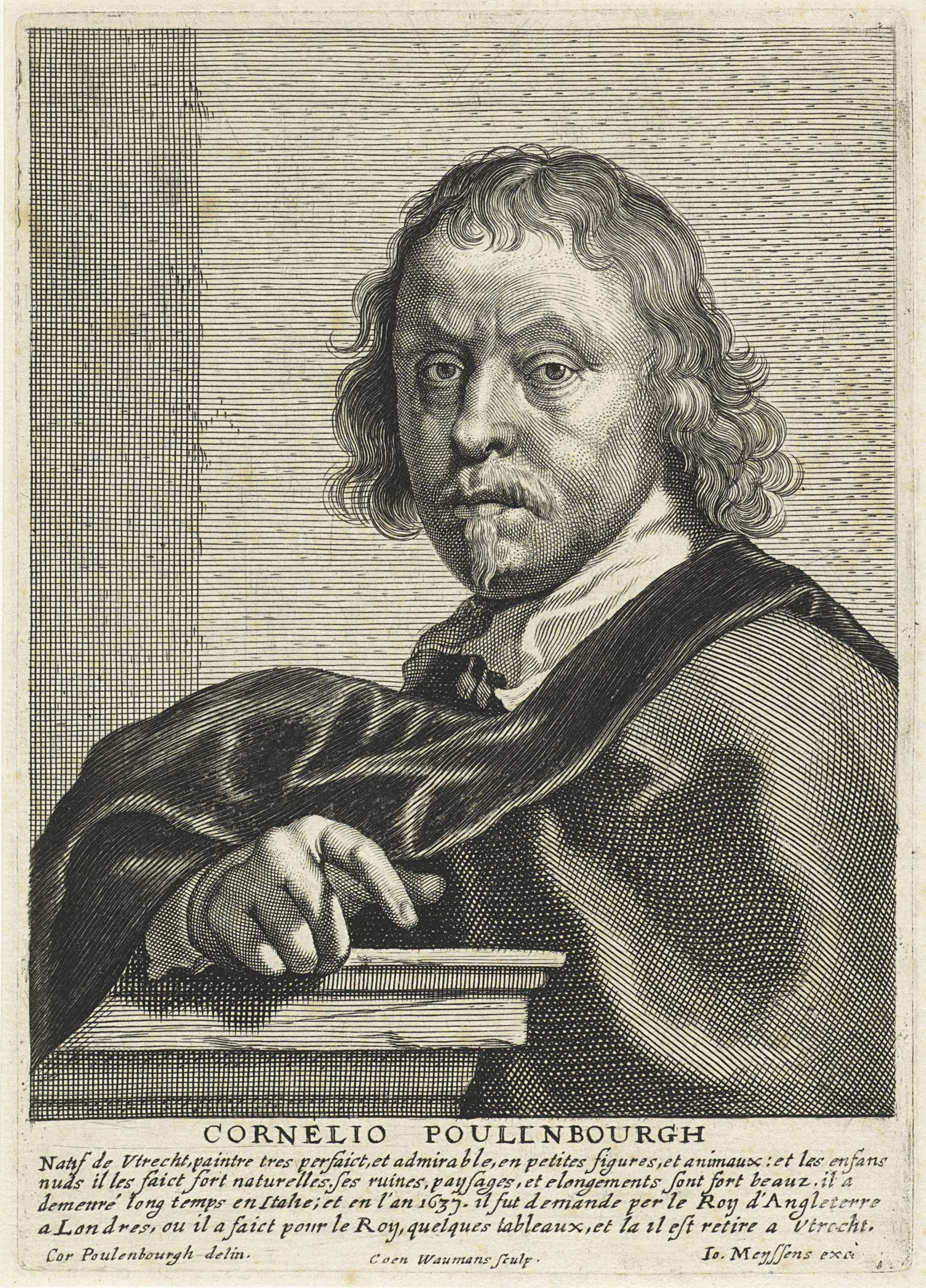
Portrait of Cornelis van Poelenburgh

Cornelis van Poelenburgh or Cornelis van Poelenburch (1594 – 12 August 1667), was a Dutch landscape painter and draughtsman. He was the leading representative of the first generation of Dutch landscape painters who were active in Rome in the early 17th century. He was known for small-scale paintings depicting Italianate landscapes with small figures enacting biblical or mythological scenes or in contemporary attire.

== Life ==
His birthplace is unknown. A signed document survives in Utrecht where he is listed as six years old and the son of Simon van Poelenburch, a Catholic canon in Utrecht. He initially trained with Abraham Bloemaert, and his earliest signed paintings are from 1620. He traveled to Rome where he was influenced by Adam Elsheimer and became a founding member of the Bentvueghels, the society of mainly Flemish and Dutch artists working in Rome. The Bentveughels would typically adopt a nickname referred to as the 'bent name'. Van Poelenburch's bentname was ‘satiro’ (‘Satyr’). He counted a few Roman cardinals under his patrons.

He was called to England by Charles I of England, for whom he made small cabinet pieces. A warrant for payment of rent of a house in Orchard Street, Westminster, for the dwellings of Cornelis van Poelenburgh and Alexander Keirincx, painters employed by the king since July 1638, was receipted by Mary Swetnam on 10 July 1649. He returned to Utrecht where he later died just a few years after his old teacher Abraham Bloemaert.

His "most important and successful" pupils were Daniël Vertangen, Dirck van der Lisse, François Verwilt, and Jan van Haensbergen. Arnold Houbraken claimed that his best pupil was Joan vander Lis from Breda (not Dirck van der Lisse, from The Hague). Houbraken then mentioned Vertangen, Verwilt, Warnard van Rysen from Bommel, and Willem van Steenree, a nephew. The RKD also mentions Laurens Barata and Toussaint Gelton.

== Work ==
He painted mostly small landscapes with mythical or religious figures or passages, in a style that would later be evident in some of the works of Claude Lorrain. His figures are often placed by classical ruins. His early work is similar in style to that of Bartholomeus Breenbergh to the point that their paintings are sometimes difficult to tell apart.

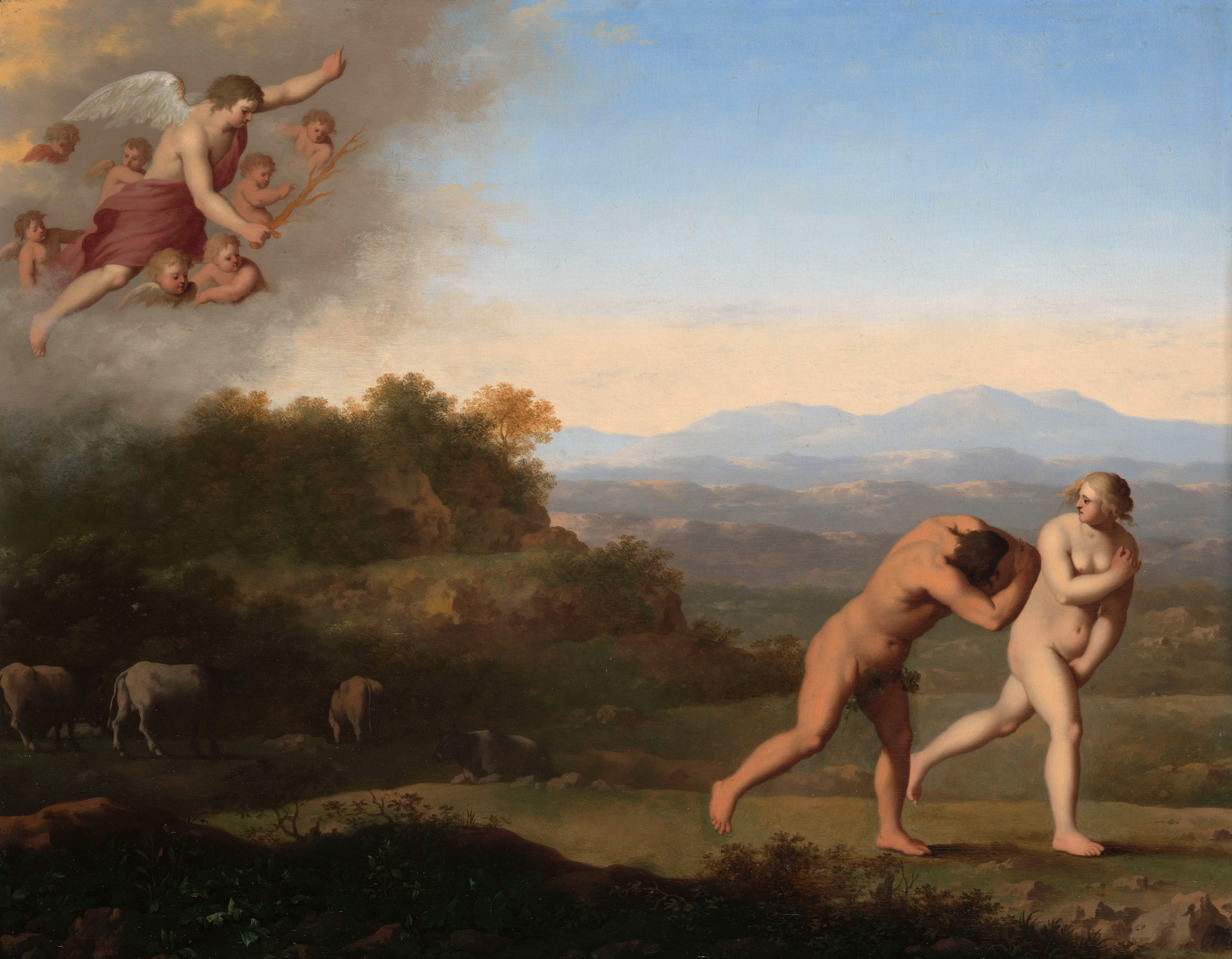
Expulsion from Paradise

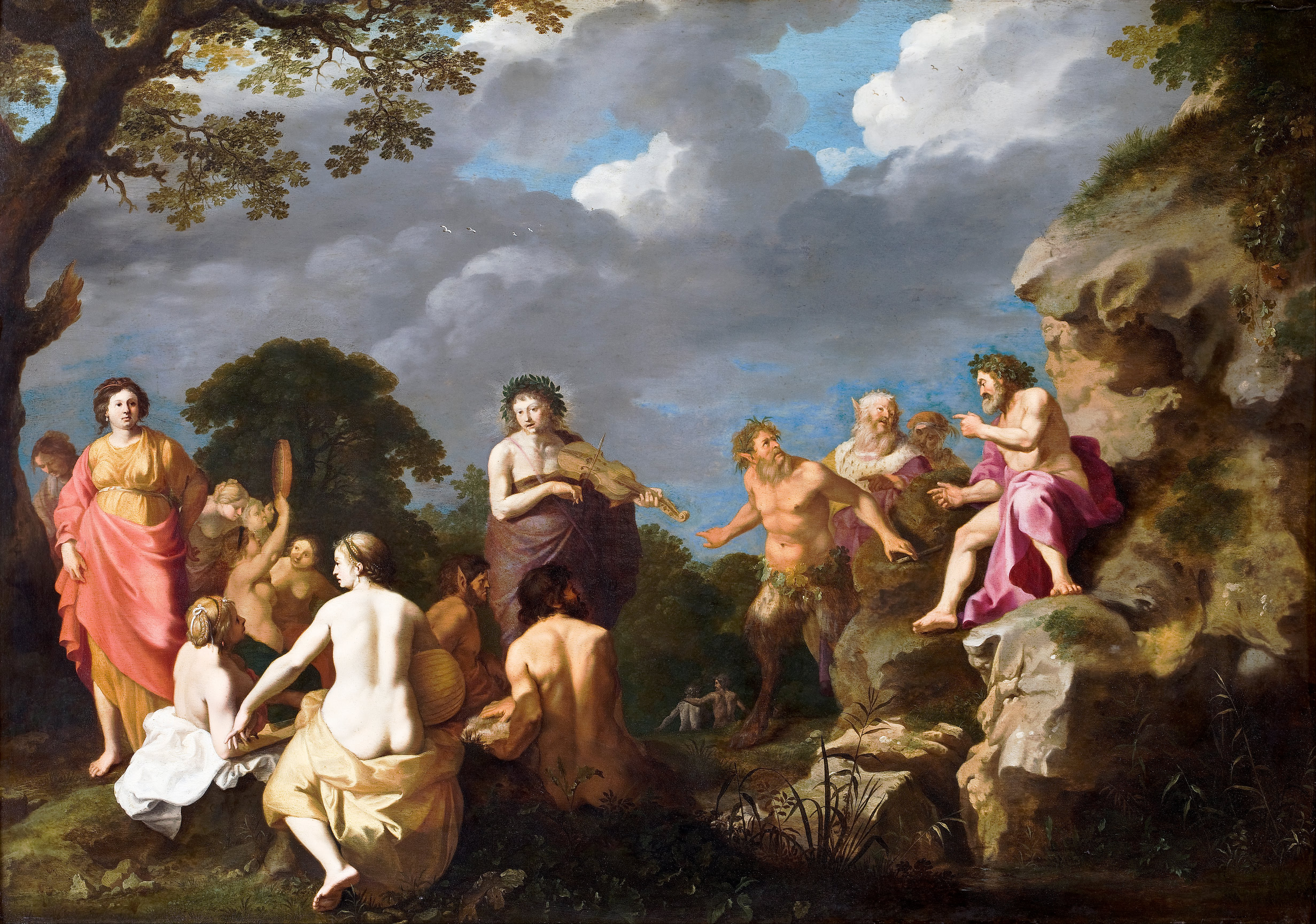
The Musical Contest between Apollo and Marsyas

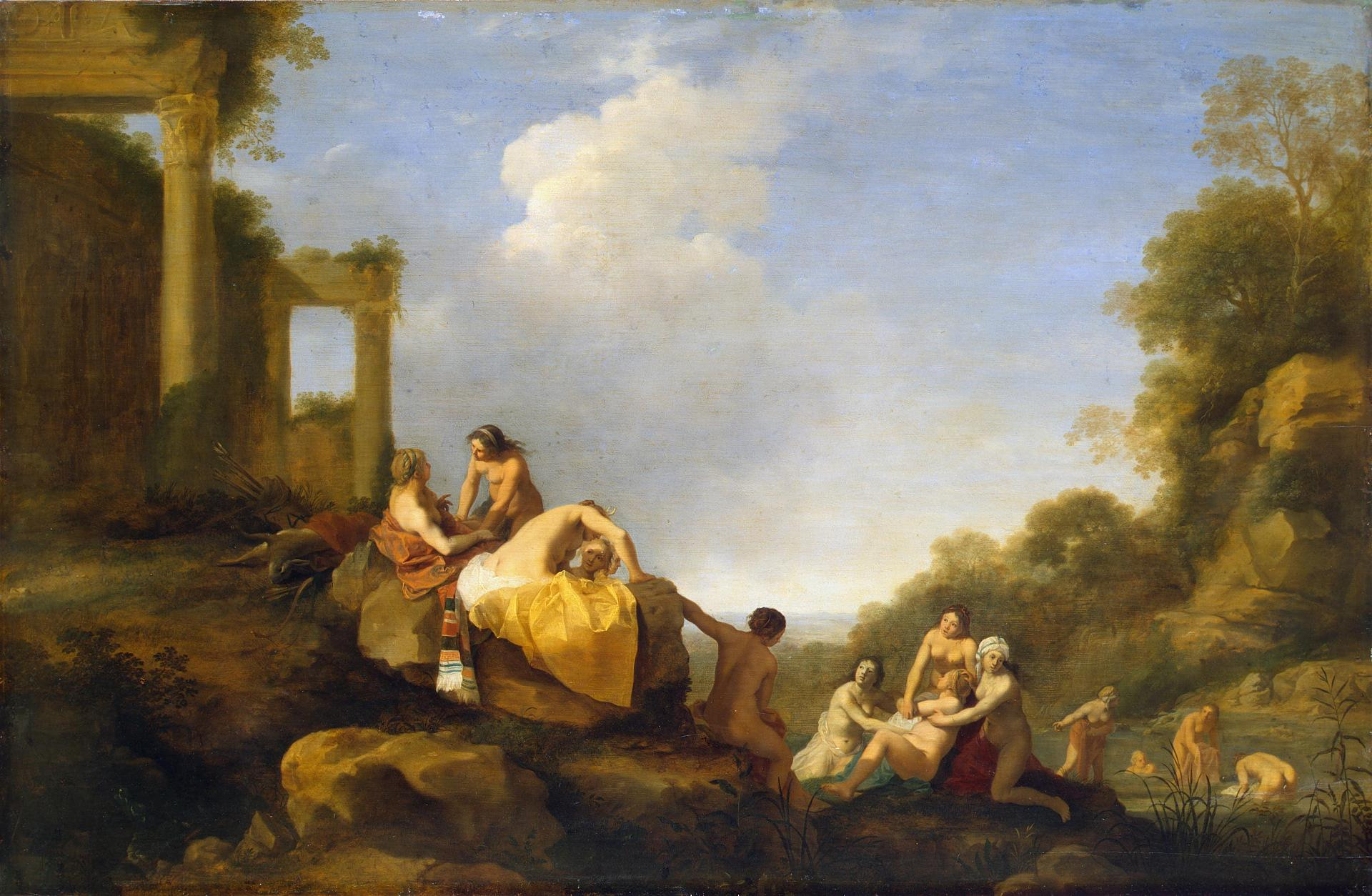
Landscape with Diana and Callisto
