= Bloemaert =

Bloemaert is the name of a family of Dutch artists:

- Abraham Bloemaert (1566 – 1651), Dutch painter
  - Hendrick Bloemaert (1602 – 1672), Dutch painter
  - Cornelis Bloemaert (1603 – 1692), Dutch engraver
  - Adriaan Bloemaert (ca. 1609 – 1666), Dutch painter
  - Frederik Bloemaert (ca. 1614 – 1690), Dutch engraver

== See also ==
- Esther Barbara Bloemart
