= Lauwers (surname) =

Lauwers is a Dutch surname most common in Flanders. It may be of patronymic origin ('son of Laurens') or indicate an occupation ('lawyer'). People with this surname include:

- Achiel Lauwers (1864–1910), Belgian Catholic priest
- Balthasar Lauwers (1578–1645), Flemish landscape painter active in Rome
- Barbara Lauwers (1914–2009), Czech lawyer and US Army soldier
- Christophe Lauwers (born 1972), Belgian footballer
- Conrad Lauwers (1632–1685), Flemish engraver
- Daniel Lauwers (born 1963), American member of the Michigan Senate
- Dimitri Lauwers (born 1979), Belgian basketball player
- Emiel Lauwers (1858–1921), Belgian artistic and cultural flamingantist
- Engelbert Lauwers (1788–1872), Belgian senator
- Henk Lauwers (born 1956), Belgian baritone singer
- Herman Lauwers (born 1953), Belgian politician
- Huub Lauwers (1915–2004), Dutch resistance fighter
- Jan Lauwers (born 1938), Belgian former road cyclist
- Jan Lauwers (architect) (1898–1988), Belgian architect
- Jan Lauwers (director) (born 1957), Belgian theater director
- J. M. Lauwers (1881–1965), Dutch educator
- Nicolaes Lauwers (1600–1652), Flemish engraver
- Pieter Lauwers (born 1760), Belgian burgomaster
- Renée Lauwers (born 1923), Belgian poet
- Sofie Lauwers (born 1991), Belgian medium-distance runner
- Vinny Lauwers (born 1967), Australian sailor
- Willy Lauwers (1936–1959), Belgian racing cyclist
- Wine Lauwers (born 1985), Belgian singer and radio host
- Jo Valley (né Valère Lauwers; born 1958), Belgian singer

== See also ==
- Lauwers
