= Nicolas Pitau =

French engraver (1632–1671)

Nicolas Pitau, or Pittou the Senior (13 May 1632 – 11 February 1671) was a Flemish-born French engraver and printmaker.

== Biography ==
Born in Antwerp on 13 May 1632 Pitau began his training with his godfather Nicolaes Lauwers (1600–1652), and his brother Conrad Lauwers (1622–1675) in around 1650. In 1656 Pitau moved to Paris with Conrad, where he began producing etched plates after the work of Philippe de Champaigne. In 1666 he began to publish plates after the work of Gerard Edelinck. He married Magdalena de Vadder. On 4 June 1670 his son, Nicolas Pitau the Younger was born. A year later on 11 February 1671 Nicholas Pitau died in Paris.
