= Federico Visconti =

Italian Cardinal and archbishop

His Eminence Federico Visconti
- Cardinal, Archbishop of Milan
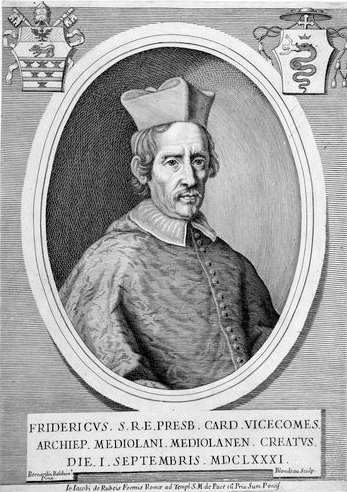
- Engraved portrait of Cardinal Federico Visconti, by Jacques Blondeau, 1681
- Church: Catholic Church
- See: Milan
- Appointed: 23 June 1681
- Term ended: 7 January 1693
- Predecessor: Alfonso Litta
- Successor: Federico Caccia
- Other post: Cardinal Priest of Santi Bonifacio e Alessio

Orders
- Consecration: 10 Aug 1681 (Bishop) by Gasparo di Carpegna
- Created cardinal: 1 September 1681 by Pope Innocent XI

Personal details
- Born: 4 December 1617 Milan
- Died: 7 January 1693 (aged 75) Milan
- Buried: Cathedral of Milan
- Coat of arms

Federico Visconti (1617–1693) was an Italian Cardinal and Archbishop of Milan from 1681 to 1693.

== Early life ==
Federico Visconti was born in Milan on 4 December 1617, to count Carlo of the House of Visconti, last of six brothers. He studied in the college of Brera in Milan and later he was admitted at the Collegio Borromeo in Pavia and graduated in law at the University of Bologna. Advised by his uncle Francesco Borromeo, bishop of Cremona, he entered in the clerical state and moved to Rome. However he soon returned to Milan, where he served as diocesan priest. In 1644 he became a lawyer, from 1646 to 1662 he was primicerio (third position of the chapter of the Cathedral of Milan), from 1651 to 1652 prefect of Biblioteca Ambrosiana.

In 1658 he was sent to Rome by the chapter of the cathedral, where Pope Alexander VII appointed him referendary of the Tribunals of the Apostolic Signature. Entered in the administration of the Papal States, he served as governor of Tivoli, Città di Castello and Montalto. Returned in 1667 to Rome, he became an auditor (judge) of the Roman Rota, an office he held until 1681.

== Archbishop of Milan ==
On 23 June 1681 Federico Visconti was appointed Archbishop of Milan. He was consecrated bishop on 10 August 1681 in Rome by the hands of Cardinal Gasparo di Carpegna. On 1 September of the same year he was appointed Cardinal Priest of Santi Bonifacio e Alessio, and he made his solemn entrance in Milan as Archbishop on next 11 January 1682.

Federico Visconti was a typical bishop shaped by the Counter-Reformation. He took very seriously his service, condemned the licentious uses of the population and fought the Protestantism in Valtellina, erecting a sanctuary in Lezzeno and forbidding almost any contact of the population with the Protestant soldiers who passed throughout North Italy. Following the example of Saint Charles Borromeo, he visited, from 1682 to 1689, all the 67 pieves which composed the large diocese, and in September 1687 he celebrated the 37th diocesan synod.

Federico Visconti maintained good relations with the Spanish government (who ruled the Duchy of Milan), and with this aim he waived the right of asylum in the churches for the deserters, and he asked the population to support with offerings the Battle of Vienna against the Ottoman Empire.

He participated in the Conclaves of 1689 and 1691, but he was forced due to an illness to leave the Conclave before the election of the pope. He died in Milan on 7 January 1693, and his remains were buried in the north nave of the Cathedral of Milan.
