= Adriaan Bloemaert =

17th-century Dutch painter

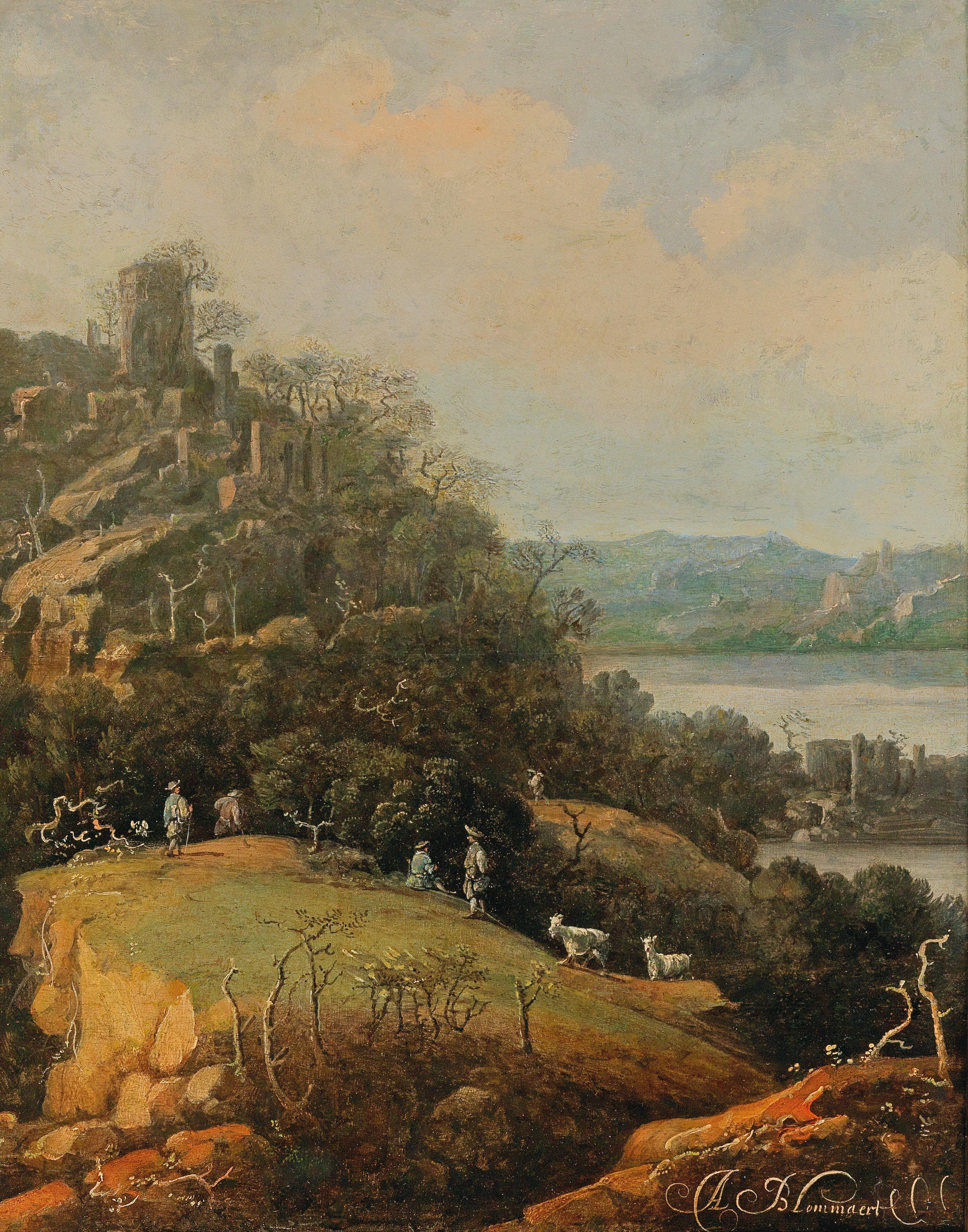
A river landscape with a ruin and figures (oil on panel)

Adriaan Bloemaert (after 1609 in Utrecht – buried 8 January 1666 in Utrecht) was a Dutch painter.

Bloemaert was the fourth son of Abraham Bloemaert, and younger brother of Hendrick, Frederik and Cornelis Bloemaert. He received his first instruction from his father. He was sent to Italy, where he studied until 1637. He then visited Vienna, where he became employed, but settled at Salzburg the same year. In 1640 he visited Freistadt. By 1651 he had returned to his hometown, where he stayed until his death. Bloemaert painted history and portraits with some success. Heineken attributes to this artist several plates of portraits, although they are without his name.
