= Moses Striking the Rock =

1596 painting by Abraham Bloemaert

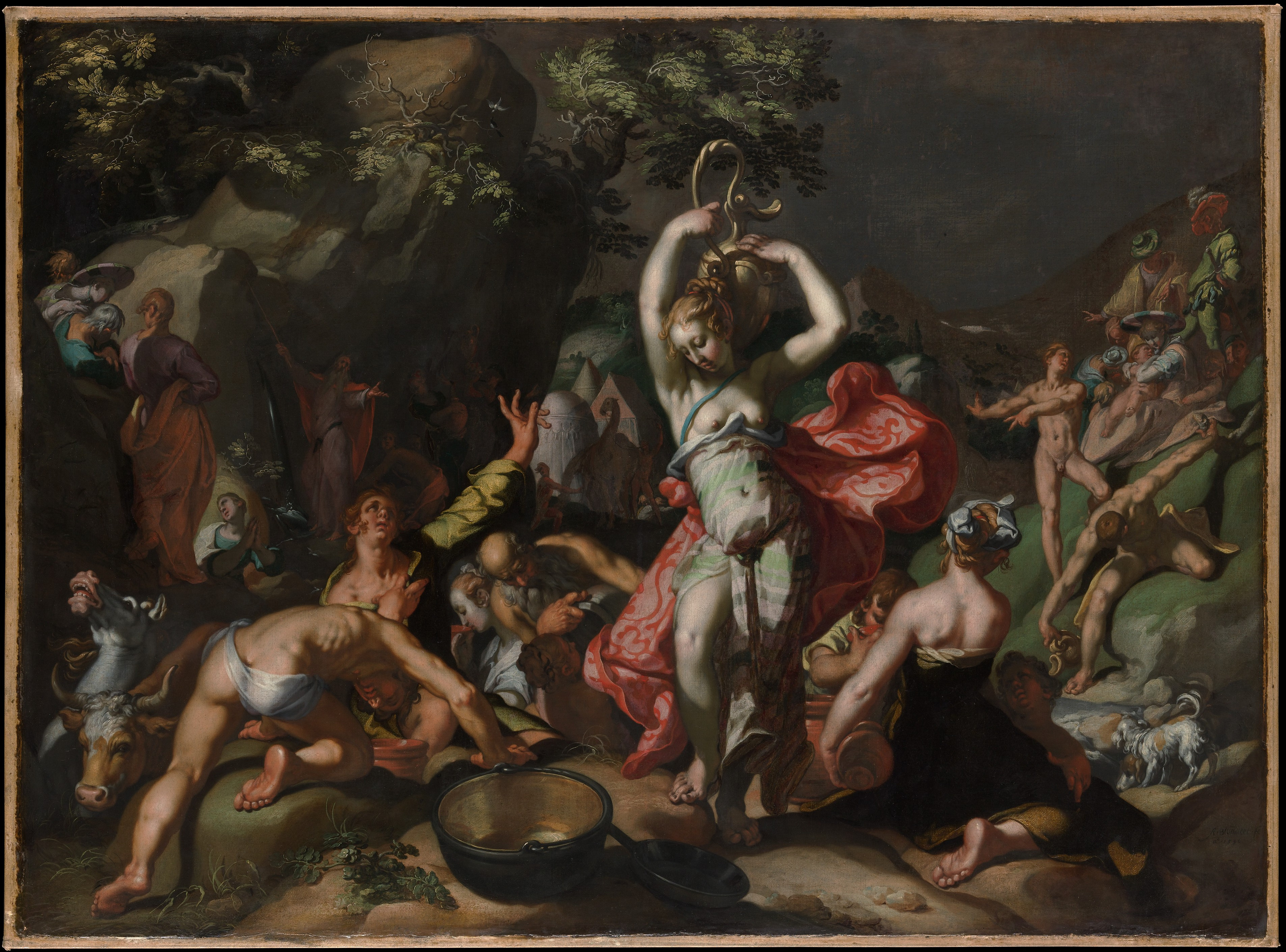
- Artist: Abraham Bloemaert
- Year: 1596
- Dimensions: 79.7 cm × 108 cm (31.4 in × 43 in)
- Location: Metropolitan Museum of Art; New York City

Moses Striking the Rock is a late 16th century painting by Dutch artist Abraham Bloemaert. Done in oil on canvas, the work depicts a scene from the Old Testament in which the prophet Moses strikes the grounds to draw forth water for the Israelites. The painting is in the collection of the Metropolitan Museum of Art.

== Description ==
Bloemaert's painting features many hallmarks of Late Renaissance Mannerism, of which movement the Dutch artist was a part. The figures seen in Moses are preternaturally muscled, and have noble bearings. These depictions were inspired by contemporary Italian art.
