= Coenraed Lauwers =

Flemish engraver and publisher

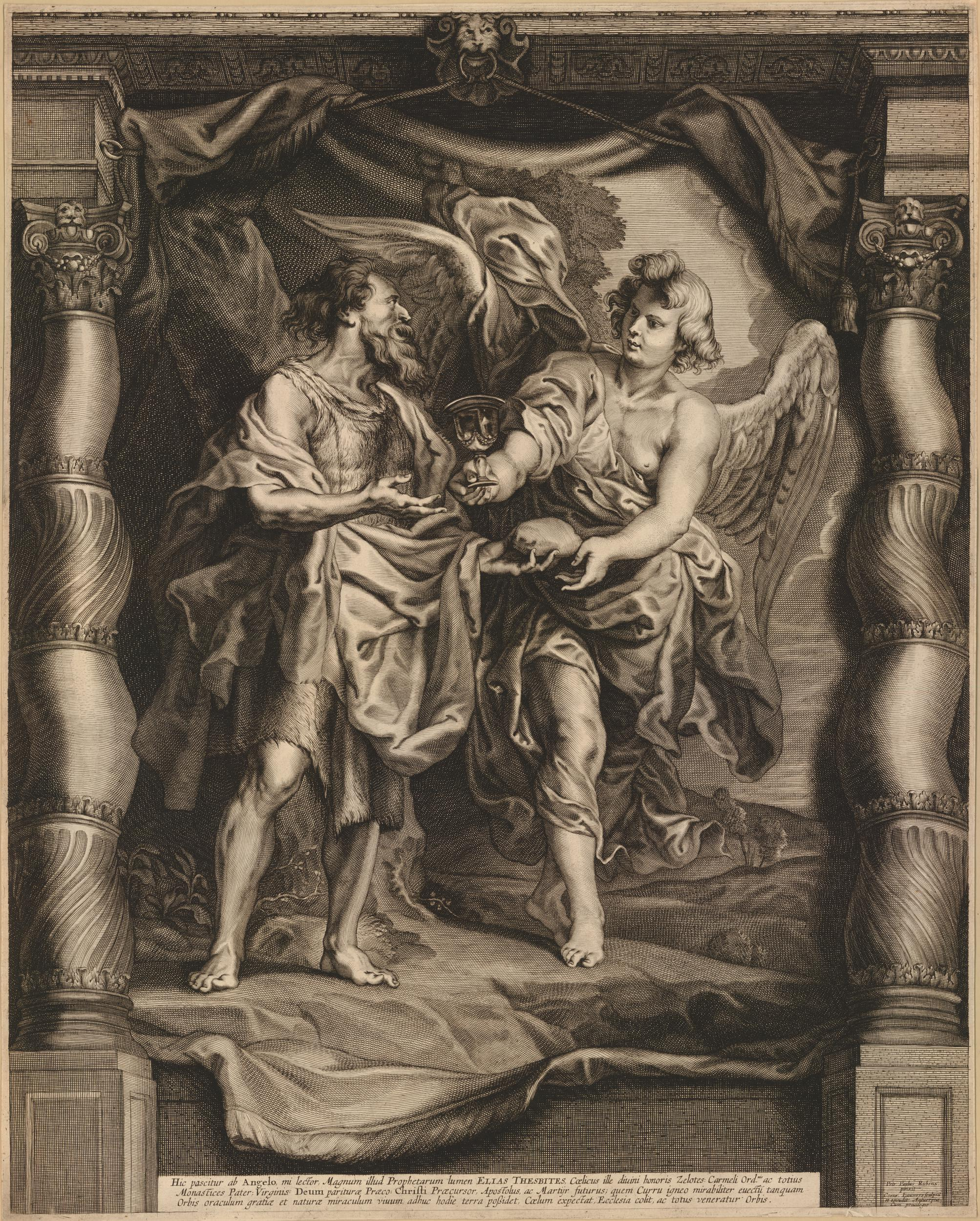
Elijah fed by an angel, after Rubens

Coenraed Lauwers or Coenraad Lauwers, Latinized as Coenradus Lauwers(1632 in Antwerp – 1685 in Antwerp) was a Flemish engraver, etcher and print seller. He was mainly active as a reproducer of works of leading Antwerp painters.

== Life ==
He was the son of Nicolaes Lauwers and Maria Vermeulen and was baptized on 20 June 1632. His father was also an engraver, etcher and print seller. He had a brother called Norbertus. He likely trained with his father and may have worked in the family workshop.

He resided in Paris from 1657 to 1659. The Flemish artist biographer Cornelis de Bie included a short poem about Lauwers on page 562 of his book of artist biographies, Het Gulden Cabinet, with the remark that from his visits to Paris Lauwers brought back prints by the French engravers François Polly, Robert Nanteuil and others to sell them in his shop. In Paris he engraved after the designs of Laurent de La Hyre the majority of the images of Christian saints that formed the series Porticus religiosa effigies. The images were executed in grisaille to resemble the statutes of these saints in the convent of the Franciscans at la Place Royale of Paris.

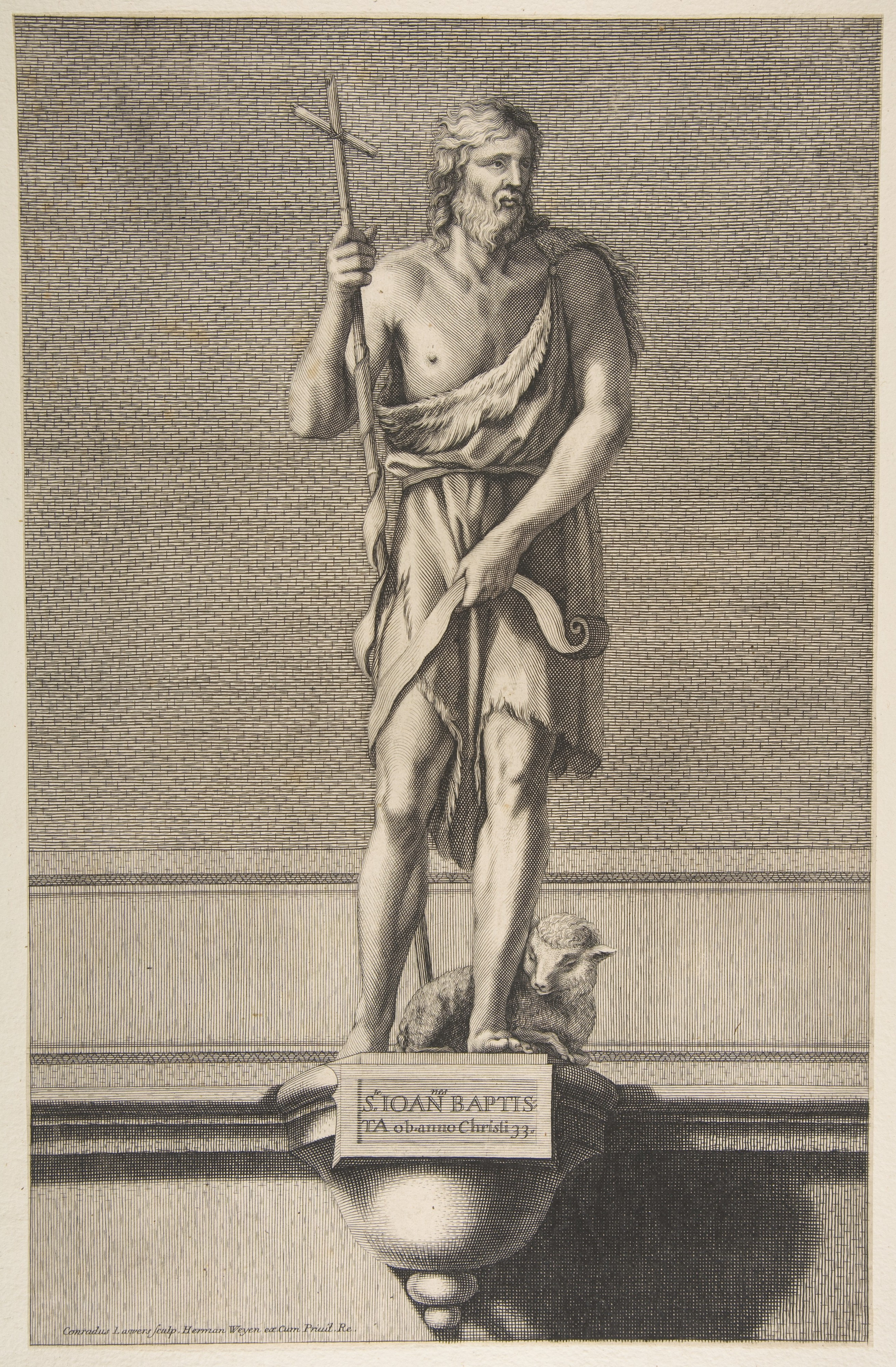
St. John Baptist, after Laurent de La Hyre

He was registered at the Antwerp Guild of St. Luke as a wijnmeester (master who is the son of a (former) member of the Guild) in the specialty of engraver in the guild year 1660–1661. He also became in the same year a member of the "Sodaliteit van de Bejaerde Jongmans", a fraternity for senior bachelors established by the Jesuit order in Antwerp. In the guild year 1660-1661 Jakobus Buys became his pupil. He may have visited Florence around 1677 as he made an engraving after a fresco in the Palazzo Pitti in Florence.

He died in Antwerp in 1685.

== Work ==
Like his father Nicolaes, he is known for engravings after Rubens.

He was one of the engravers who collaborated on the Theatrum Pictorium (Theatre of Painting), a book published in the 1660s by David Teniers the Younger for his employer, the Archduke Leopold Wilhelm of Austria. It was a catalog of 243 Italian paintings in the Archduke's collection of over 1300 paintings, with engravings of the paintings taken from small models that Teniers had personally prepared. David Teniers' brother Abraham Teniers was involved in organizing the publication of the work.

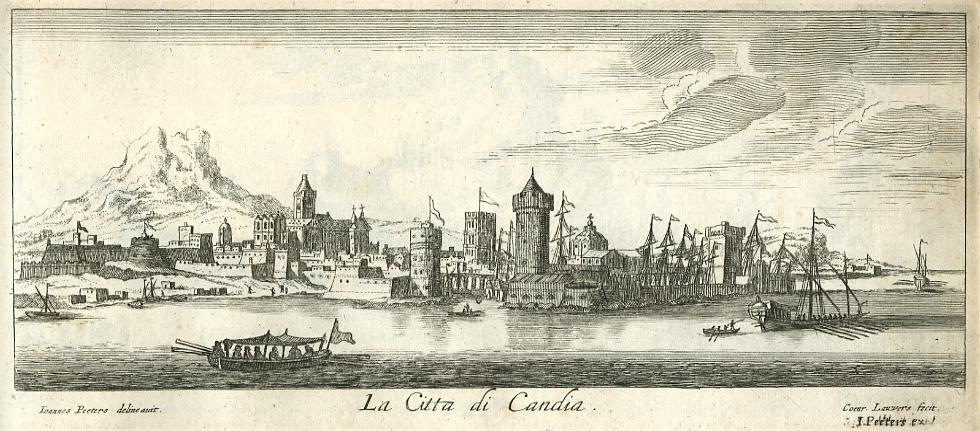
View of Heraklion, after Jan Peeters the Elder

He was further one of the engravers who collaborated on the book of artist biographies authored by Cornelis de Bie and published in 1662 in Antwerp by Joannes Meyssens under the title Het Gulden Cabinet (The Golden Cabinet). The book contains artist biographies and panegyrics of 16th- and 17th-century artists, predominantly from the Habsburg Netherlands. While the book is written in Dutch, it contains engraved portraits of the artist with a short description in French. The portraits were engraved by a large number of artists including Lauwers. Lauwers engraved the portraits of Artus Quellinus II, Joris van Son, Pieter van Bredael, Pieter Boel, and Pieter Verbruggen the Elder for this publication.

He participated in a publication containing 10 plates and a frontispiece of views of Crete and Malta after drawings by Jan Peeters the Elder published by Jan Peeters in Antwerp around 1665. Lauwers engraved the frontispiece and plate of Heraclion and Lucas Vorsterman the Younger the remaining 9 plates. He further engraved a map of the city of Scherpenheuvel.

He made reproductions of Rubens' tapestry cartoons for the series on the Eucharist commissioned around 1625 by Isabella Clara Eugenia for the monastery of the Descalzas Reales in Madrid (Elijah and the Angel, The Defenders of the Eucharist and The Four Evangelists). He engraved Rubens' Marriage of the Virgin after an engraving by Schelte a Bolswert.

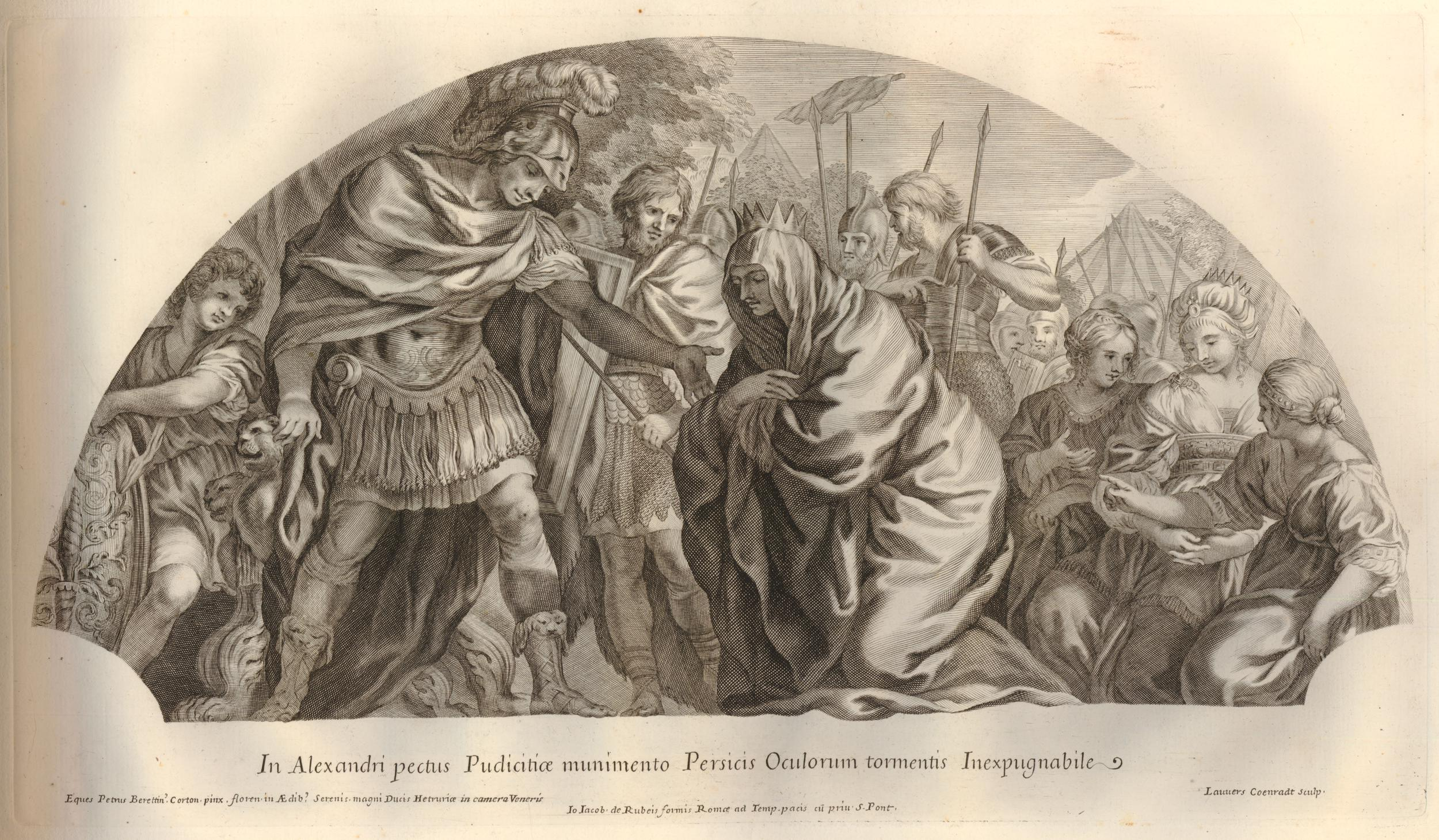
Sisygambis kneeling before Alexander the Great, after Pietro da Cortona

He made an engraving after one of the frescoes in the series of lunettes painted by Pietro da Cortona in the Sala di Venere of the Palazzo Pitti in Florence. The print was published by Giovanni Giacomo de Rossi around 1677 in Rome as part of series of 15 unnumbered prints after other frescoes of Pietro da Cortona in the Palazzo Pitti. Other printmakers who worked on this series include Cornelis Bloemaert, Albert Clouwet, Jacques Blondeau, Lambert Visscher, Charles de La Haye, Jean Gerardin, François Spierre and Pierre Simon also contributed to this series entitled Heroicae Virtutis Imagines quas eques Petrus Beretinus pinxit Florentiae (Images of heroic deeds painted by the knight Pietro Berrettini in Florence).
