= Jacques Blondeau =

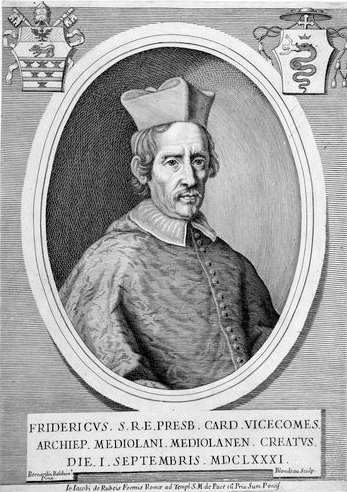
Engraved portrait of Cardinal Federico Visconti, 1681

Jacques Blondeau (alternative names: Jacomo Blondel, Hansje Blondeau, Jacobus Blondeau, Jean Jacques Blondeau, Jacques Blondel; nickname: Weyman; 9 May 1655 – 1698) was a Flemish Baroque engraver who after training in Antwerp spent most of his career in the Papal States.

== Life ==
He was born in Antwerp on 9 May 1655. He was a pupil of the Antwerp engraver Frederik Bouttats the Younger. He spent some time in Paris. In 1675, he traveled to Rome where he continued to live and work for the rest of his life.

He became a member of the Bentvueghels, an association of mainly Dutch and Flemish artists working in Rome. His nickname in the Bentvueghels was Weyman, meaning 'Meadow man'. Blondeau was a very active member of the association and his name appears twice in the history of the Bentvueghels. He wrote his name in red chalk in one of the niches in the church of Santa Costanza where the Bentvueghels used to congregate: jacobus Blondeau / alias de weymyn. His name also appears on a list of members of the Bentvueghels, who were present at the inauguration of the new members Abraham Genoels II, François Moens and Pieter Verbrugghen II. This inauguration is also mentioned by early biographer Arnold Houbraken.

He died in Rome in 1698.

== Work ==
He engraved several portraits, including that of Pope Urban VIII and various cardinals in Rome.

He spent some time in Florence where he is said to have made several engravings, together with Abraham Bloemaert and François Spierre after the frescos by Pietro da Cortona in the Palazzo Pitti.
