= Barbara Lauwers =

American lawyer

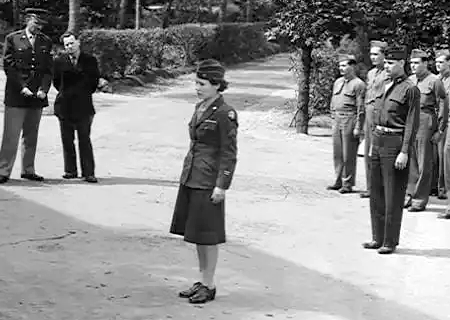
- Barbara Lauwers receiving the Bronze Star
- Born: Bozena Hauserova; April 22, 1914; Austro-Hungarian Monarchy
- Died: August 16, 2009 (aged 95)

Barbara Lauwers (April 22, 1914 – August 16, 2009), later known as Barbara Lauwers Podoski, was a corporal in the Women's Army Corps (WAC) and a recipient of the Bronze Star after one of her operations led to the defection of 600 soldiers from behind Italian lines and the withdrawal of their support from the Germans. She was stationed at the Office of Strategic Services (OSS) Morale Operations (MO) headquarters in Rome, Italy.

== Background ==
Barbara Lauwers was born Božena Hauserová in 1914 in Brno, then Austro-Hungarian Monarchy. She became a lawyer and just before the break out of war she also became a journalist. Lauwers got married and she and her husband moved to Belgian Congo in 1939 when events started to escalate in Europe. In 1941 they moved to the United States. After the bombing of Pearl Harbor, her husband joined the army and she went to work at the Czech embassy in Washington, D.C. before joining the WAC herself. She was sent to Algeria and then Rome, Italy where she pursued her work at the Morale Ops. (MO) (PsyOps psychological warfare).

== World War II work ==
While in Rome, Corporal Lauwers assembled a team of German prisoners to work in counterintelligence and psychological warfare. The prisoners worked as “cobblers”— spies who create false passports, visas, diplomas and other documents. She conducted Operation Sauerkraut, which infiltrated enemy lines with teams of German prisoners that spread “black” propaganda regarding Hitler throughout occupied Italian towns.

Lauwers was part of many successful campaigns, but her most revered stint occurred by chance while overhearing a German prisoner talk about Czech and Slovak soldiers attached to their command, who were relegated to menial work. Lauwers used Czech and Slovak typewriters available at the Vatican to create two leaflets – one in each language. The message she wrote – that Czech and Slovak soldiers were being used by the Germans, so they should reclaim their self-respect by joining the partisans – was mass-produced and also broadcast on the BBC. Within a week hundreds of Czechs and Slavs crossed over to Allied lines, at least 600 showing the leaflets she produced. This operation was the reason that Corporal Lauwers was given the Bronze Star.

Corporal Lauwers also created the "League of Lonely War Women" or VEK in German. This mythical organization was to demoralize German troops by making them believe that the females in their lives back home were having casual relations with other soldiers. Eight faked field post letters in the German language were produced by the OSS in Italy with the total number of forged field post letters that were printed in Rome being indicated in an OSS production report. 287,000 copies were produced in the period between 15 July 1944 and the end of the war. The operation was so successful that The Washington Post was fooled and ran a story on 10 October 1944 entitled, “German soldiers on leave from the Italian front have only to pin an entwined heart on their lapel during furloughs home to find a girlfriend.” The newspaper got the story from a circular which had been captured on the Eighth Army front and was actually written by Lauwers and carried behind German lines by the Sauerkraut agents.

== Propaganda ==
League of Lonely Hearts Letter (translated):

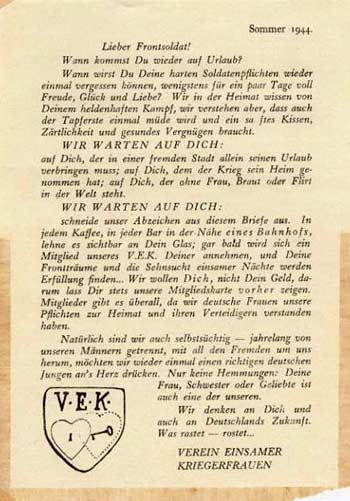
League of Lonely War Women Leaflet. psywar

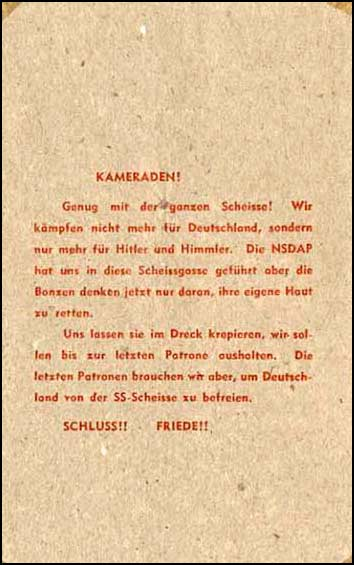
MO Toilet Paper. Originated from psywar

Summer 1944

Dear frontline soldier!

When will you have leave again?
When will you be able to forget your arduous soldier's duties for a while, for a few days of joy, happiness and love? We at home know of your heroic struggle. We understand that even the bravest gets tired sometime and need a soft pillow, tenderness and healthy enjoyment.
WE ARE WAITING FOR YOU:
For you who must spend your leave in a foreign town; for you whom the war has deprived of a home; for you who is alone in the world without a wife, fiancée or a flirt.
WE ARE WAITING FOR YOU:
Cut our symbol from this letter. In every coffee shop, in every bar near a railway station, place it to your glass so that it can be clearly seen. A member of our VEK will soon contact you. The dreams you had at the front, and the longings of your lonely nights, will be fulfilled... We want you, not your money. Therefore, you should always let us show you our membership card in advance. There are members everywhere, because we women understand our duties to the homeland and to its defenders.
We, of course, are selfish too – we have been separated from our men for many years. With all those foreigners around us, we would like once more to press a real German youth to our bosom. No inhibitions now: Your wife, sister, or lover is one of us as well.

We think of you and Germany's future.

Which rests – rusts.

ASSOCIATION OF LONELY WAR WOMEN.

== Legacy ==
In May 2015, Barbara Lauwers Podoski was posthumously inducted as a Distinguished Member of the United States Army's Psychological Operations Regiment during a ceremony at the U.S. Army John F. Kennedy Special Warfare Center and School at Fort Bragg, North Carolina, in recognition of her contributions to psychological warfare during World War II with the Office of Strategic Services’ Morale Operations branch.
