= Abraham Bloemaert =

Dutch painter (1566–1651)

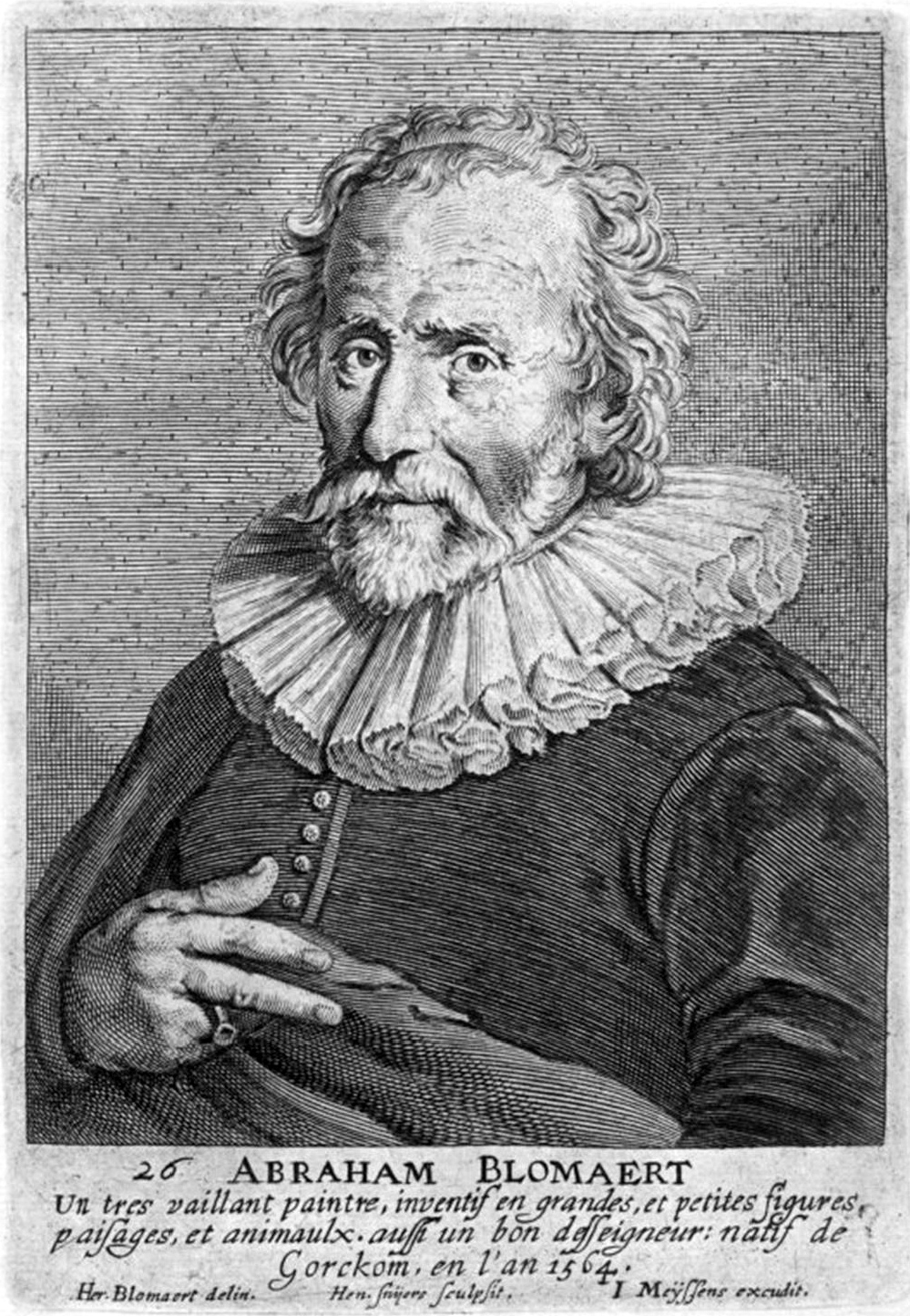
- Abraham Bloemaert by Hendrick Snyers for Het Gulden Cabinet, p. 45
- Born: Abraham Bloemaert; 25 December 1566; Gorinchem
- Died: 27 January 1651 (aged 84); Utrecht
- Education: Hieronymus Francken among others
- Known for: Printmaking, paintings
- Movement: Northern Mannerism and Dutch Baroque painting

Abraham Bloemaert (25 December 1566 – 27 January 1651) was a Dutch painter and printmaker who used etching and engraving. He initially worked in the style of the "Haarlem Mannerists", but by the beginning of the 17th-century altered his style in line with the new Baroque style that was then developing. He mostly painted history subjects and some landscapes. He was an important teacher, training most of the Utrecht Caravaggisti.

== Life ==
Bloemaert was born in Gorinchem, Habsburg Netherlands, the son of the architect Cornelis Bloemaert I, who moved his family to Utrecht in 1575, where Abraham was first a pupil of Gerrit Splinter (pupil of Frans Floris) and of Joos de Beer. From the age of 15 or 16, he spent three years in Paris (1581–1583), studying for six weeks under a Jehan Bassot (possibly Jean Cousin the Younger) and then under a Maistre Herry. While in the School of Fontainebleau he received further training from his fellow countryman Hieronymus Francken. He returned to Utrecht in 1583, just before the French Wars of Religion began, which destroyed much of the work at the Chateau of Fontainebleau.

When his father was appointed city architect (stads-bouwmeester) in Amsterdam in 1591 Bloemaert accompanied him there. On his father's death in 1593 he returned to Utrecht, where he set up a workshop and in 1594 became dean ("deken") of the "zadelaarsgilde".{{efn=As of 1367 painters were included in the saddlemakers' guild, with no Guild of St. Luke of their own. However, in 1611, along with the two other leading Utrecht painters, Joachim Wtewael and Paulus Moreelse, he was one of the founders of the Utrecht Guild of Saint Luke (St Lucas-gilde), a new Utrecht painters' guild, and became its deken in 1618.}} Many of Bloemaert's paintings were commissioned by Utrecht's clandestine Catholic churches. He died in Utrecht.

According to the Encyclopædia Britannica Eleventh Edition, "[Bloemaert] excelled more as a colourist than as a draughtsman, was extremely productive, and painted and etched historical and allegorical pictures, landscapes, still-life, animal pictures and flower pieces". In the first decade of the 17th-century, Bloemaert began formulating his landscape paintings to include picturesque ruined cottages and other pastoral elements. In these works, religious or mythological figures play a subordinate role. Country life was to remain Bloemaert's favourite subject, which he depicted with increasing naturalism. He drew motifs such as peasant cottages, dovecotes and trees from life and then on his return to the studio worked them up into complex imaginary scenes.

Among his many pupils were his four sons, Hendrick, Frederick, Cornelis, and Adriaan (all of whom achieved considerable reputations as painters or engravers). The Netherlands Institute for Art History (RKD) also lists as his pupils: Jan Aerntsz de Hel, Abraham Jacobsz van Almeloveen, Cornelius de Beer, Nicolaes van Bercheyck, Jan van Bijlert, the two Boths, the two Honthorsts, Leonaert Bramer, Bartholomeus Breenbergh, Hendrick ter Brugghen, Jacob Gerritsz Cuyp, Willem van Drielenburg, Wybrand de Geest, Nicolaus Knüpfer, Hendrik Munnicks, Frederick Pithan, Cornelis van Poelenburch, Henrik Schook, Anthoni Ambrosius Schouten, Robert Jansz Splinter, Matthias Stom, Herman van Swanevelt, Dirck Voorst, Quintijnus de Waerdt, Jan Baptist Weenix, and Peter Petersz van Zanen.

== Works ==
=== Public collections ===
Bloemaert is represented in numerous art collections including: the Detroit Institute of Arts, Michigan; Fine Arts Museums of San Francisco; Hermitage Museum, Saint Petersburg; Indianapolis Museum of Art, Indiana; J. Paul Getty Museum, Los Angeles; Mauritshuis Royal Picture Gallery, The Hague; Metropolitan Museum of Art, New York City; Minneapolis Institute of Arts, Minnesota; Musée des Beaux-Arts de Rouen; Musée du Louvre, Paris; Museum of Fine Arts, Boston; Museum of Fine Arts of Nancy; Museum of Grenoble; National Gallery of Canada, Ottawa; Rijksmuseum, Amsterdam; Royal Academy of Arts, London; University of Rochester, New York; Bob Jones University, Greenville, South Carolina; Centraal Museum, Utrecht, Netherlands; Museum de Fundatie, Zwolle, Netherlands; Cleveland Museum of Art, Ohio; Courtauld Institute of Art, London; Harvard University Art Museums, Massachusetts; Kunsthalle zu Kiel, Germany; and the Princeton University Art Museum, New Jersey.

== Rediscoveries ==
- Lot and His Daughters (120 x 220 cm), oil on canvas (rediscovered in 2006 by Prof. Alain Béjard & Dimitri Joannidès, Alicem institute, Luxemburg)

== Gallery ==
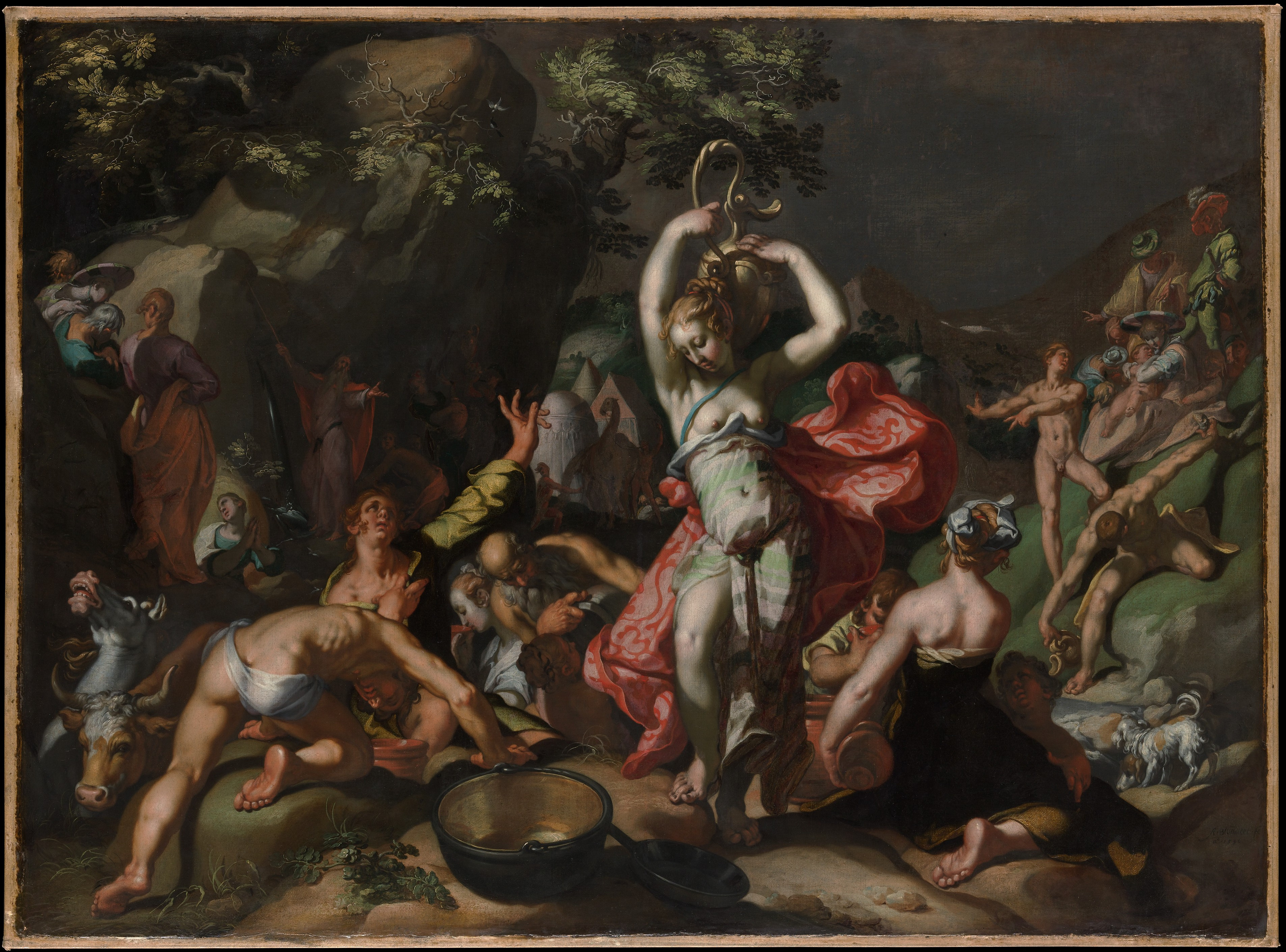
Moses Striking the Rock, 1596, Metropolitan Museum of Art

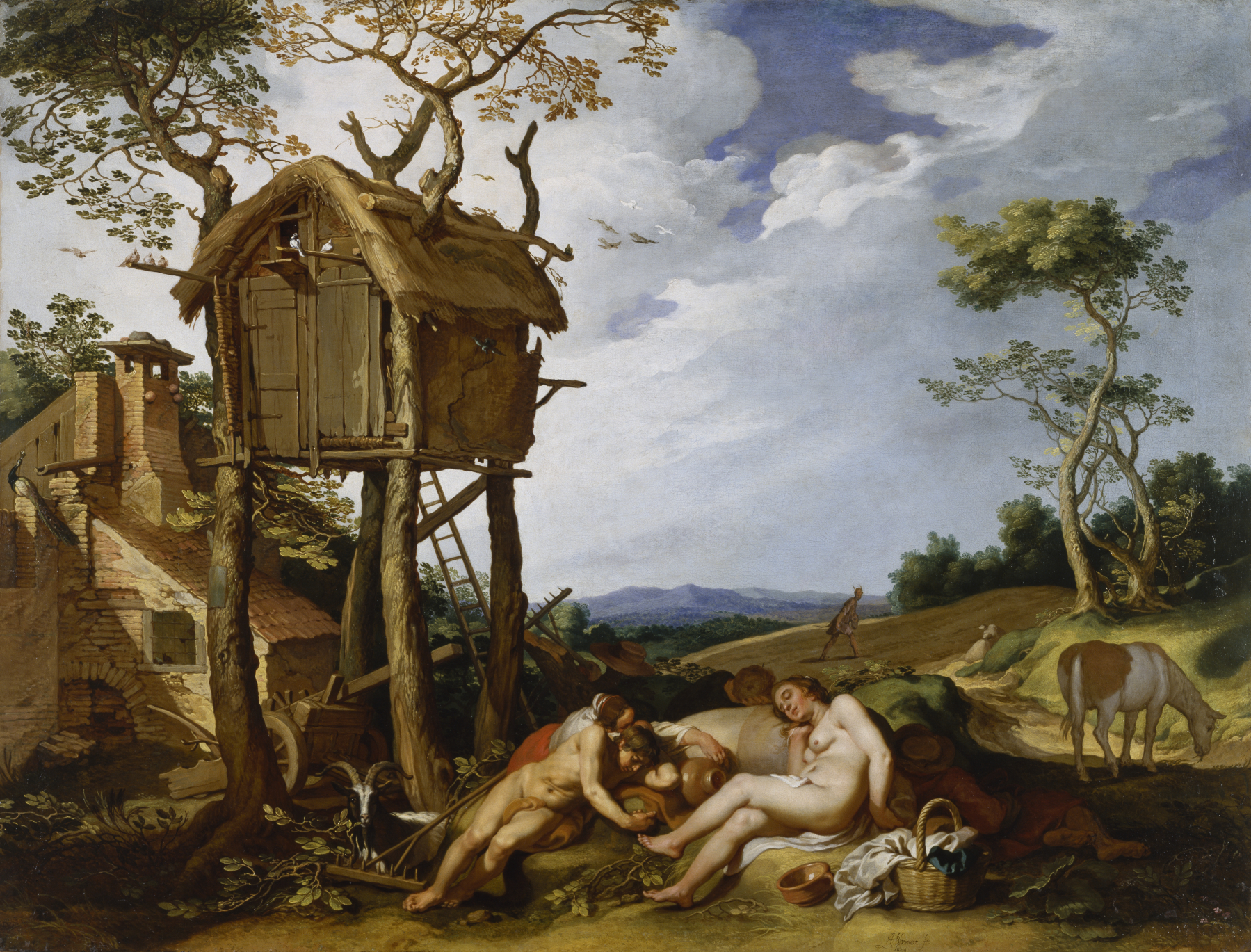
Parable of the Wheat and the Tares, 1624

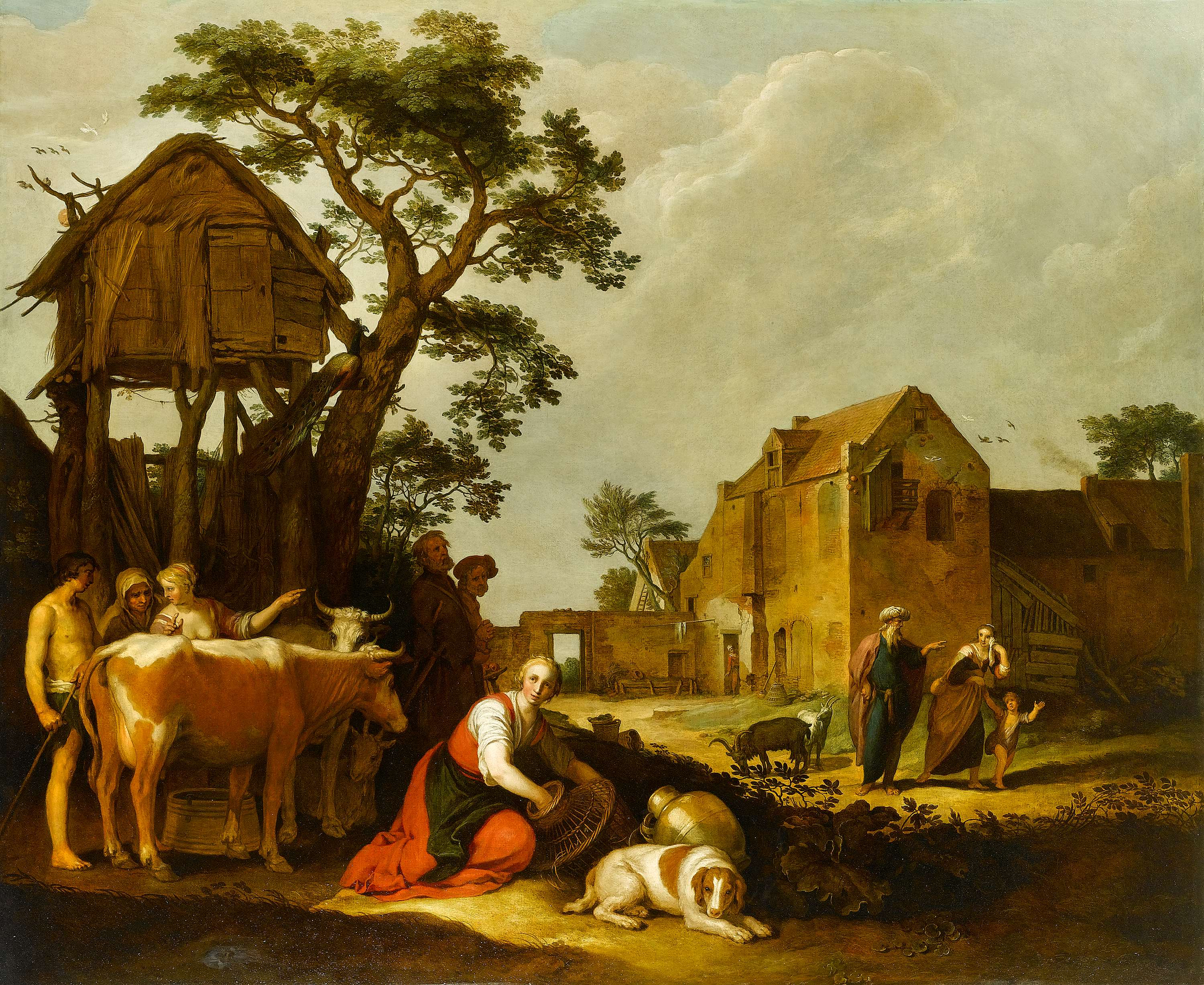
The Expulsion of Hagar and Ishmael, oil on canvas

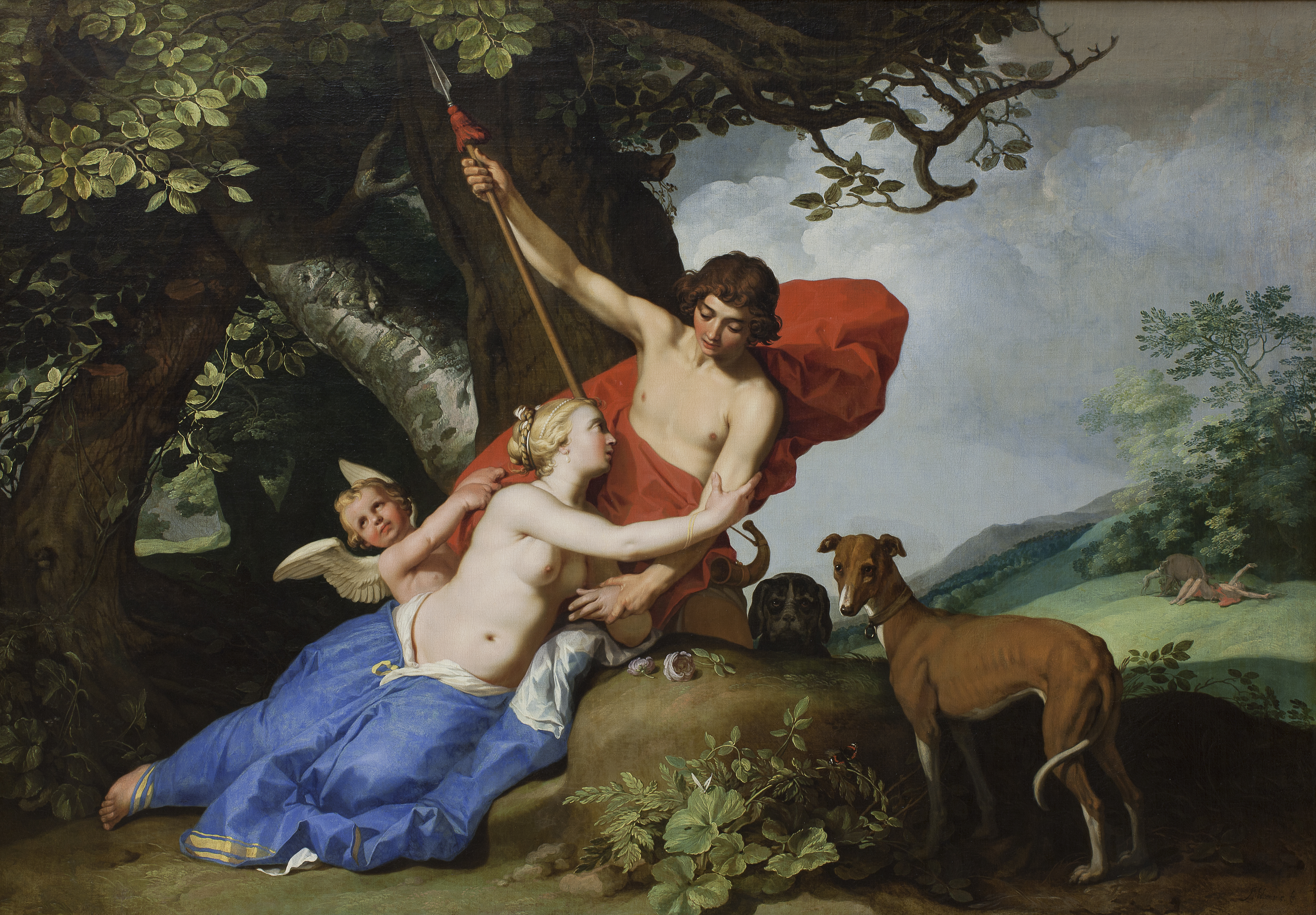
Venus and Adonis, 1632

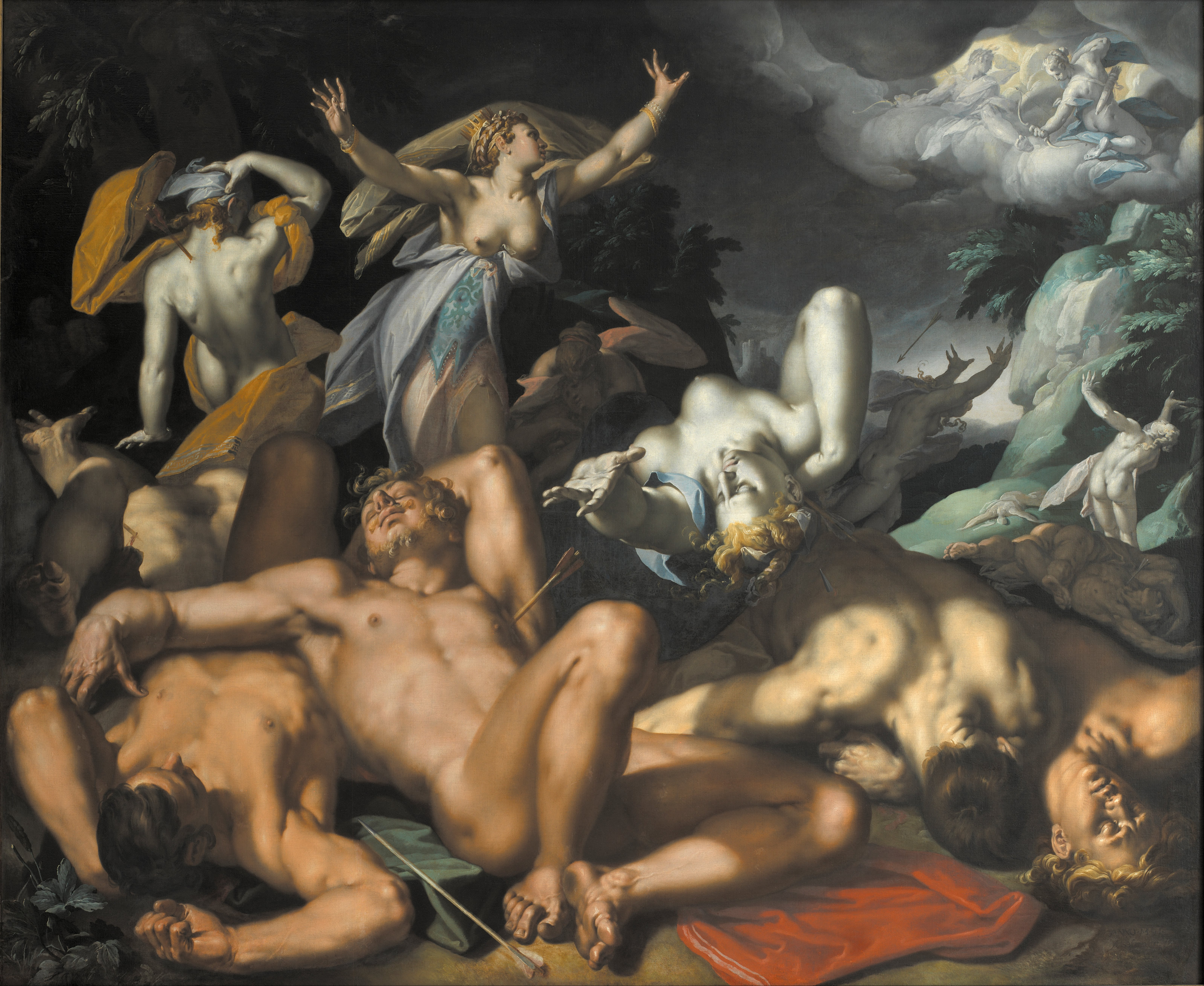
Niobe Mourning Her Children, 1591

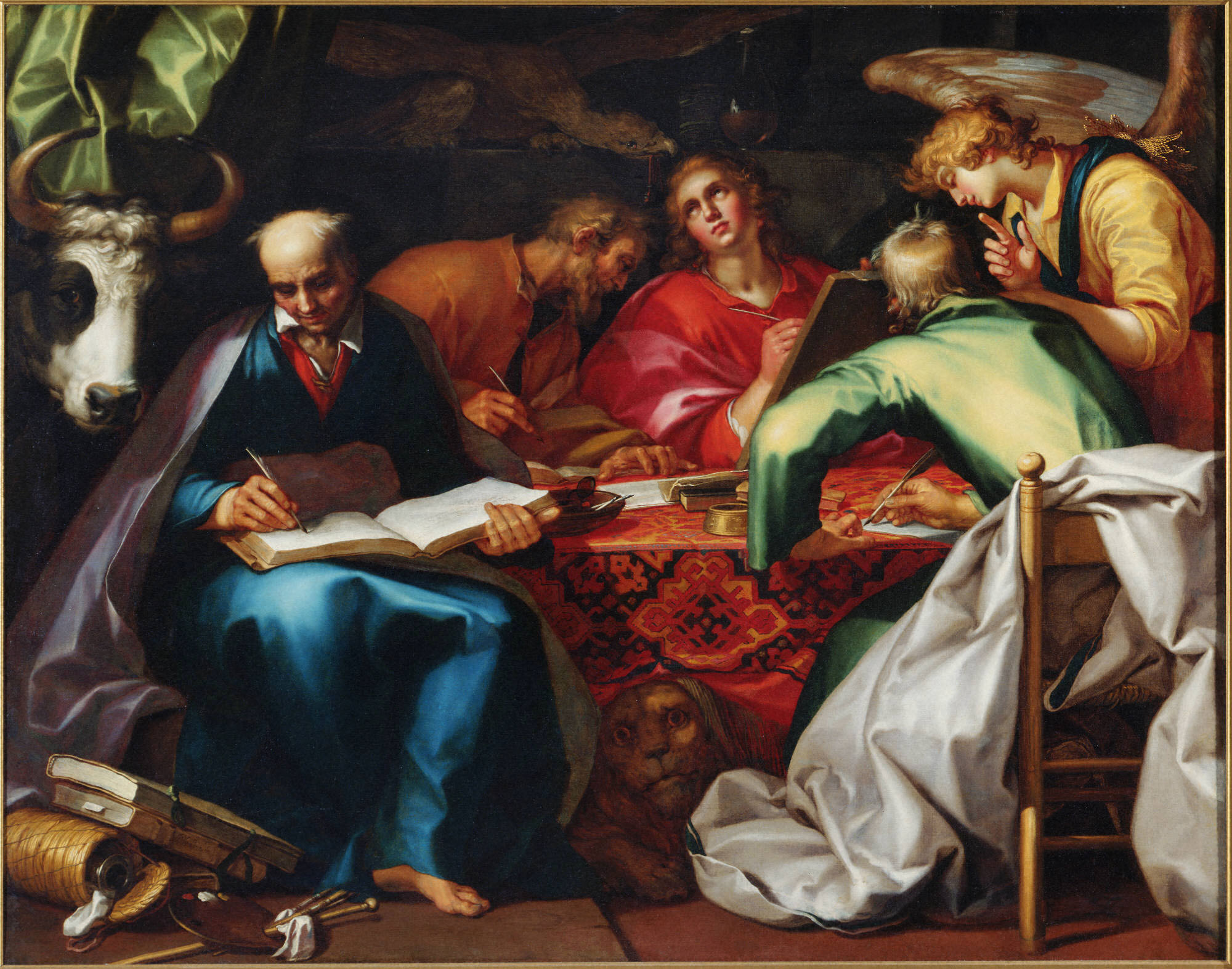
The Four Evangelists, 1615, Princeton University Art Museum

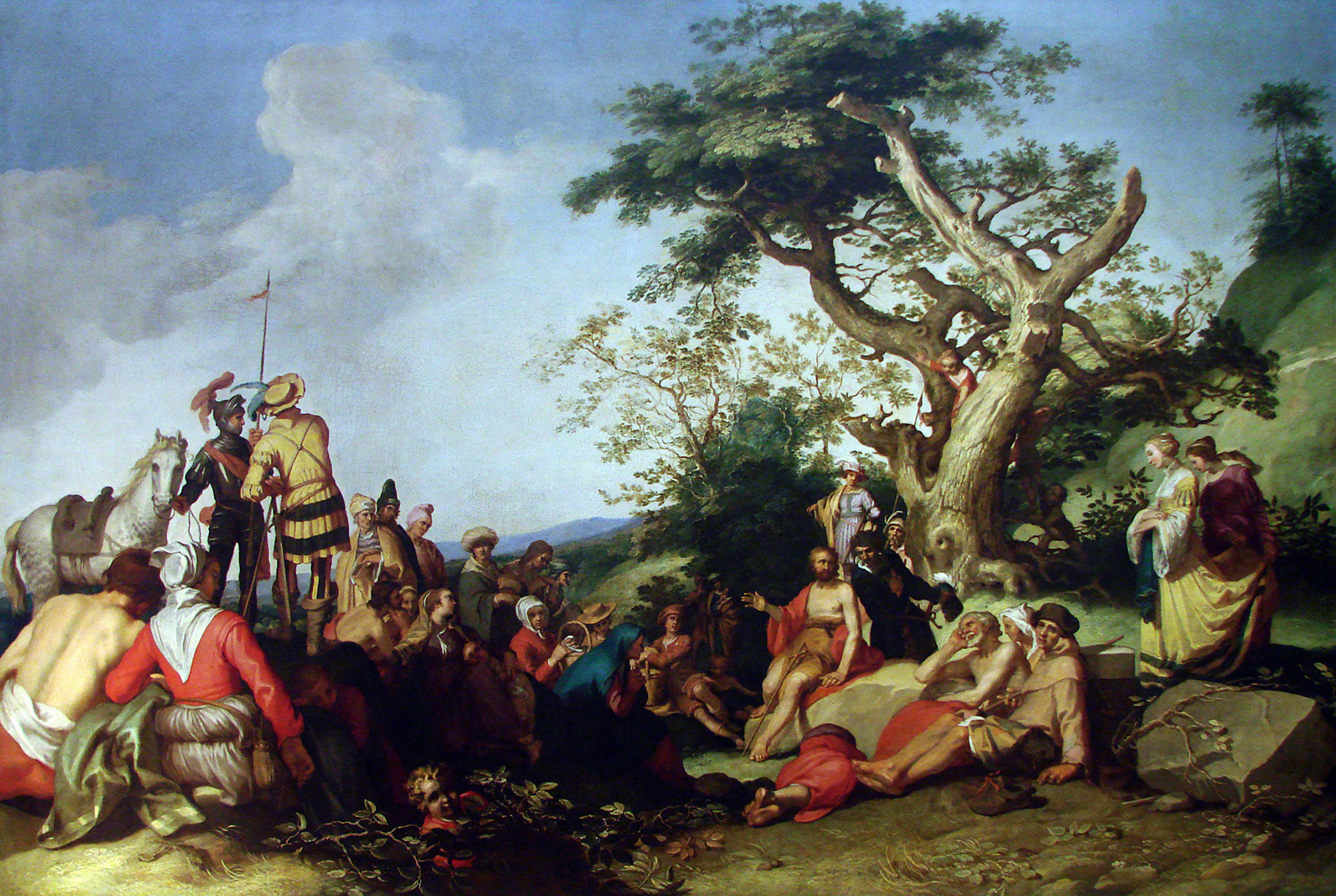
John the Baptist Preaching, c. 1620

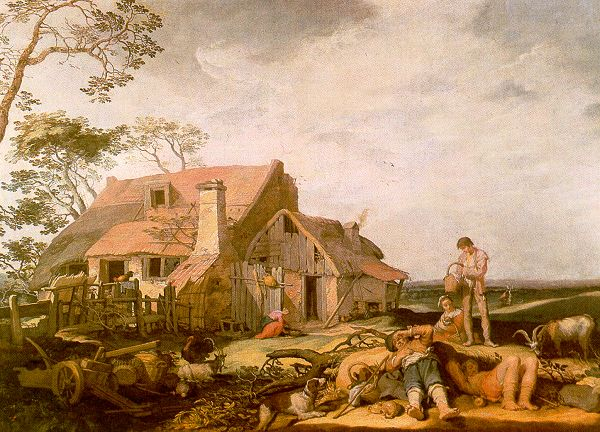
Landscape with Peasants Resting, 1650. Oil on canvas, 91 x 133 cm, Staatliche Museen Berlin

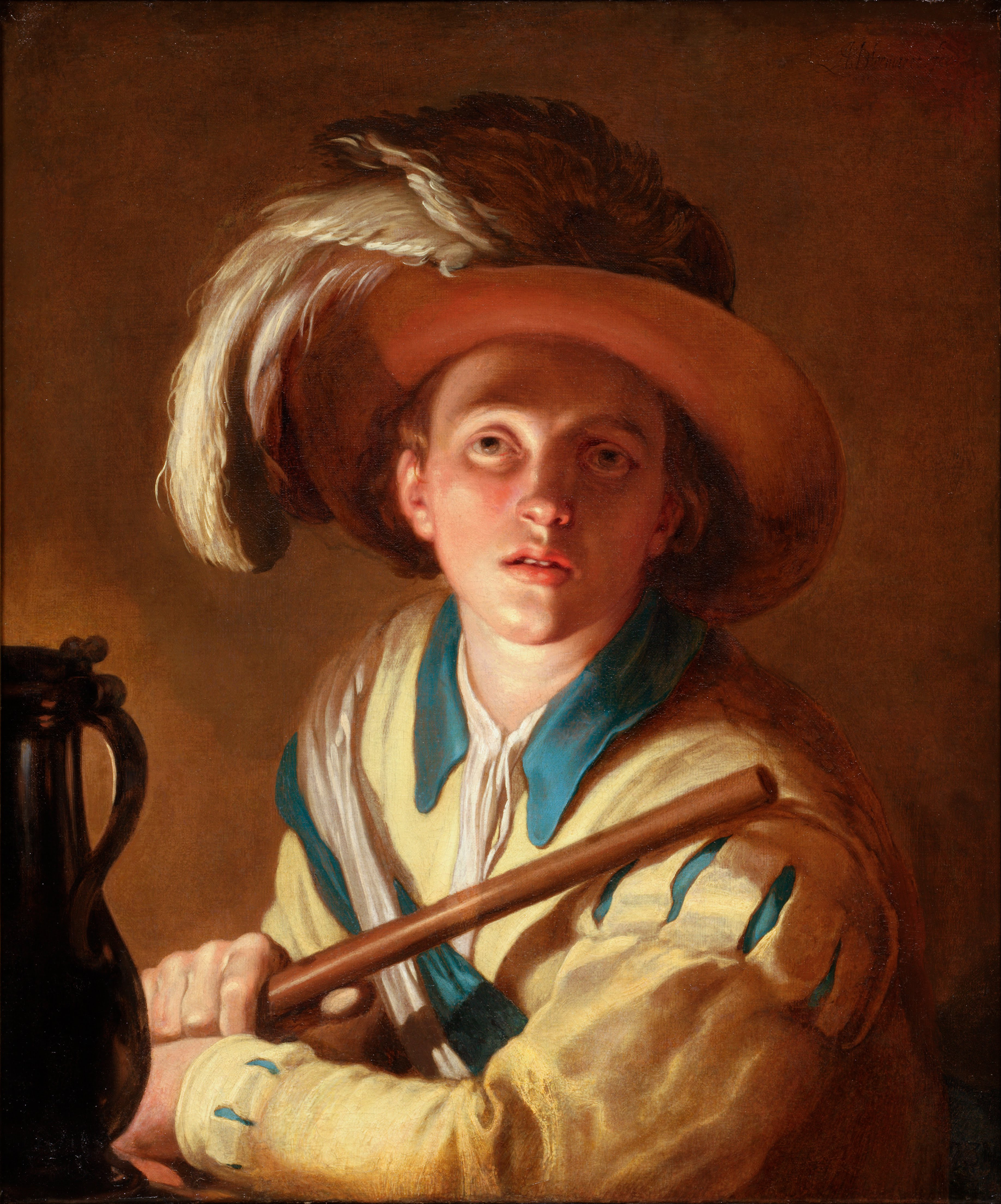
The Flute Player, 1621

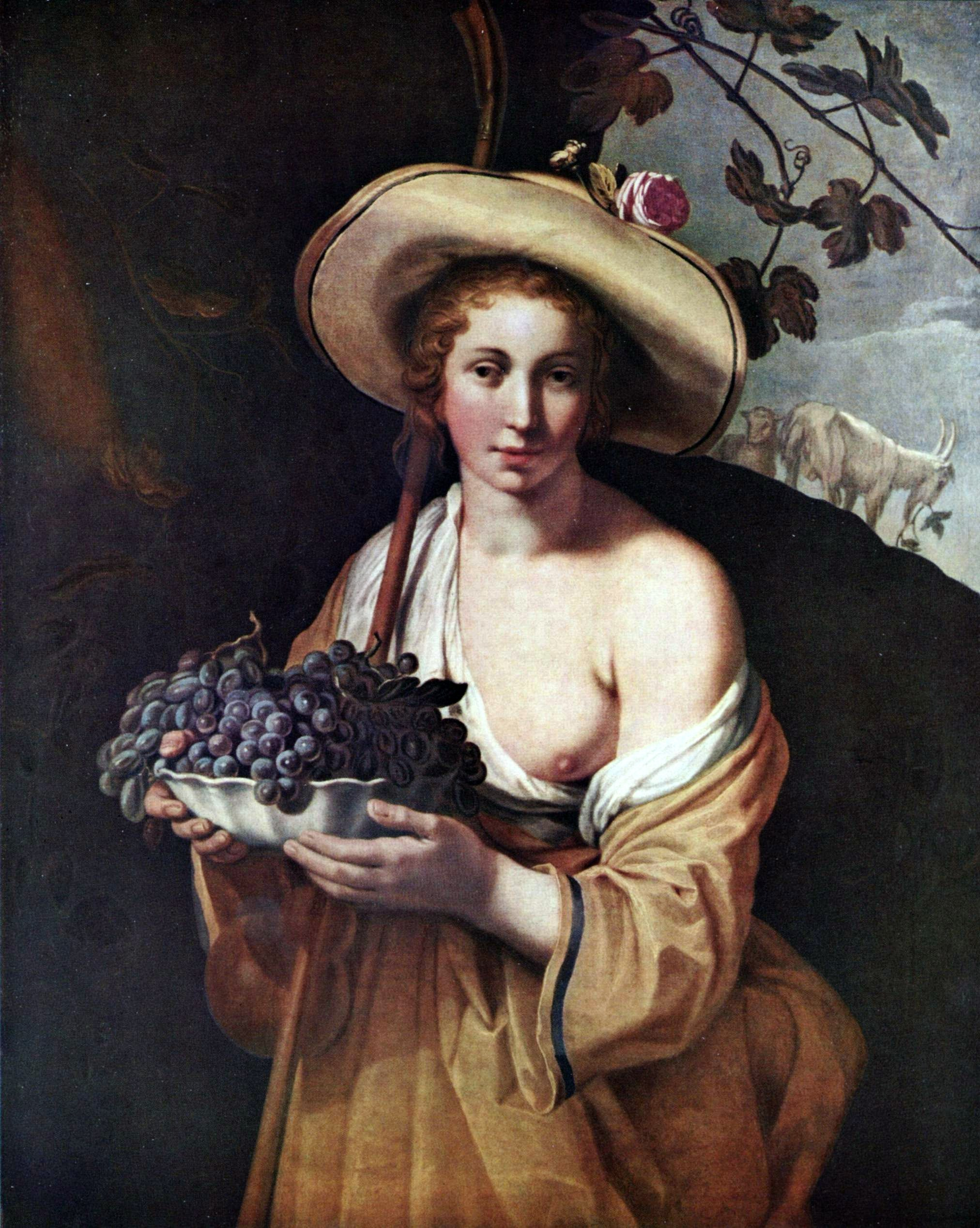
Shepherdess with Grapes, 1628

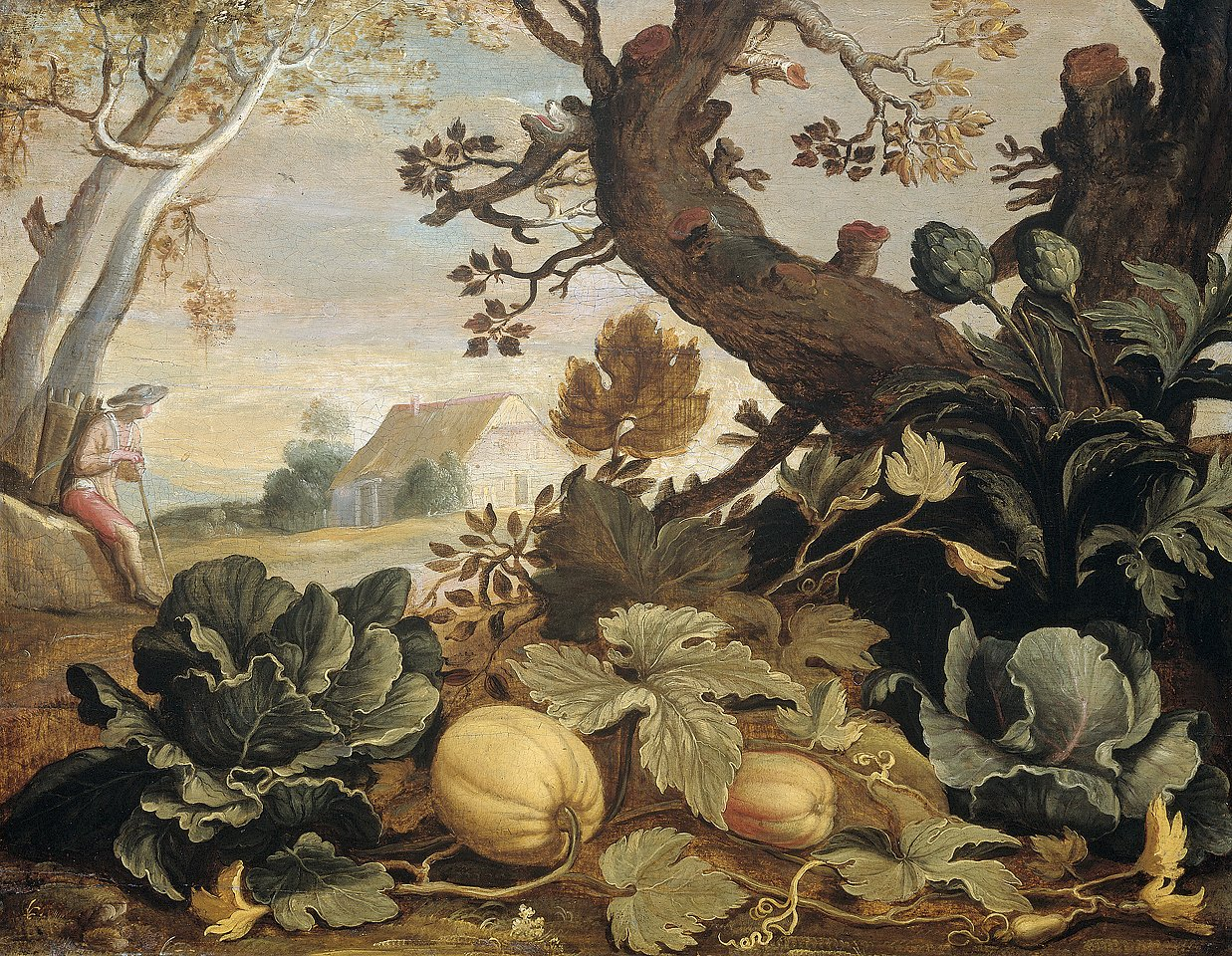
Landscape with Vegetables in the Foreground, uncertain date

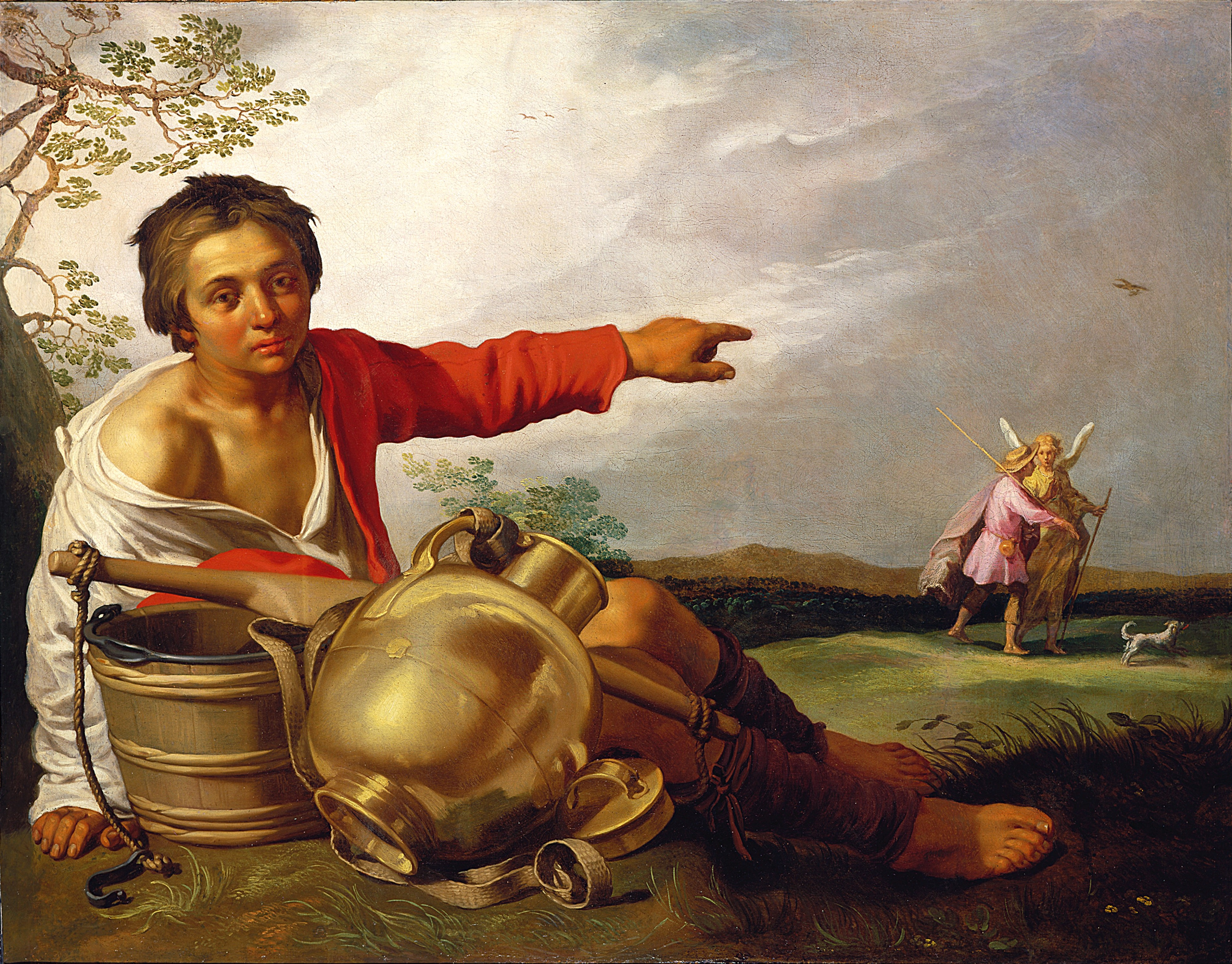
Shepherd Boy Pointing at Tobias and the Angel, c. 1625-1630

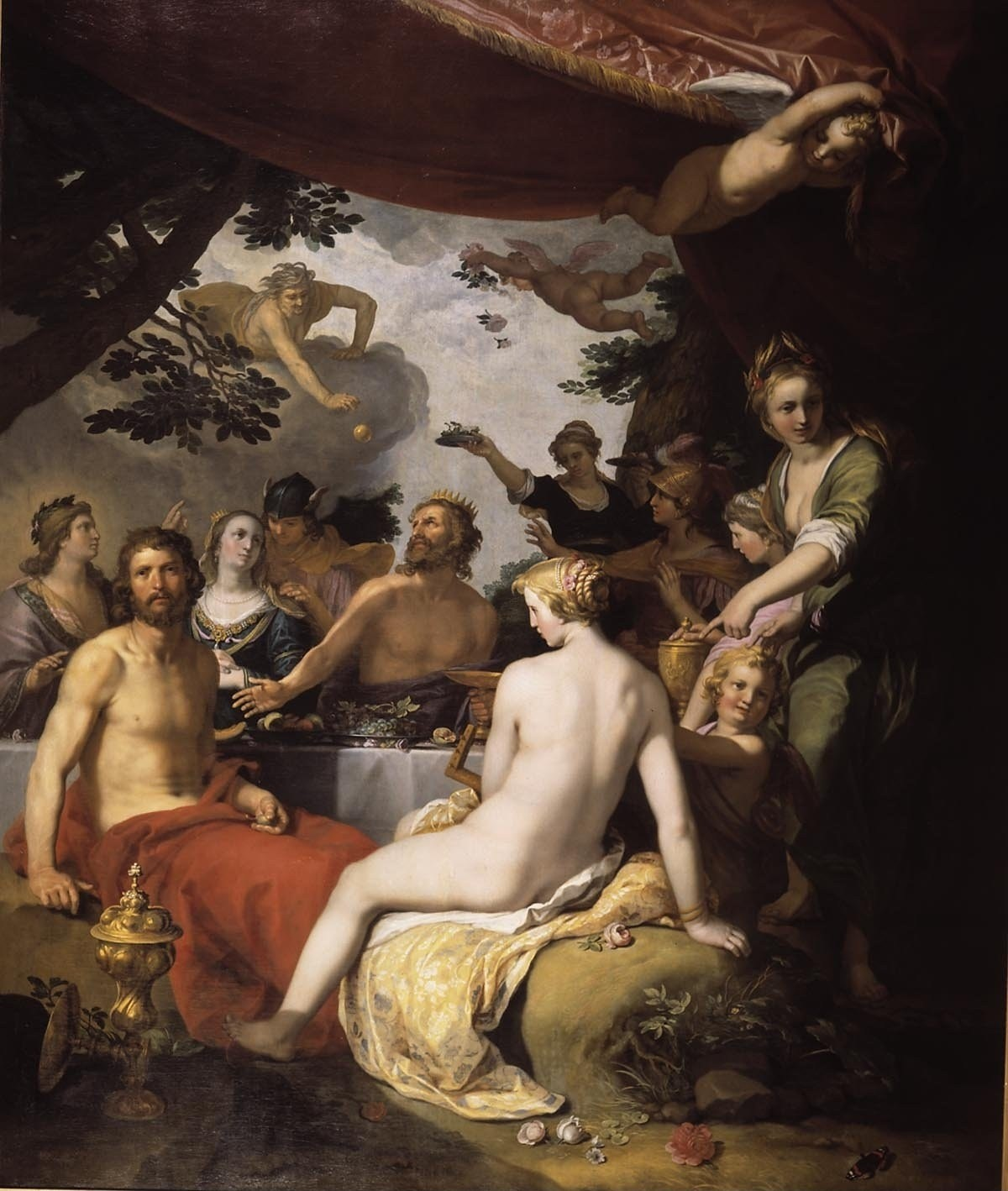
Feast of the Gods at the wedding of Peleus and Thetis, 1638, Mauritshuis

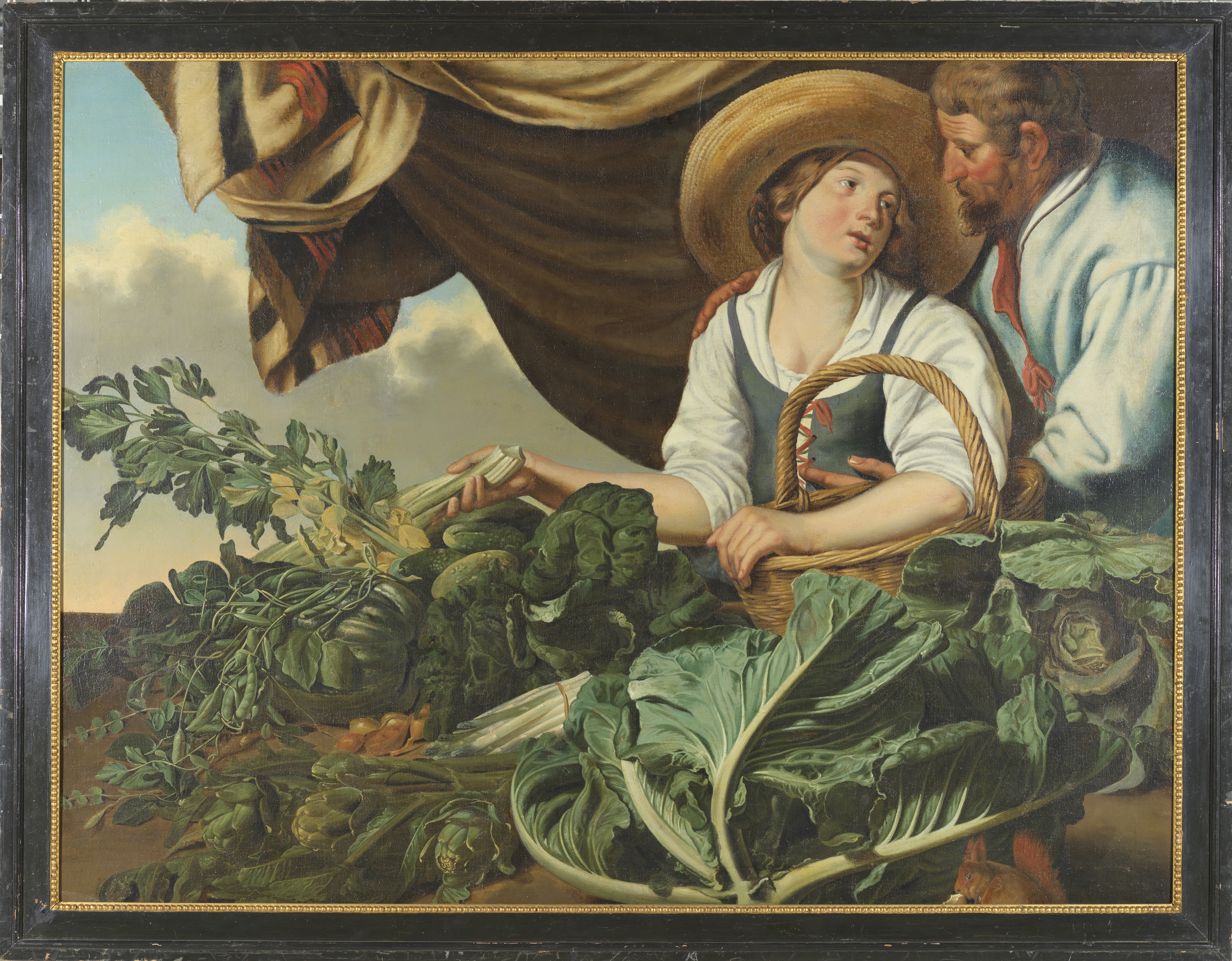
Vegetable Seller, c. 1620-1649, Sörmlands museum

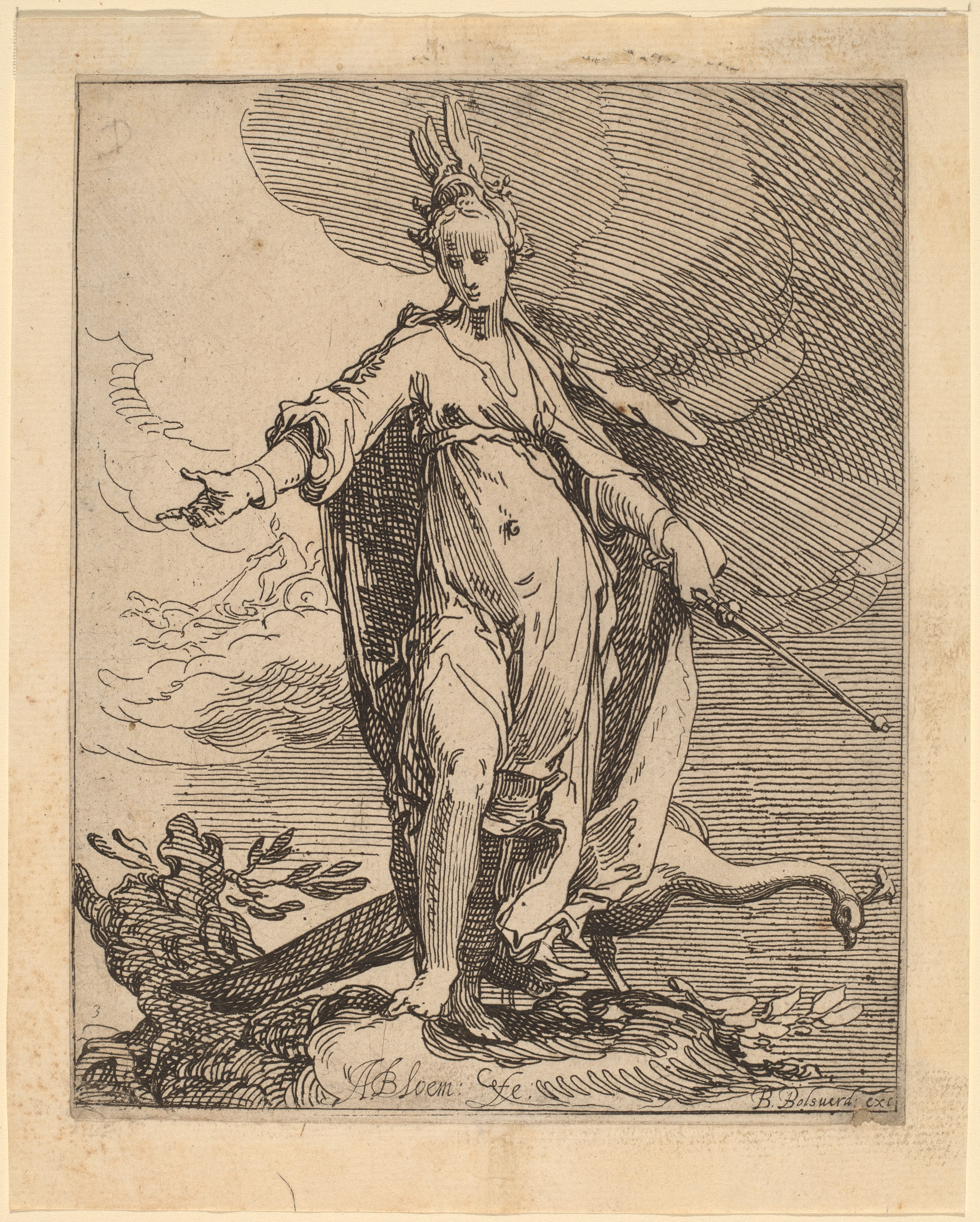
Juno, c. 1610, National Gallery of Art
