= Cornelis Bloemaert =

Dutch Golden Age painter and engraver (1603–1692)

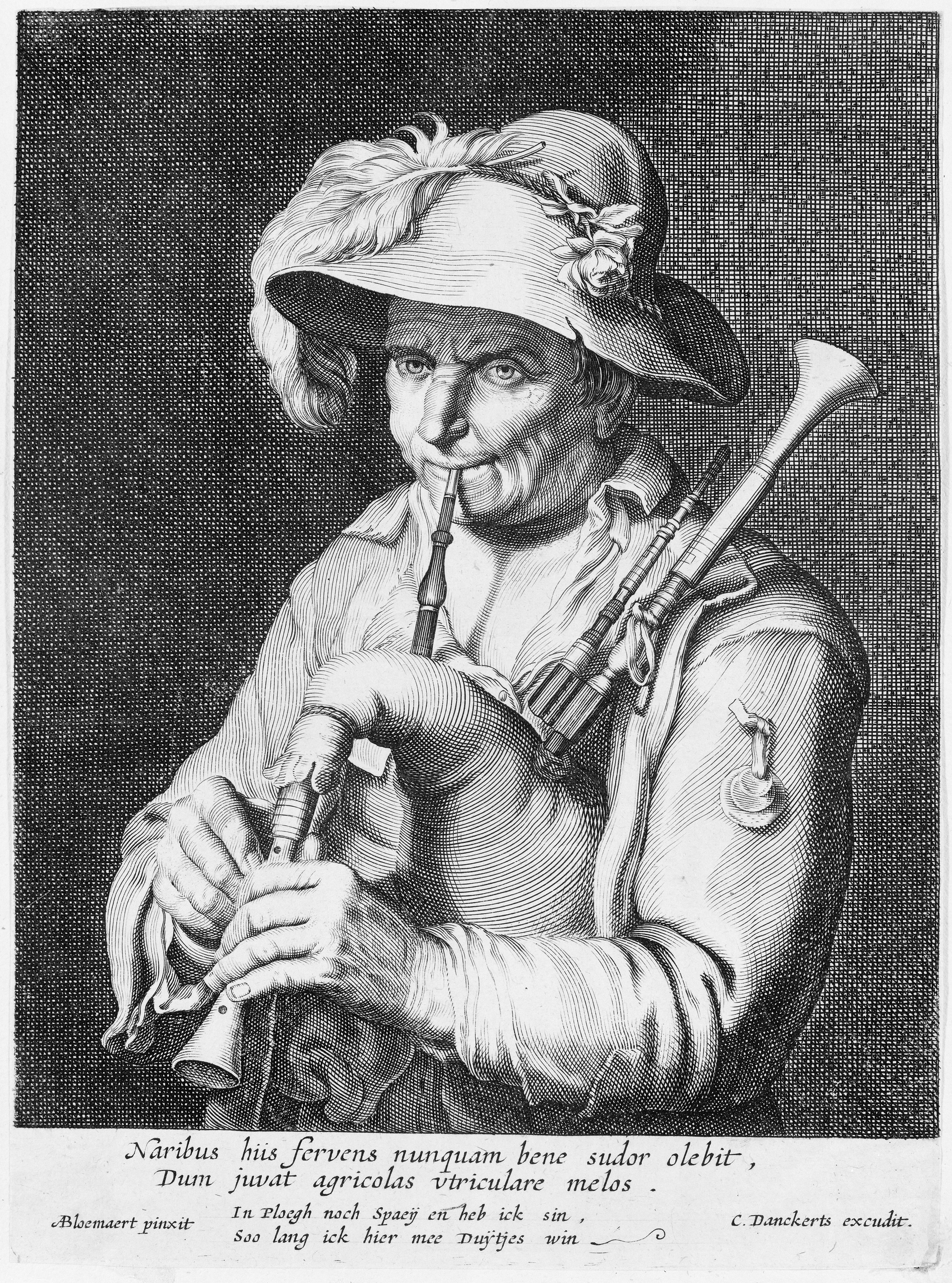
Man Playing Bagpipe, after Abraham Bloemaert

Cornelis Bloemaert II (1603 – 28 September 1692), was a Dutch painter and engraver, who after training in the Dutch Republic worked most of his career in Rome. His workshop in Rome played an important role in spreading Italian art throughout Europe and attracted many young engravers from abroad.

== Biography ==
Bloemaert was born in Utrecht. He studied with his father, Abraham Bloemaert, his brothers Hendrick and Adriaan, and his father's pupil, Gerard van Honthorst. Though originally trained as a painter, he devoted himself primarily to printmaking, which he learned from Crispijn van de Passe. He went to Paris in 1630, where he made engravings from among others, Michel de Marolles's Temple des Muses, before going to Rome in 1633. His chisel can be recognised by the colours' richness and the smoothness of their transitions. Amongst his pupils were Michel Natalis and Gilles Rousselet. Some of his better known engravings are of Annibale Carracci's The Holy Family, Pietro da Cortona's Adoration of the Shepherds, and Rubens' Meleager.

He traveled to Rome, where he made reproductive prints after Italian paintings. In 1659 and 1667 he did frontispiece engravings for Daniello Bartoli's Istoria della Compagnia di Gesu. He was so successful that he stayed there until receiving word that his father wished to see him once more before he died. He delayed his return so long, that his father died, so he remained in Rome until his own death. He was a member of the Bentvueghels, an association of mainly Dutch and Flemish artists active in Rome. It was customary for the Bentvueghels to adopt an appealing nickname, the so-called 'bent name'. Bloemaert was reportedly given the bent name Winter.

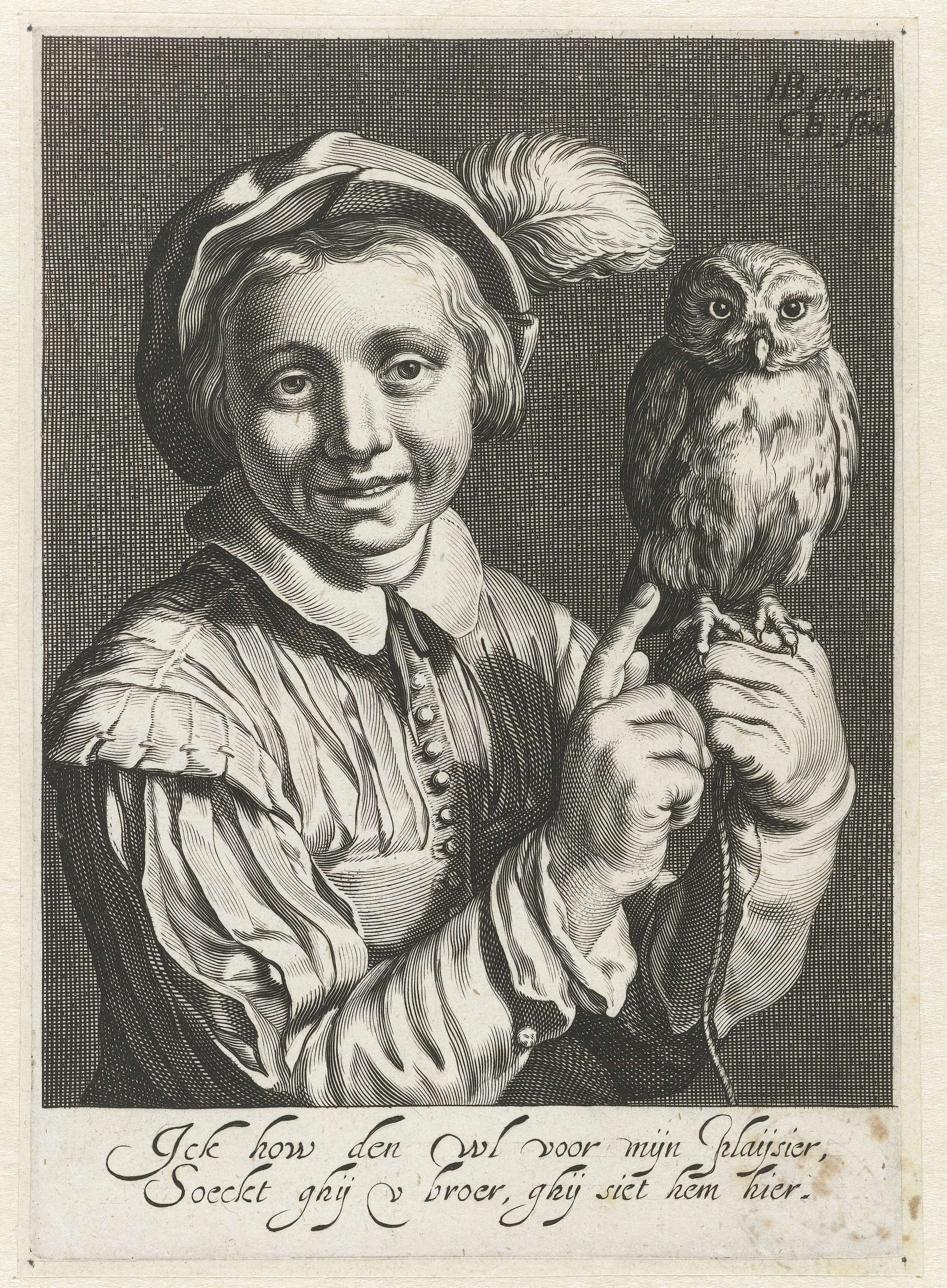
Boy with an owl, after Hendrick Bloemaert

During the period from 1664 to 1677, he worked with other engravers on reproductions of the Pietro da Cortona frescoes in the Palazzo Pitti in Florence. These prints were published by Giovanni Giacomo de Rossi around 1677 in Rome as part of a series of 15 unnumbered prints entitled Heroicae Virtutes Imagines quas eques Petrus Beretinus pinxit Florentiae (Images of heroic deeds painted by the painted by the knight Pietro Berrettini of Florence). Other printmakers who worked on this series include Coenraed Lauwers, Albert Clouwet, Jacques Blondeau, Lambert Visscher, Charles de La Haye, Jean Gerardin, François Spierre and Pierre Simon.

He died in Rome where he was buried on 28 September 1692.
