= Hendrick Snyers =

Flemish engraver (1611–1644)

Hendrick Snyers (1611, Antwerp – 1644, Antwerp), was a Flemish Baroque engraver.

== Biography ==
Snyers was a pupil of Nicolaes Lauwers in 1635–1636. In 1643 he promised to work for the history painter Abraham van Diepenbeeck for three years.

He is known for his engraved portraits of Adam van Noort and Abraham Bloemaert in "Het Gulden Cabinet"

He was also known as Hendrik Snayers and Hendrik Snijers.

== Gallery ==
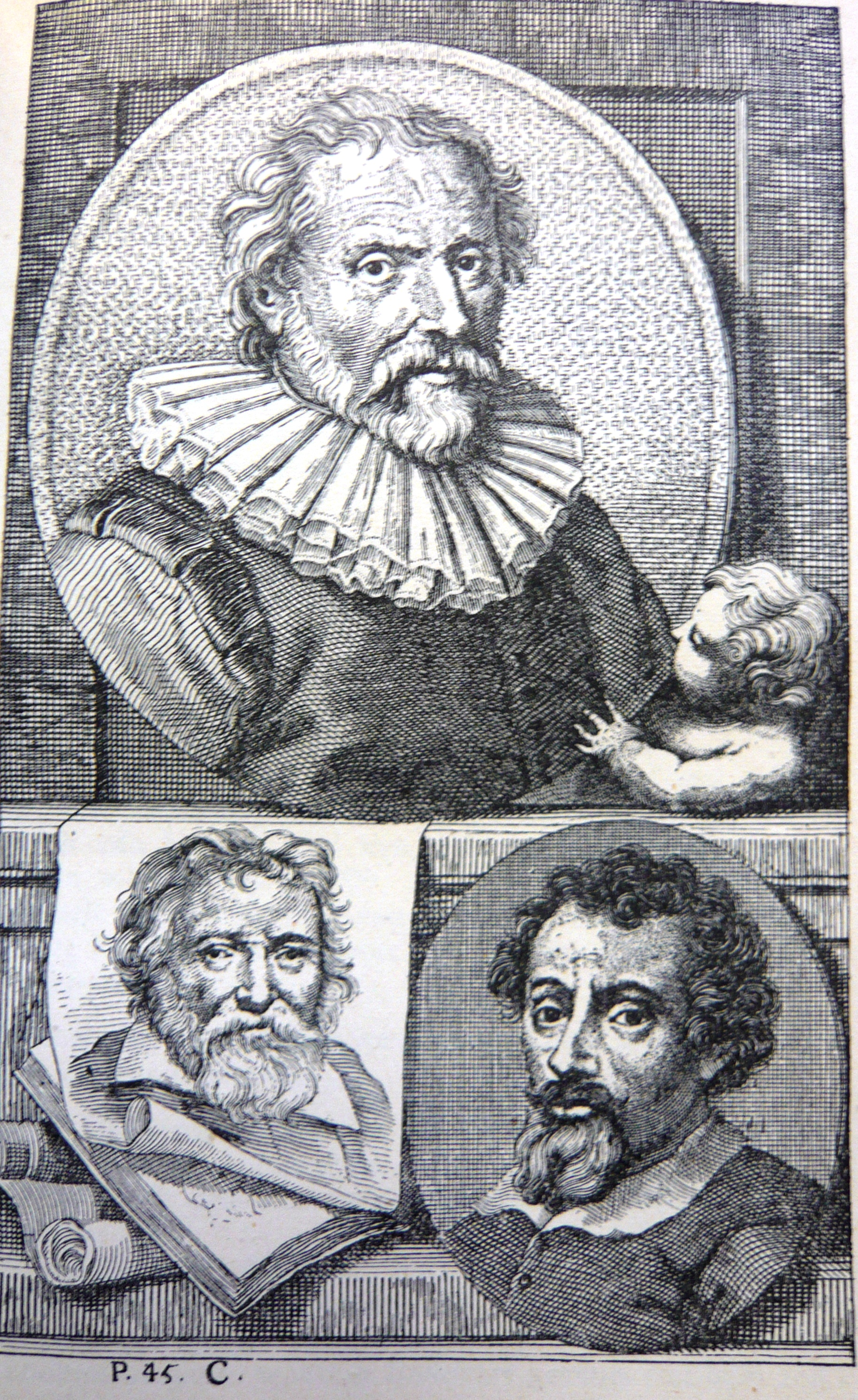
Jacob Houbraken's engraving of Abraham Bloemaert (top) and Adam van Noort (lower left), on page 44 of Part 1 of Arnold Houbraken's Schouburg from 1718

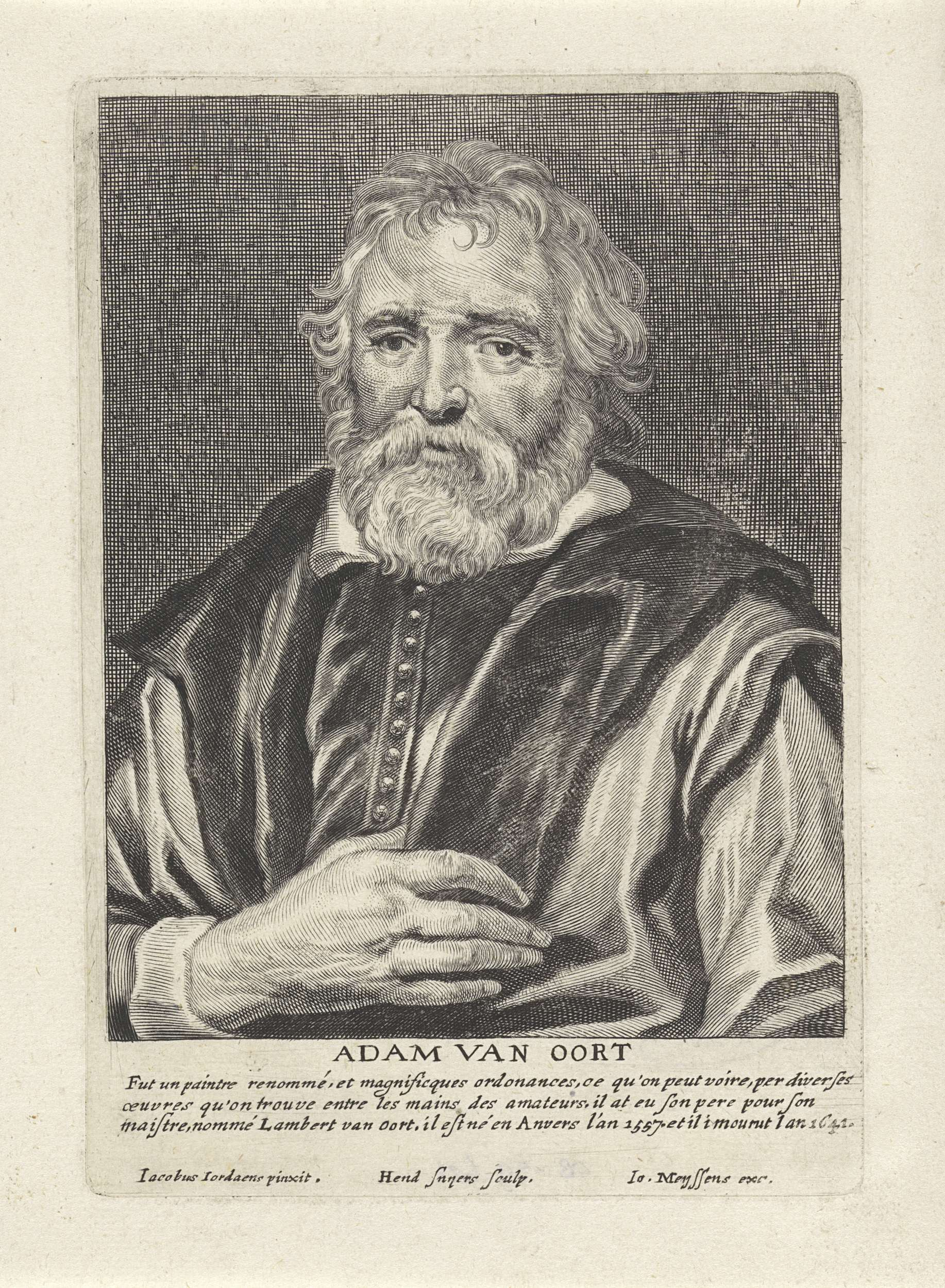
Adam van Noort by Hendrick Snyers & Jan Meyssens on page 17 of "Het Gulden Cabinet" from 1662 based on a painting by Jacob Jordaens

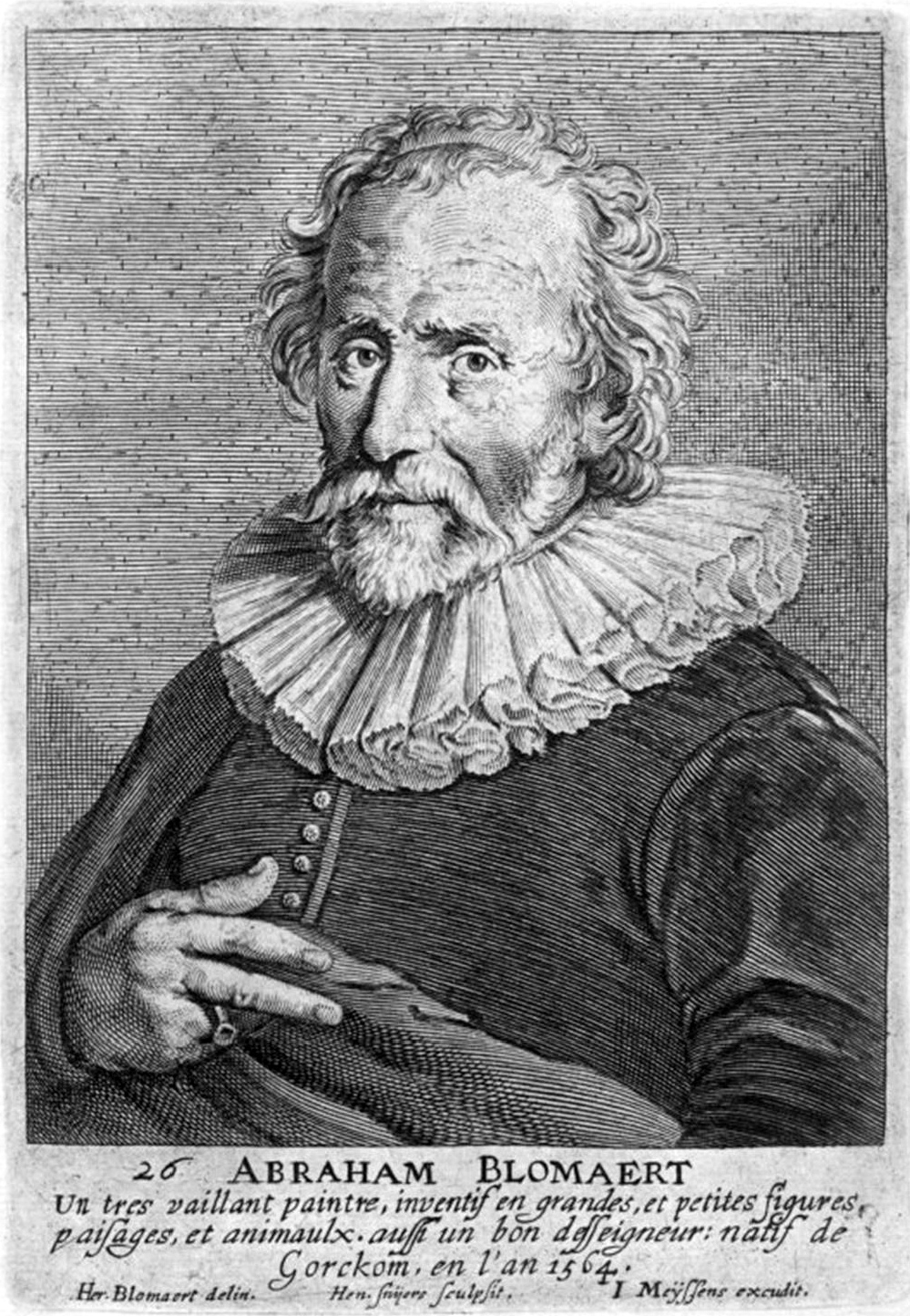
Abraham Bloemaert by Hendrik Snyers & Jan Meyssens on page 45 of "Het Gulden Cabinet"
