= Hendrick Bloemaert =

17th-century Dutch Golden Age painter

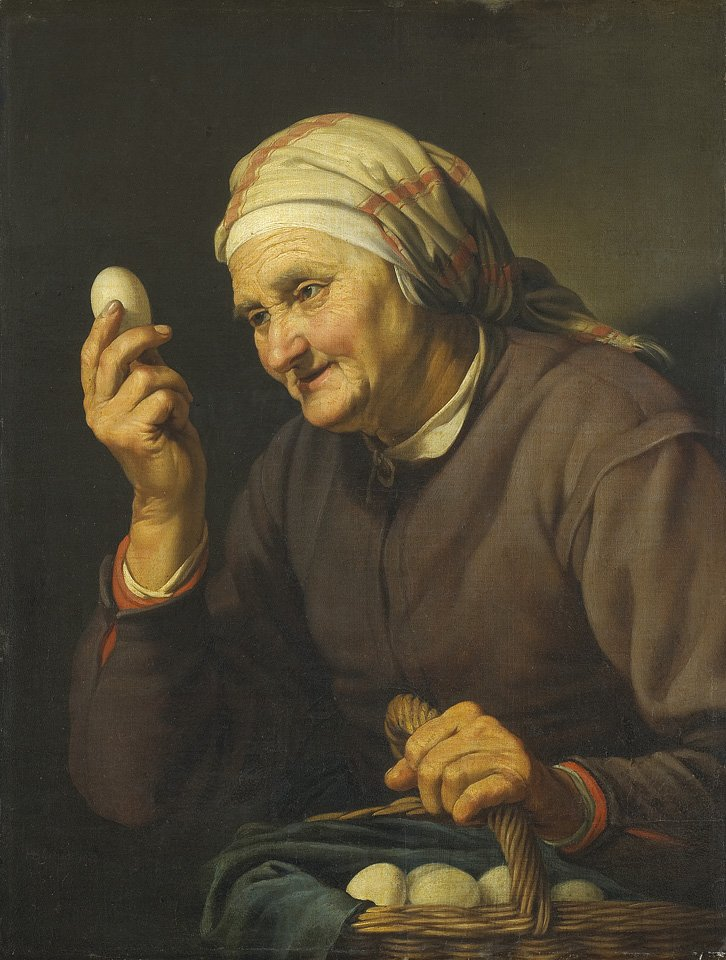
- Old woman selling eggs, 1632
- Born: Hendrick Abrahamsz; 1601; Utrecht (city)
- Died: 30 December 1672 (aged 71); Utrecht (city)
- Known for: Painting
- Movement: Baroque

Hendrick Bloemaert (1601 or 1602 – 30 December 1672) was a Dutch Golden Age painter.

== Biography ==
Hendrick was the oldest son of Abraham Bloemaert. His brothers Cornelis and Adriaen were also painters. In 1626 he was registered in Rome, but by 1631 he was back in Utrecht, where he registered in the Utrecht Guild of St. Luke and married Margaretha van der Eem, the daughter of a lawyer.

== Works ==
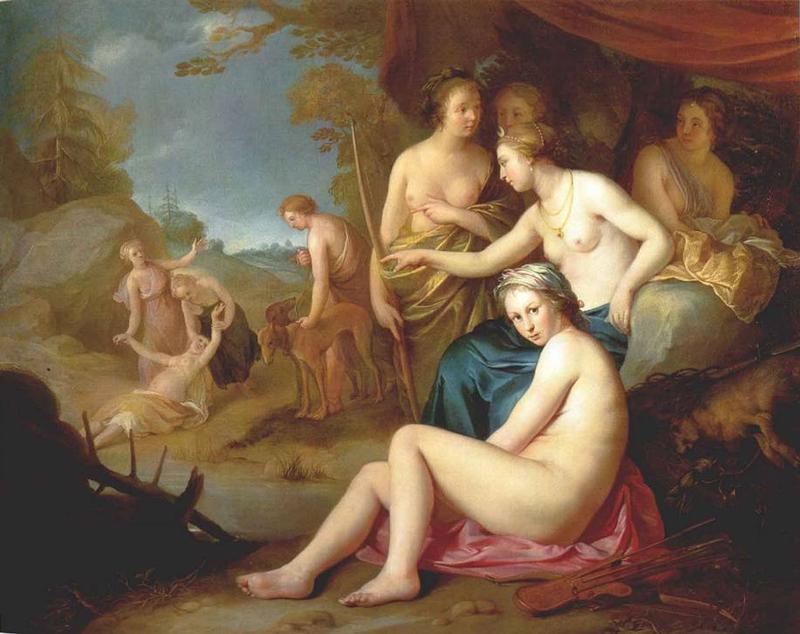
Diana en Callisto.

According to Houbraken, he never became as good as his father, but it is unclear whether Houbraken saw his work or copied this comment from Joachim von Sandrart. He is considered an important member of the Utrecht school of Caravaggisti, and was known for his portraits and historical allegories. He was also known for his poetry.
