= Frederik Bloemaert =

Dutch printmaker and draftsman (c. 1614–1690)

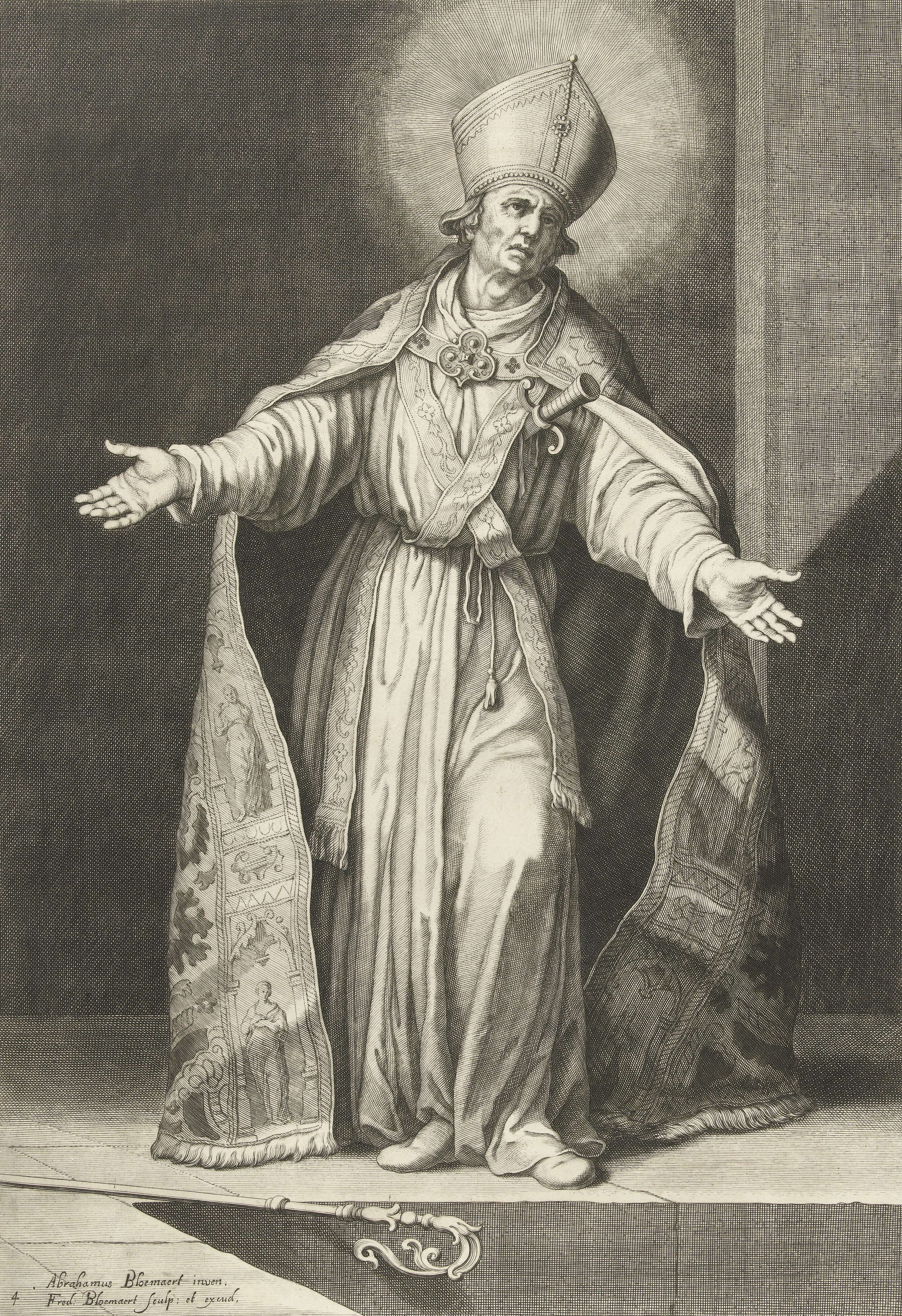
Frederick of Utrecht, engraving from c. 1630

Frederik Bloemaert (c. 1614 – 11 June 1690) was a Dutch printmaker and draftsman.

Bloemart was born and died in Utrecht. He was the youngest son of Abraham Bloemaert and distinguished himself as an engraver. He learned the art from his father, and was chiefly occupied in engraving after his designs. His principal work was a drawing book, containing 173 plates, engraved from the designs of his father. He also executed a few plates entirely with the graver. His prints are sometimes signed A. Bloem. inv. F. B. filius fecit, and sometimes F. B. The following are principally after his father's designs:

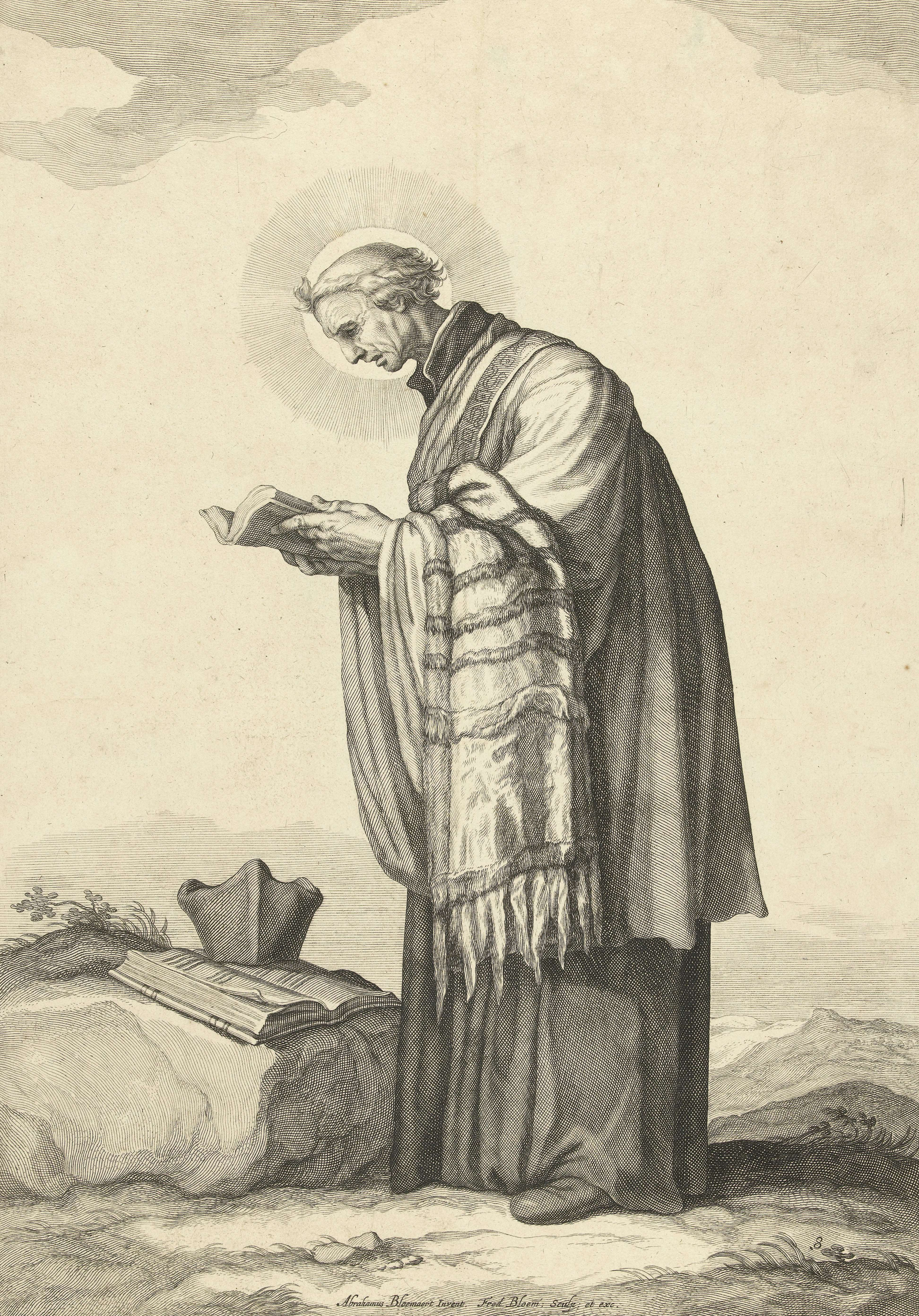
Saint Odulphus, engraving from c. 1630 after a painting by Abraham Bloemaert.

- Twelve of the Archbishops and Bishops of Utrecht, two of which are by Corn. Bloemart. (one pictured)
- Thomas a Kempis.
- St. Francis in a Hermitage.
- The Body of Leander on the sea-shore.
- A set of sixteen figures of Men and Women; marked F. B. fec.
- A set of thirty, of Beggars; on the title is inscribed Nudus inops mutilus, F. B. fec.
- The Five Senses.
- The Four Seasons.
- Twenty Landscapes; F. B. filius fecit et exc.
- A Landscape, with a Pigeon-house.
- Fourteen of Animals and Birds; entitled Verscheyde Besten und Vogelen.
- Four of Cock-fighting; De Hanabijters.
