= Nicolaes Lauwers =

Flemish engraver (1600–1652)

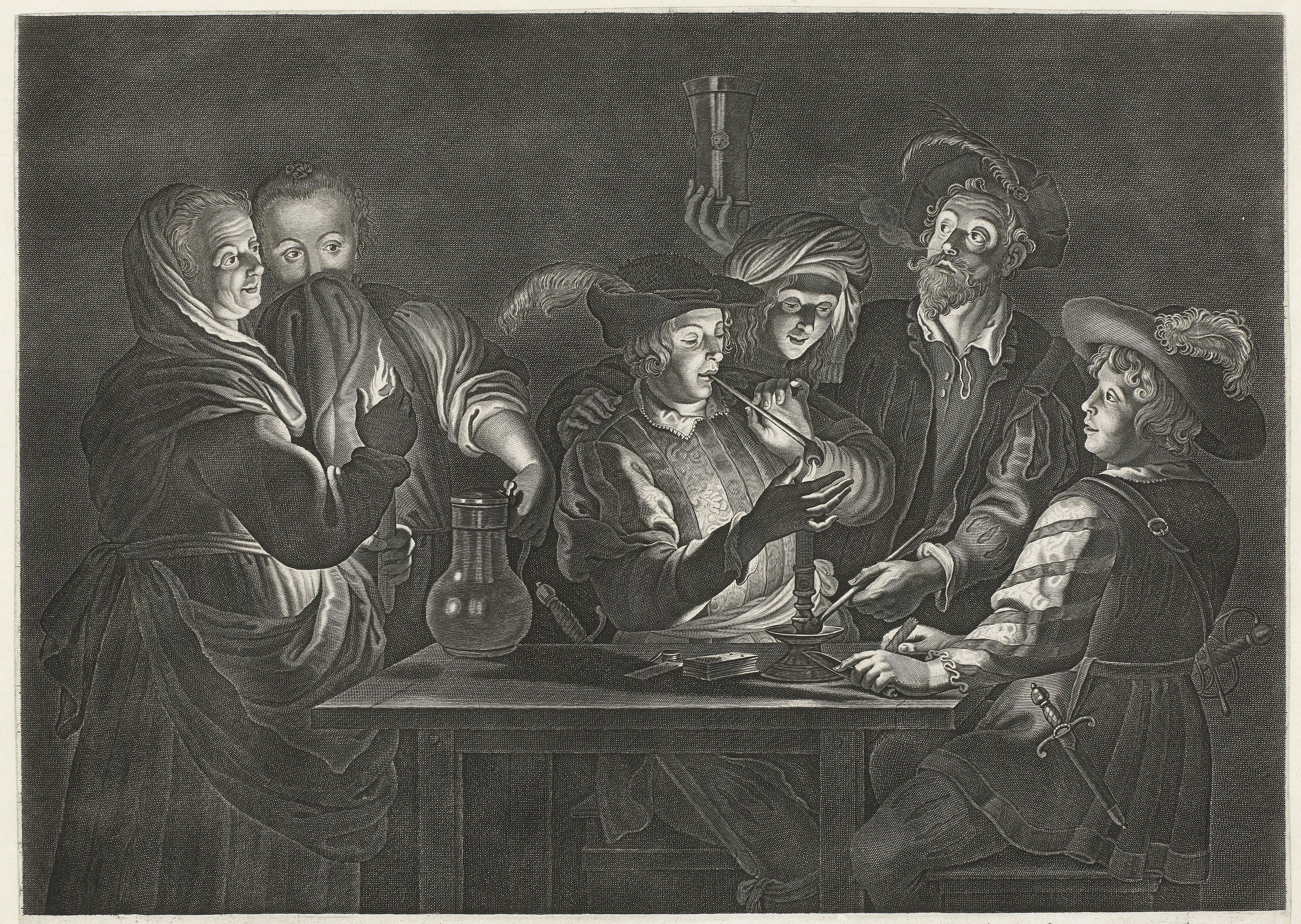
Smoking and drinking men at an inn, engraved by Lauwers after Gerard Seghers

Nicolaes Lauwers or Nicolaas Lauwers (1600, Antwerp – 1652, Antwerp), was a Flemish engraver, draughtsman, publisher, printer and art dealer. He is known for his reproductive prints after works by leading Flemish artists such as Rubens, Jacob Jordaens and Gerard Seghers.

== Life ==
He was born in Antwerp on 27 April 1600 as the son of Jacob Lauwers and Margareta Huysraet. He joined the Antwerp Guild of St. Luke in 1619, and opened a print workshop shortly after that on the Lombardenvest, called In de scryvende Hand (In the writing hand). He married on 8 February 1628 Maria Vermeulen. Their son Coenraed also became an engraver. Nicolaes was elected a deacon of the Antwerp guild in 1635.

He was buried in Antwerp on 4 November 1652.

His pupils included Nicolaes Pitau, Hendrick Snyers, Gilles de la Forgie, Marinus Vigilet, Matheus Wtenbrouck and J. B. Vervoort in addition to his son Coenraed.

== Work ==
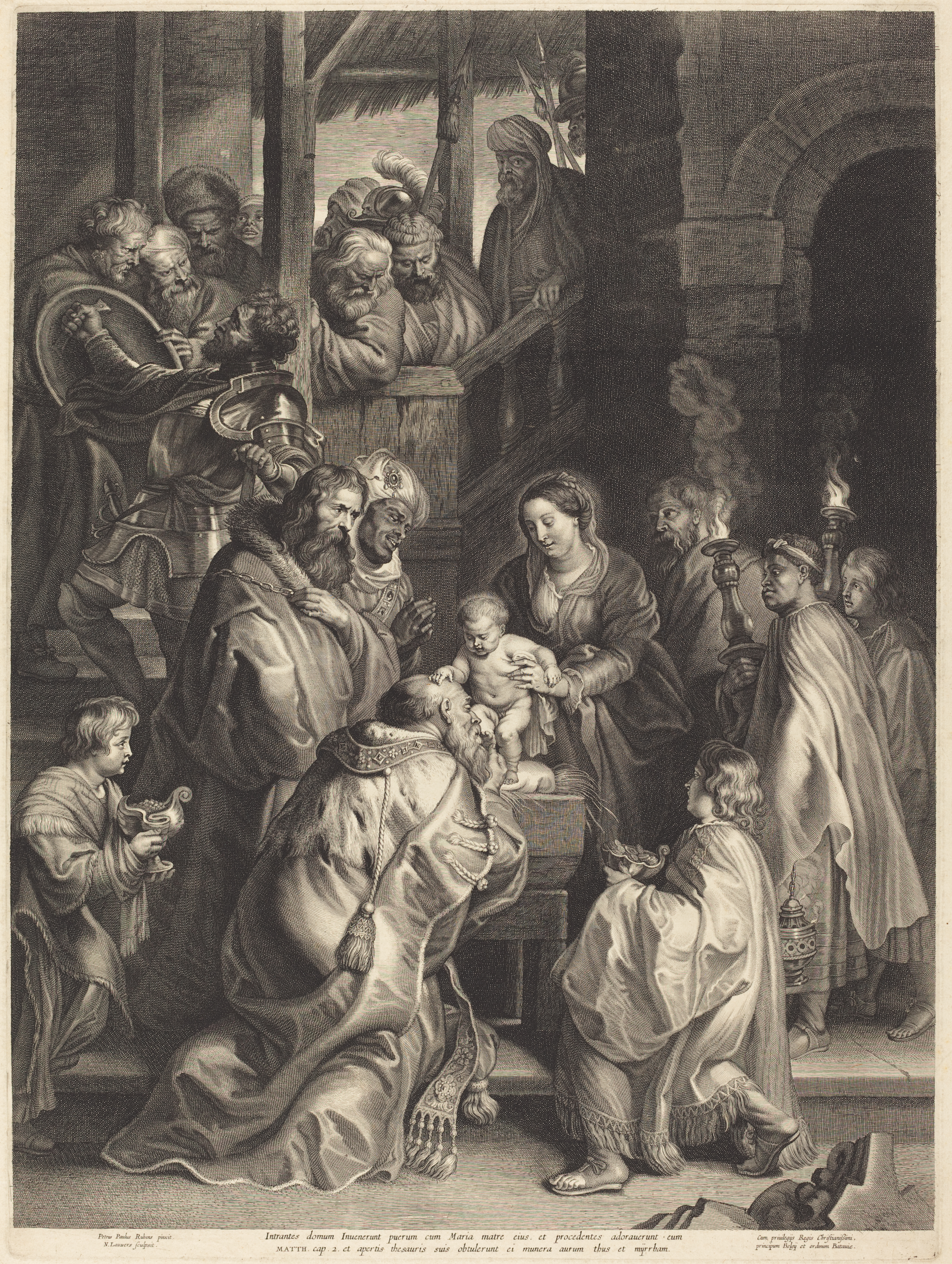
The Adoration of the Magi with Torches, engraved by Lauwers after Rubens

He is known for engraving and publishing prints after Rubens, Jacob Jordaens and other prominent Flemish painters of the century.

== Engravings ==
- Jupiter and Mercury with Philemon and Baucis after Jacob Jordaens.
- The Triumph of the Holy Sacrament after Rubens.
- The Adoration of the Magi with Torches after Rubens.
- Jesus Christ before Pilate after Rubens.
- The descent from the Cross after Rubens.
- The concert of Saint Cecilia after Gerard Seghers.
