= Matthijs Pool =

Dutch engraver (1676–1740)

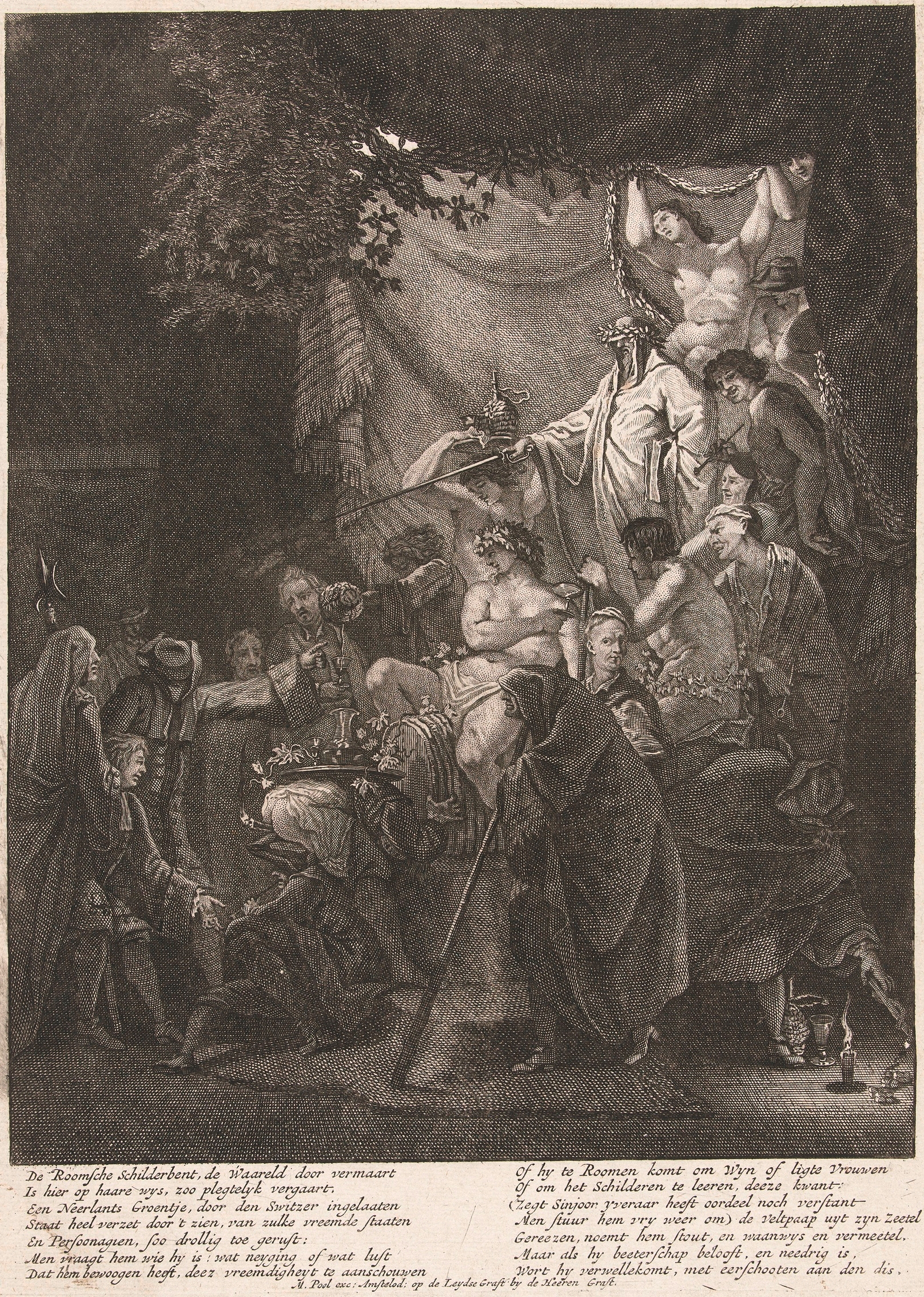
Initiation ceremony of a Bentvueghel, by Domenicus van Wijnen, ca. 1700, engraved by Matthijs Pool with a rhyme at the bottom about the initiation.

Matthijs Pool (1676–1740) was an engraver from the Dutch Republic.

== Biography ==
Pool was born and died in Amsterdam. According to the RKD he worked with Gerard de Lairesse making engravings for his Groot schilderboeck, and worked with the painter Barend Graat on publication of engravings after ivory sculptures by Francis van Bossuit after the classics. In 1708 he married Barend Graat's daughter and his address then changed to the Leidsegracht. He is known for engravings after other artists and topographical prints. He is also known for depictions of the Bentvueghels that he engraved after paintings by Domenicus van Wijnen, otherwise known as Askaan.
