= Bartholomeus Breenbergh =

Dutch painter (1598–1657)

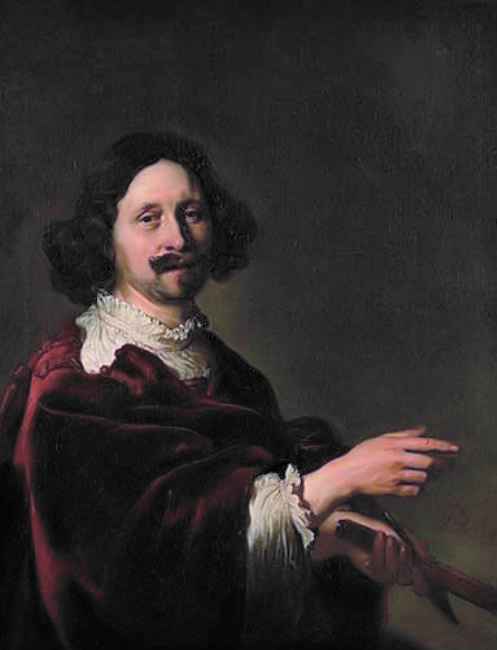
- Bartholomeus Breenbergh (1599-1659), by Jacob Adriaensz Backer, 1644
- Born: November 3, 1598
- Died: October 3, 1657 (aged 58)
- Style: Landscapes
- Movement: Dutch Golden Age

Bartholomeus Breenbergh (before 13 November 1598 – after 3 October 1657) was a Dutch Golden Age painter of Italian and Italianate landscapes, in Rome (1619-1630) and Amsterdam (1630-1657).

== Biography ==
Little is known of his early life. In his three-volume Schouburg, Arnold Houbraken mentioned him in his first volume with an entreaty to readers to write to him with more news of Breenbergh's biography. He had been told that Breenberg was born in Utrecht and had been a master of Cornelis van Poelenburgh, which he knew to be impossible from the facts that he already had, namely "the birth of Poelenburg in 1586 and the death of Breenberg in 1660." Houbraken never received the information he requested, though he mentioned Breenbergh again in his second volume in a list of 59 competent painters who were contemporaries of Abraham Bloemaert and Paulus Potter.

According to the Netherlands Institute for Art History (RKD), Breenbergh was born in the Netherlands town of Deventer, but after the death of his father in 1607 moved away with the rest of his family, probably to Hoorn. There he was a contemporary of Jacques Waben and possibly received his first training, though his first teacher is now supposed to be "one of those many forgotten Amsterdam landscape painters of the 1610s". His registered teachers are Pieter Lastman and Jacob Symonsz Pynas.

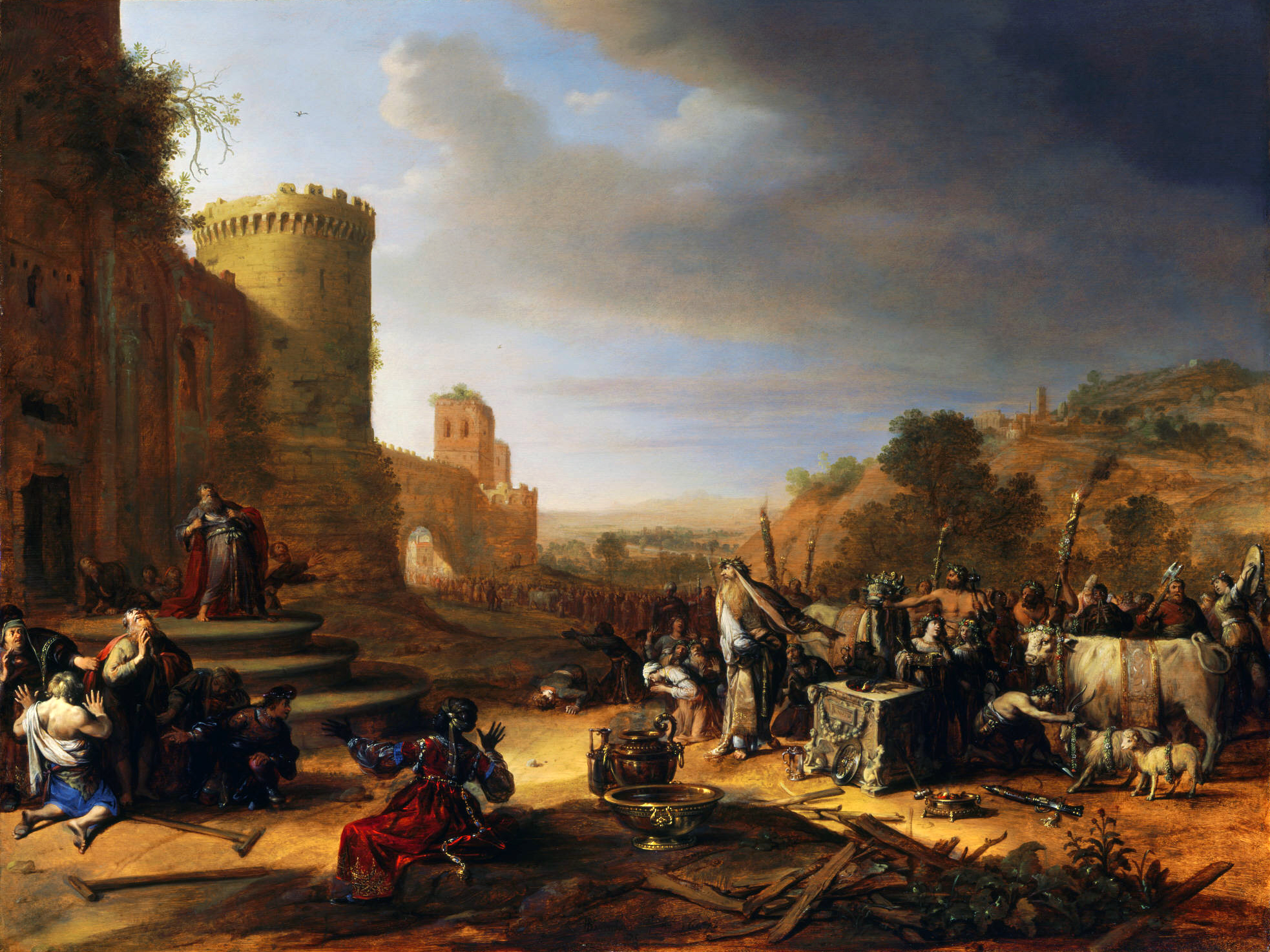
Bartholomeus Breenberg, Saints Paul and Barnabas at Lystra (Sacrifice at Lystra), 1637, Princeton University Art Museum

Breenbergh is first registered as a painter on an archival record in 1619 in Amsterdam, though he possibly was established there earlier.

In the same year he left for Rome. There he lived and worked with the Flemish painter Frans van de Kasteele and was heavily influenced by another Fleming resident, the landscape painter Paul Bril. From 1623, however, he came under the spell of Italian landscapes by the somewhat older Cornelis van Poelenburgh—indeed, the works of Breenbergh and van Poelenburgh are sometimes difficult to tell apart. He was also influenced by Nicolaes Moeyaert. Breenbergh in his turn influenced the French landscape-painter Claude Lorrain (who arrived in the city about 1620). In about 1620 Breenbergh became one of the founders of the Roman society of Dutch and Flemish painters, the Bentvueghels, among whom he was nicknamed "het fret" (the ferret).

In 1630 Breenbergh returned to Amsterdam. In 1633 he married, and received a yearly wage of 60 pounds from the court of king Charles I of Britain. He remained in Amsterdam until his death, where he made popular paintings and etchings of Italian buildings. There he was influenced by the pre-Rembrandtists such as Pieter Lastman and Nicolaes Moeyaert, but he placed their Biblical and mythological scenes in Italian landscapes.

His only registered pupil is Jan de Bisschop, who was his pupil in the 1640s until 1648. He influenced the painters Jan Linsen, Scipione Compagno, Laurens Barata, Charles Cornelisz. de Hooch, Pieter Anthonisz. van Groenewegen, Francois van Knibbergen, and Catharina van Knibbergen.
