= Jean Baptiste Assenede =

Jean Baptiste Assenede (also Jan Baptist Assenede, Jean Baptiste Assenie, Jean Baptiste Asseny and nickname Lantaren was a Flemish painter from the Baroque who was active in Italy in the middle of the 17th century. He was born in Tournai in the first half of 17th century. He is recorded in Rome from 1646 to 1655. Here he became a member of the Bentvueghels, an association of mainly Dutch and Flemish artists active in Rome. His nickname (the so-called 'bent-name') was 'Lantaren', which is Dutch for 'Lantern'. No existing work of his hand is known today.
