= Simon Ardé =

Simon Ardé (also Simon Ardi, Symon van Antwerpen and nickname Tovenaer) (Deventer, ca. 1596 – Rome, 1638) was a Flemish Baroque painter who was active in Italy for most part of his life.

== Biography ==
Orphaned at the age of seven years on the death of his mother, who was Protestant, he was brought up by Catholic uncles in Liège and Brussels, and apprenticed on 11 August 1609 to the Brussels painter Jean Bouillon. In 1614 he left Brussels for France where he lived for about five years, before moving to Rome in around 1619. On arrival there he became an early member of the Bentvueghels, which was set up as a social club of principally Dutch and Flemish artists working in Rome. The nickname he took in the Bentvueghels was 'Tovenaer', which means 'wizard'. His portrait appears on one of the anonymous drawings of members of the Bentvueghels made around 1623 and now kept in the Museum Boijmans Van Beuningen in Rotterdam. The drawing shows Simon Ardé pouring liquor into the glasses of the other members of the Bentvueghels Jean Ducamps, Pieter Anthonisz. van Groenewegen and Joost Lampen (or Campen). Underneath his portrait is written ‘Sijmon van Antwerpen Alias Den Tooveaner’, which translates as 'Simon from Antwerp, aka the Wizard'.

In 1623 Ardé became painter to Cardinal Trejo (Gabriel Trejo y Paniagua), living in the cardinal's palace. There an event occurred in 1626 which led Ardé to come before the Inquisition. In his own words, "Standing at the window of a room which I have above the ordinary rooms of the Cardinal, and hearing a noise in the street, I saw three or four Christian men maltreating some Jews ... and one of them sought safety in the palace. I was joined in the room where I was standing and at the window by an assistant of the cardinal called Giovanni Well, an unbearded youth 19 or 20 years old. Out of the compassion I had for those Jews I said that they were wrong to treat in that way those Jews who had been placed in this world by God. He replied to me that they were animals who ought to be killed, because they were on their way to the house of the Devil. I replied "How come they are 'on their way to the house of the Devil'? Do you know the will of God? They were here before us, and they have received the Law of God from Moses. [And I added] that God was merciful, that they could not only save themselves by observing his Law, if they lived righteously, if they did not kill, if they did not steal, nor doing any other bad thing ...". Another of the Cardinal's assistants then told Ardé that he ought not to have said those words, because there was no salvation outside the Catholic church. To avoid scandal for Cardinal Trejo, who was a member of the Inquisition, Ardé voluntarily submitted himself to be interrogated by inquisitors, On being asked about his beliefs, he said "I believed that, as God was merciful, each person can save themselves within their own law, for example the Christians with their law, the Jews with theirs, and all the others with their own, even the Lutherans", adding that some of his own relatives were Lutherans. Finally he offered to take instruction from the Catholic church in respect of any errors. Ardé must have been acquitted as he continued to work for Cardinal Trejo until the cardinal left Rome in 1629.

In Rome Ardé was a close associate of two other artists from Brussels, the sculptor François Duquesnoy and the painter Karel Philips Spierincks, both of whom Ardé appointed as his heirs. He remained in Rome until his death on 22 August 1638.

No paintings or drawings by him are known to have survived.
