= Pieter de Zeelander =

Dutch painter

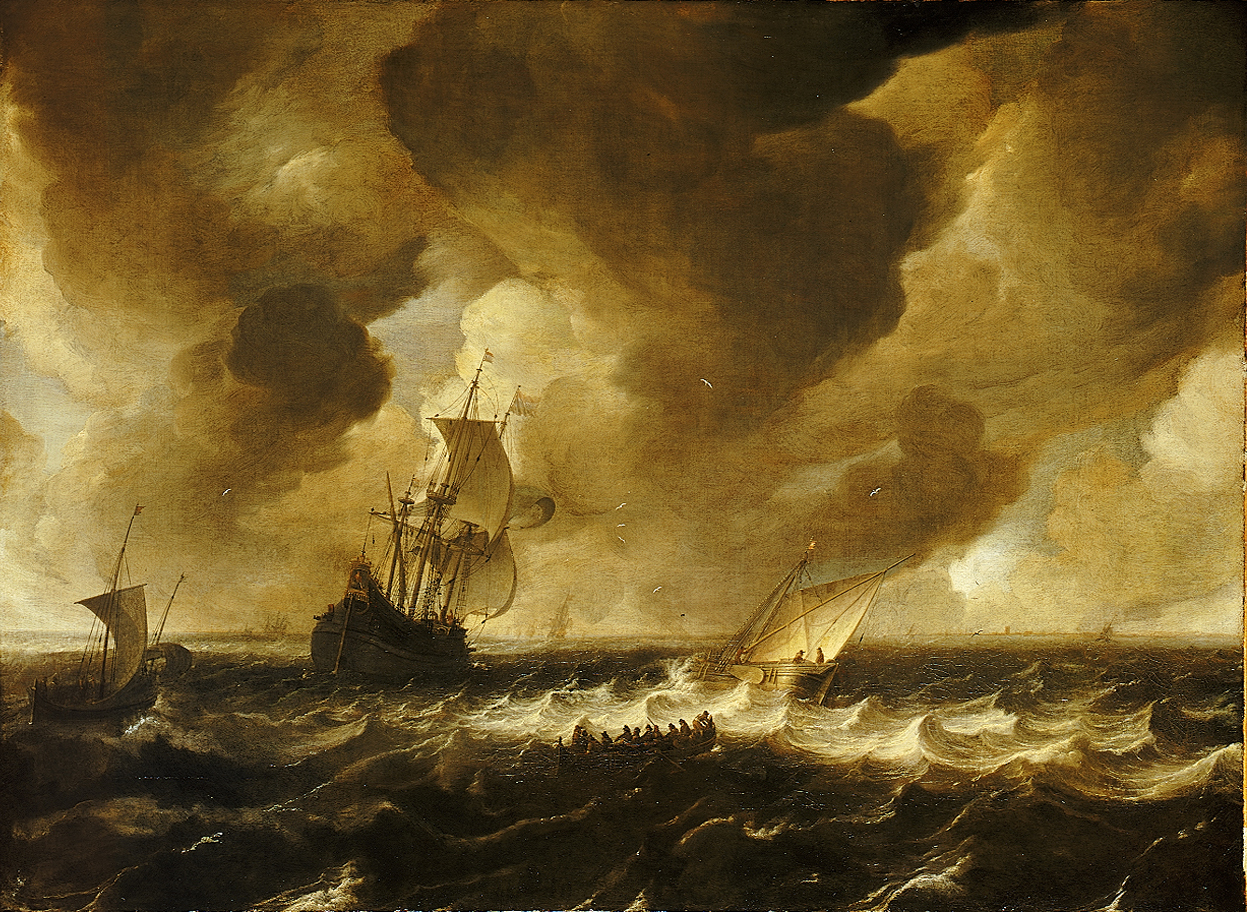
A flute and other vessels off the Dutch coast

Pieter de Zeelander (nickname Kaper) (c. 1620 in Haarlem – after 1650 in Rome) was a Dutch painter who specialized in seascapes.

== Biography ==
Nothing is known about his training. He traveled to Rome in 1648. He was a member of the Bentvueghels, an association of mainly Dutch and Flemish artists working in Rome. He was given the nickname (called ‘bent name’) 'Kaper', which means privateer. There is no further information known about him and it is believed that he died in Rome.
