= Cornelis de Bruijn =

Dutch artist and traveler

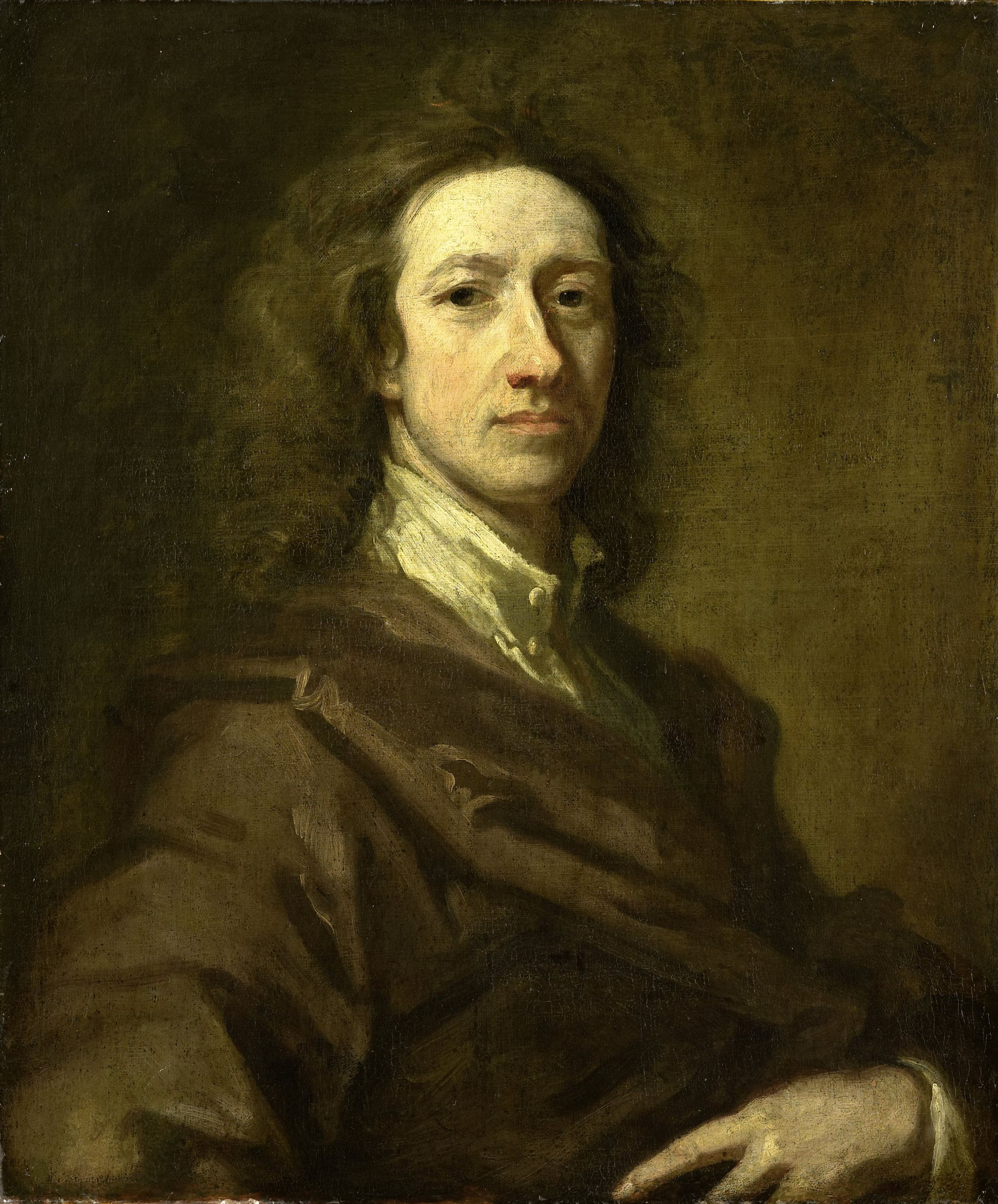
- Portrait of Cornelis de Bruijn by Godfrey Kneller (c. 1698)
- Born: 1652; The Hague
- Died: 1727 (aged 74–75)
- Occupation: Painter, traveler
- Awards: Prijs voor Meesterschap (1984)

Cornelis de Bruijn or Cornelius de Bruyn (pronounced [də ˈbrœyn]; 1652 – 1726/7), also formerly known in English by his French name Corneille Le Brun, was a Dutch artist and traveler. He made two large tours and published illustrated books with his observations of people, buildings, plants and animals.

== Biography ==
De Bruijn was born in The Hague, the Netherlands.

During his first tour, he visited Rome, where he became a member of the Bentvueghels with the nickname Adonis, which is how he signed the bentbrief of Abraham Genoels II. He travelled in Egypt and climbed to the top of a pyramid where he left his signature. De Bruijn made secret drawings of Jerusalem, then part of the Ottoman Empire. His drawings of Palmyra are copies. De Bruijn reached Cyprus and stayed among the Dutch merchants in Smyrna and Constantinople. From 1684 he worked in Venice with the painter Johann Carl Loth, returning in 1693 to The Hague, where he sold his souvenirs. In 1698 he published his book with drawings, which was a success and was translated in several languages. Two examples have colored illustrations, the first colour prints in history. Among his drawings were the first pictures of the interior of the Great Pyramid and Jerusalem that became known in Europe.

In 1701 he headed for Arkhangelsk. During his second tour he visited the Samoyeds in northern Russia. In Moscow he became acquainted with emperor Peter the Great: de Bruijn painted his nieces, and the paintings were sent to possible candidates for marriage.

In late April 1703, De Bruijn left Moscow along with the party of an Armenian merchants from Isfahan whose name he recorded as Jacob Daviedof. De Bruijn and the Armenians sailed down the Moscow River, the Oka and the Volga, eventually reaching Astrakhan. Thanks to de Bruijn's short stopover in Nizhny Novgorod during the Easter holidays, we now have his description of that major centre of the Russian Volga trade as it existed in 1703, with its Kremlin, stone churches, and a lively bar (kabak) scene.

Leaving the borders of the Russian state, de Bruijn arrived to Persia, where he made drawings of towns like Isfahan and Persepolis (1704–1705). He continued to Java and returned to Persia, Russia, and ultimately the Netherlands.

His drawings of Persepolis, a city destroyed by Alexander the Great, caused a sensation. The mayor of Amsterdam Nicolaes Witsen and a member of the Royal Society probably asked him to draw the city famous for its 40 columns. For a century, they were the best prints available to western scholars. De Bruijn was accused of plagiarism and his second book, Reizen over Moskovie was not such a success. From Amsterdam he fled to Vianen. De Bruijn was invited by a Mennonite silk merchant and died in Utrecht. It is not known when and where he was buried.

De Bruijn, who had read every Greek and Latin source he had been able to obtain, displays a convincing knowledge of subjects, at times going into the humorous. In Persia, he obtained a copy of Firdausi's Shahnamê, which he summarized and made accessible to the west.

== Works ==
- Reizen van Cornelis de Bruyn door de vermaardste Deelen van Klein Asia (1698)

- Corneille le Brun, Voyage au Levant (French translation, 1700)
- Corneille le Brun, A Voyage to the Levant: or Travels in the Principal Parts of Asia Minor (English translation, 1702)

- Reizen over Moskovie, door Persie en Indie (1711)

- Voyages de Corneille le Brun par la Moscovie, en Perse, et aux Indes Occidentales (French translation, 1718)
- Corneille le Brun, Voyage to the Levant and Travels into Moscovy, Persia, and the East Indies (English translation, 1720)
- C. le Brun, An Abstract of M.C. Le Brun's Travels through Russia (1722)
- Puteshestvie cerez Moskouviju Kornelija de Brujna (Russian excerpt 1873)

- Aenmerkingen Over de Printverbeeldingen van de Overblijfzelen van het Oude Persepolis (1714)

Other English translations appeared in 1737, 1759, and 1873.

=== Sketches ===
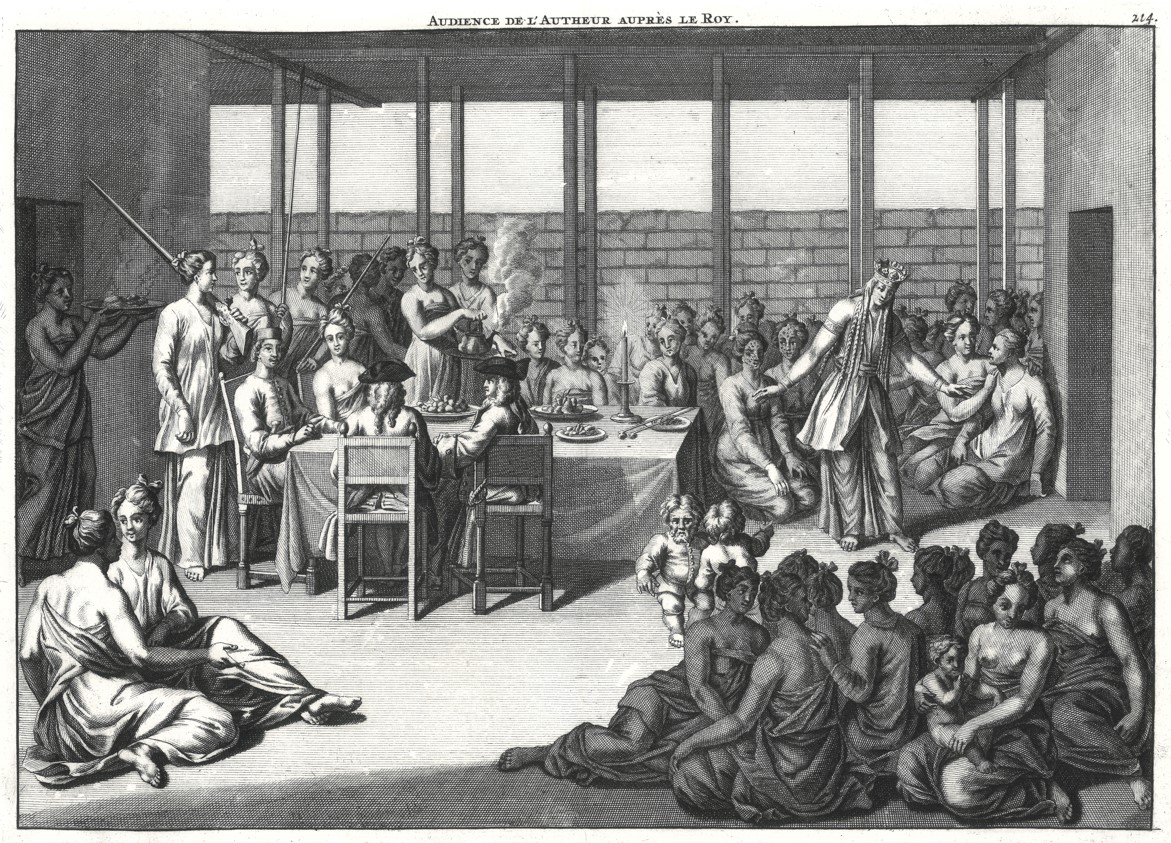
Audience with the Sultan of 'Banten' (1711)

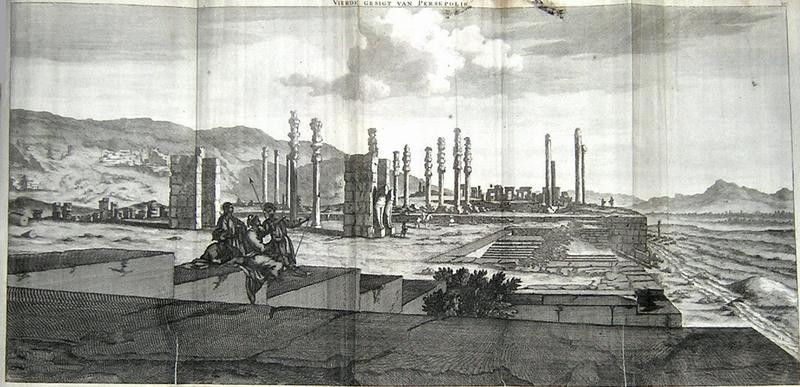
Sketch of Persepolis (1704)

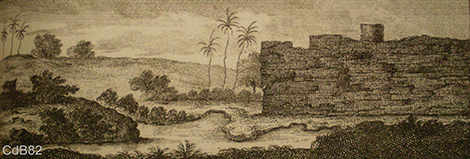
Place where the pharaoh's daughter saved Moses from the Nile river, 1698 sketch made by Dutch traveller Cornelis de Bruijn on his journey through Egypt. The local inhabitants pointed out this spot.

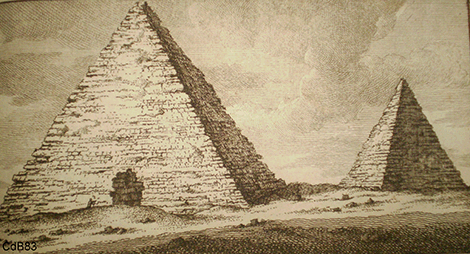
Giza Plateau

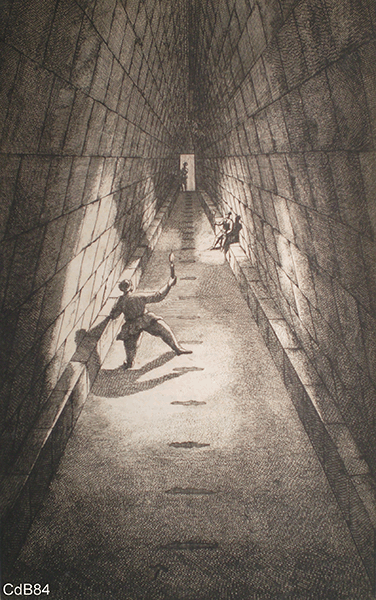
Great Pyramid grand gallery

== Sources ==
- J.W. Drijvers, J. de Hond, H. Sancisi-Weerdenburg (eds.): "Ik hadde de nieusgierigheid". De reizen door het Nabije Oosten van Cornelis de Bruijn (ca.1652–1727) (1997 Leiden and Leuven)
- J. de Hond, "Cornelis de Bruijn (1652-1726/27). A Dutch Painter in the East", in: G.J. van Gelder, E. de Moor (eds.), Eastward Bound. Dutch Ventures and Adventures in the Middle East (1994 London/Atlanta), pp. 51–81
- G. Jurriaans-Helle (ed.), Cornelis de Bruijn. Voyages from Rome to Jerusalem and from Moscow to Batavia (Catalogue of an exposition in the Allard Pierson Museum, Amsterdam, 1998)
- Bruin, Cornelis de (1725), Voyage au Levant: c'est-à-dire, dans les principaux endroits de l'Asie Mineure, dans les isles de Chio, Rhodes, Chypre, etc., de même que dans les plus considérables villes d'Egypte, de Syrie, et Terre Sainte., vol. 3, J.-B.-C. Bauche le fils
