= Tyman Arentsz. Cracht =

Dutch painter

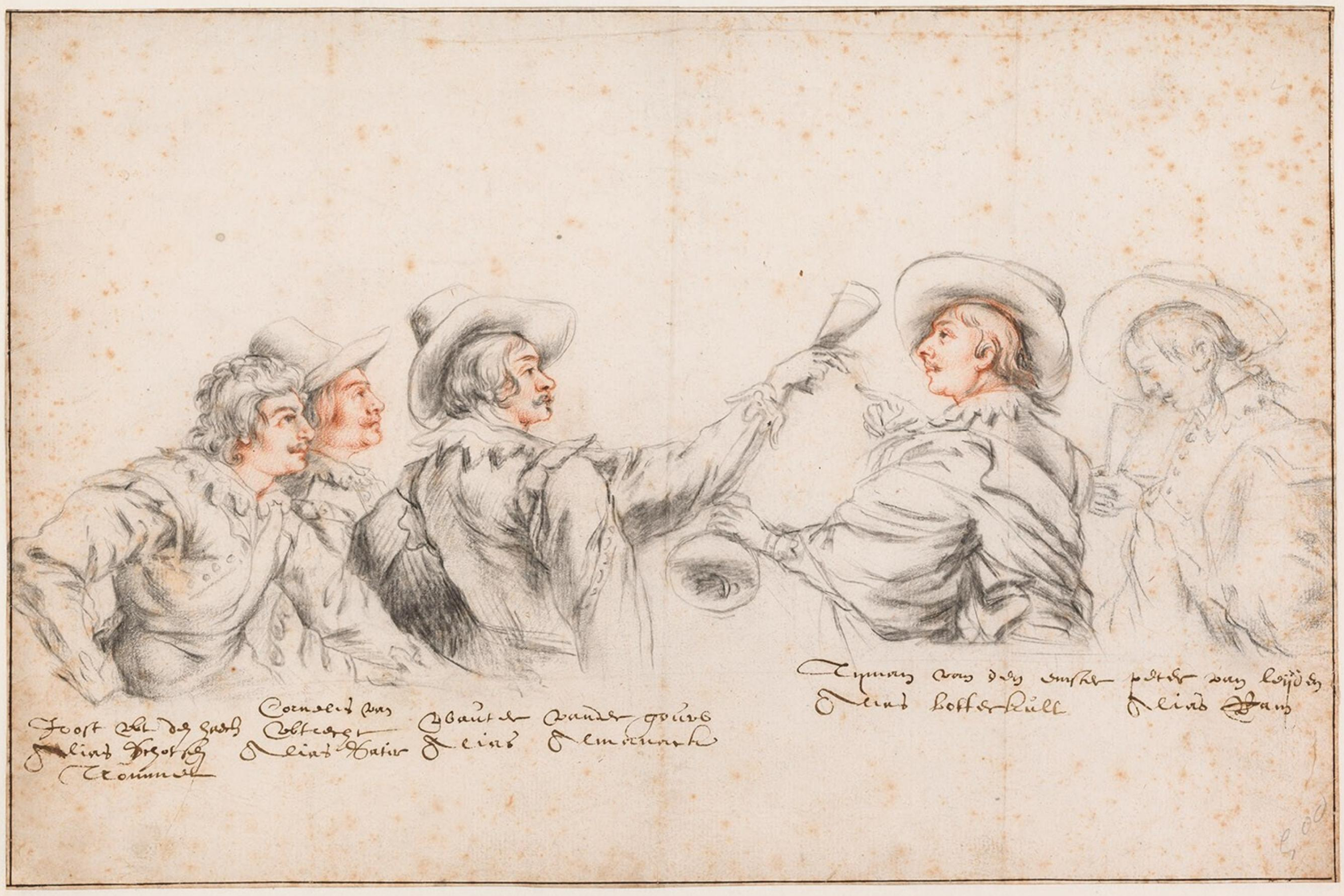
Anonymous drawing in the Museum Boijmans Van Beuningen, Rotterdam. From left to right: Joost from The Hague (bent name Schotsen trommel), Cornelis (Poelenburgh) from Utrecht (bent name Satier), Wouter (Crabeth) from Gou (bent name Almanack), Tyman (Cracht) from Emster (bent name 'Botterkull') and Peter from Leiden (bent name Ram).

Tyman Arentsz Cracht (Note: Family name variations are Craft, Gracht, Crocht, van den Emster, and Kraft. First name variations are Ditmaro, Timaro, Timon, Thyman, and Tijman.) alias Botterkul (between 1590 and 1600 – 1646) was a Dutch painter who specialized in landscapes and history paintings.

== Life ==
He was born in Wormer. Nothing is known about his training. He traveled to Rome in 1620 or 1621. He was one of the founding members of the Bentvueghels, an association of mainly Dutch and Flemish artists working in Rome. It was customary for the Bentvueghels to adopt an appealing nickname, the so-called 'bent name'. Cracht was given the bent name 'Botterkull' or 'Botterkul', which may be a reference to the Dutch sweet called 'Boterbal' (butter or cream ball).

His portrait appears on one of the sheets with portraits of Bentvueghels, which are now in the Museum Boijmans Van Beuningen in Rotterdam. Cracht is depicted with the following members of the Bentveughels: Joost from The Hague, Cornelis van Poelenburch, Wouter Crabeth II and Peter from Leiden. Cracht himself is referred to in the sheets as 'Tyman (Cracht) van den Emster alias Botterkull'. The expression 'van den Emster' indicates a person from the Dutch province of Drenthe. This is difficult to square with Cracht having been born in Wormer, in the province of North Holland. Cracht did have a brother-in-law who lived in Wormer. Cracht was a close friend of David de Haen, another member of the Bentvueghels.

In 1626 Cracht joined the fraternity of the Collegio Teutonico. Along with the painter Cornelis Schut he worked from 13 January 1627 for Giorgio Pescatori (aka Pieter de Vischere), an Italian banker and patron of Flemish origin and painted frescoes in his villa in Frascati, the so-called 'Casino Pescatore’.

Cracht was in Rome until 1631, the year in which he traveled to The Hague, where he became a member of the local Guild of Saint Luke. He was head ('Hoofdman') of the Guild from 1634 to 1636 and in 1640. In 1636, Abraham van Beijeren was Cracht's pupil in The Hague. Cracht worked in 1638 at Huis Honselaarsdijk for stadtholder Frederick Henry, Prince of Orange. In 1642, he was enrolled as a member of the militia ('Schutterij') of the Hague. On 9 May 1646, his estate was auctioned off in The Hague.

== Work ==
Cracht was known for his landscapes and history paintings but he also painted portraits. He was influenced by Caravaggio.
