= Catharina van Knibbergen =

Dutch Golden Age landscape painter

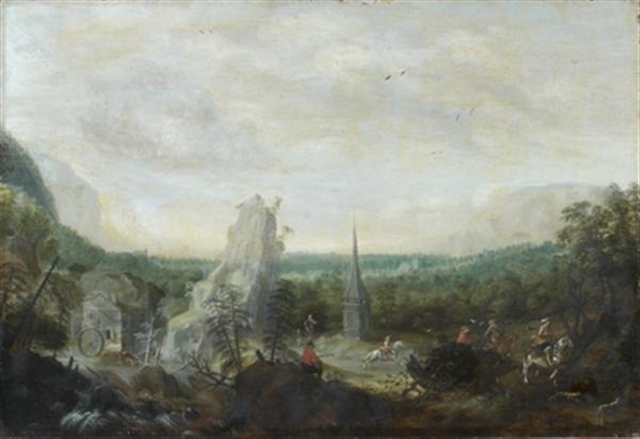
Soldiers in a landscape

Catharina Knibbergen was a Dutch Golden Age landscape painter.

== Biography ==
According to the RKD she was influenced by Bartholomeus Breenbergh and was perhaps the daughter of the painter François van Knibbergen (born 1596/97). However, in a 1634 poem Pieter Nootmans already called her the vermaarde kunstrijke schilderes ("famous artful painter") Juffrouw Catharina van Knibbergen, suggesting a birth in the 1610s at the latest. The painter who married the wine merchant Lucas de Hen in 1643 in The Hague was not Catharina Knibbergen, as the RKD suggests, but Catharina van der Snap.

In 1660 she was a member of Confrerie Pictura and various landscapes signed by her have turned up in period inventories in The Hague.
