= Barend Graat =

Dutch painter

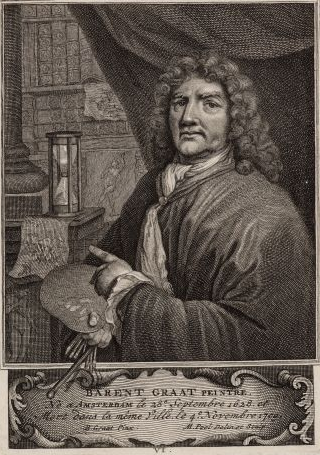
Posthumous engraving by Matthijs Pool after a self-portrait.

Barend Graat (21 September 1628, Amsterdam – 4 November 1709, Amsterdam), was a Dutch painter of history- and altarpieces, landscapes and portraits in the Golden Age. He is also known as a printmaker and draughtsman.

== Biography ==
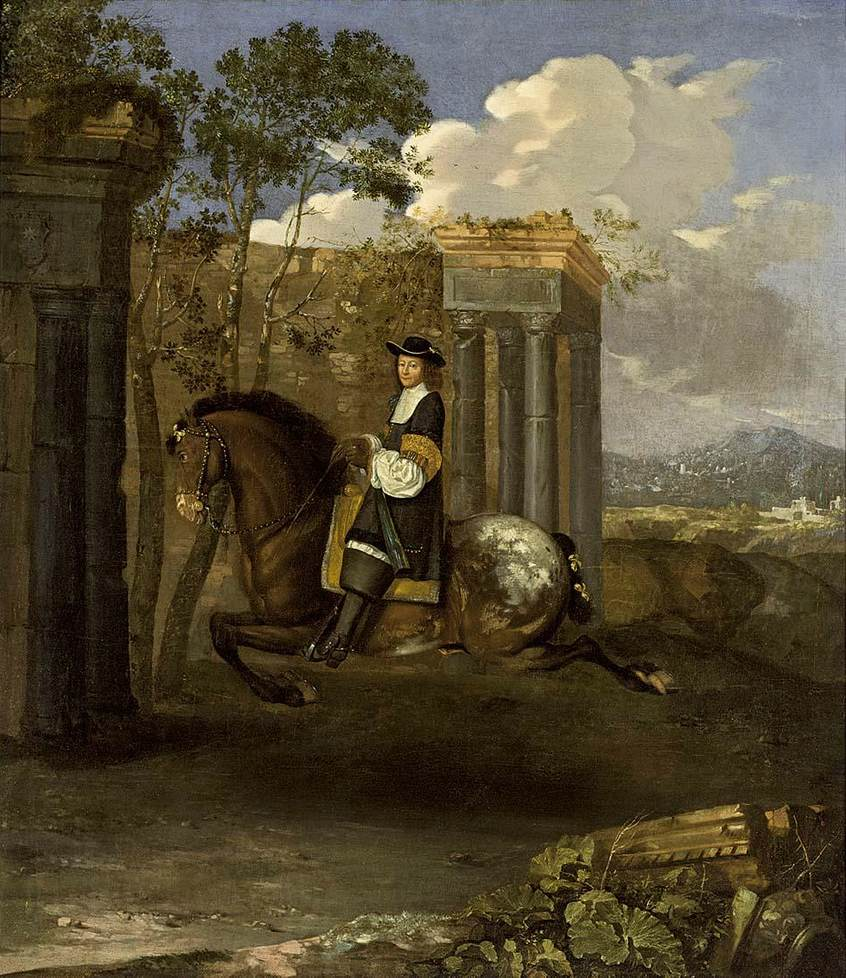
Equestrian Portrait of a Gentleman

Barend Graat was baptized in the Nieuwe Kerk (Amsterdam). According to Houbraken, who only saw his etchings, Graat learned to paint from his uncle Hans. Though he never traveled to Italy, he became proficient in making small Italianate landscapes and genre pieces in the manner of Pieter van Laer. He signed his works B. Graat fecit. Graat was known for his skill painting farm animals, and taught the painter Johann Heinrich Roos, whom he outlived.

Graat had connections with Jan Vos, a poet and playwright. In 1660 he married a young widow and decided not to travel to Italy, although he had made preparations. In 1664 he bought a plot and had a house build on Leidsegracht In 1668 and 1670 two daughters were baptized in a hidden Catholic church. In 1672 he was one of the painters evaluating a collection of paintings sold by Gerrit Uylenburgh to pronounce their authenticity. For fifteen years, the painter led an art academy at his house.

Graat lived to the great age of 81 and was active as a decorative painter, creating Grisailles and overmantel pieces for the regent families of Amsterdam, many of which survive today. His nephew Matthijs Pool who married his daughter in 1708 engraved drawings that Graat made of ivory sculptures by Francis de Bossuit and published these in 1727.

The Amsterdams Historisch Museum has an Allegory of Care painting in their collection from the former Old Men's Almshouse, based on an emblem by Cesare Ripa.

== Gallery ==
A gallery of paintings done by Barend Graat and/or depicting Barend Graat

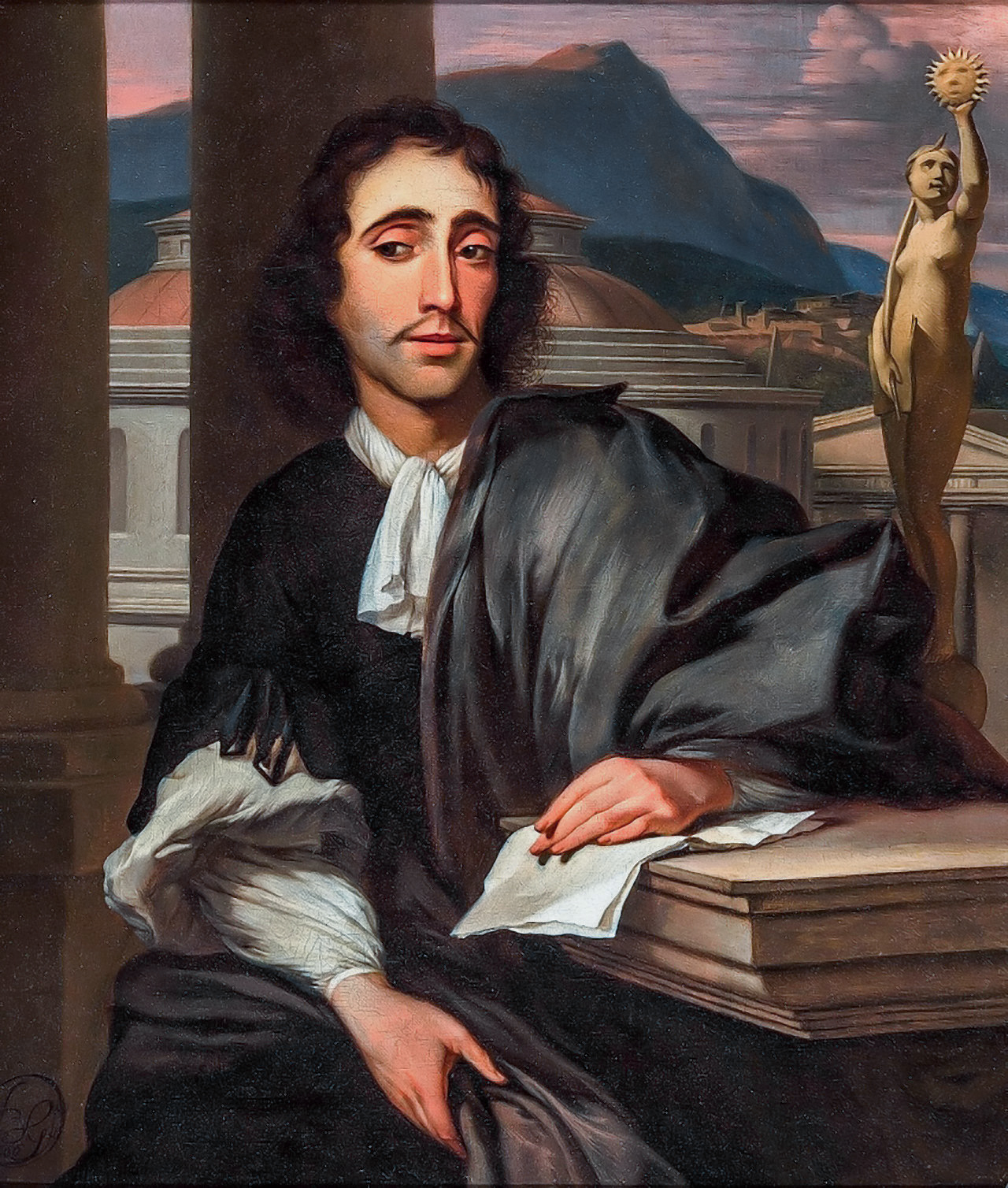
Portrait of a man, thought to be Baruch de Spinoza, attributed to Barend Graat

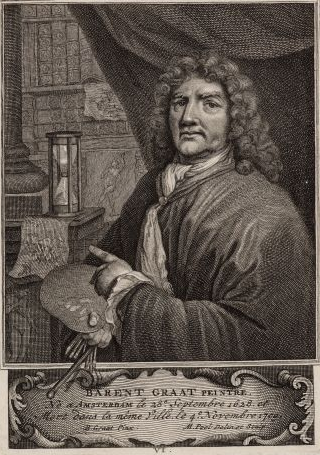
Posthumous engraving by Matthijs Pool after a self-portrait.

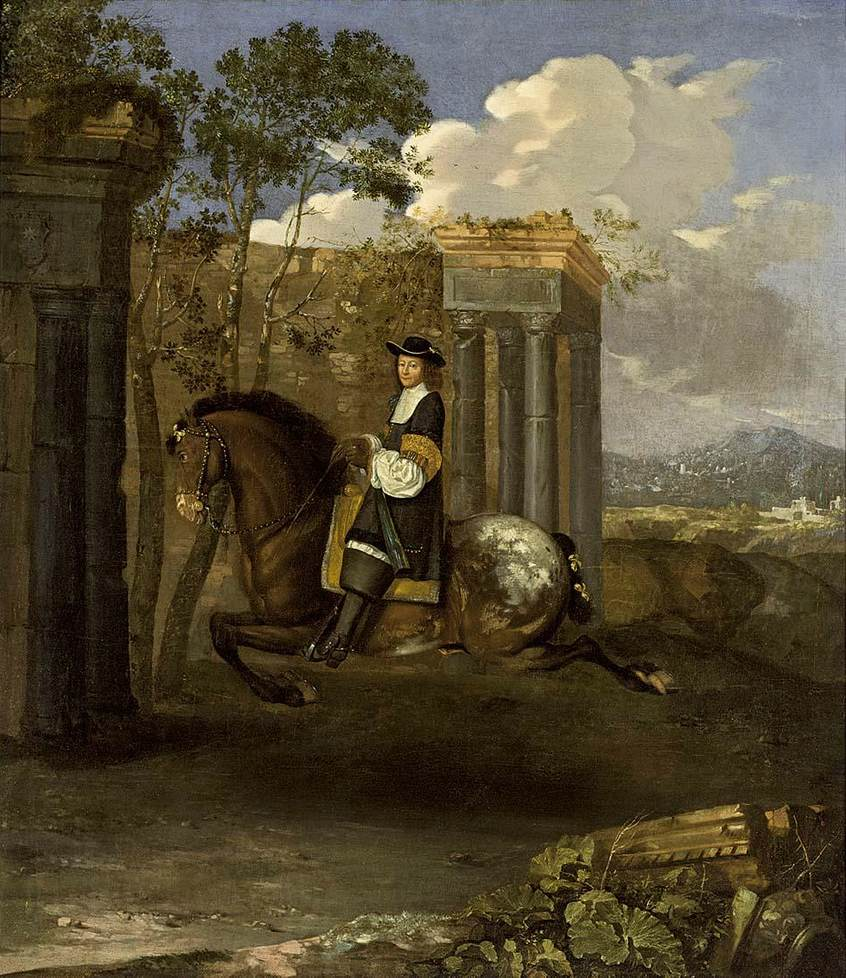
Equestrian Portrait of a Gentleman
