= Jan Linsen =

Dutch painter

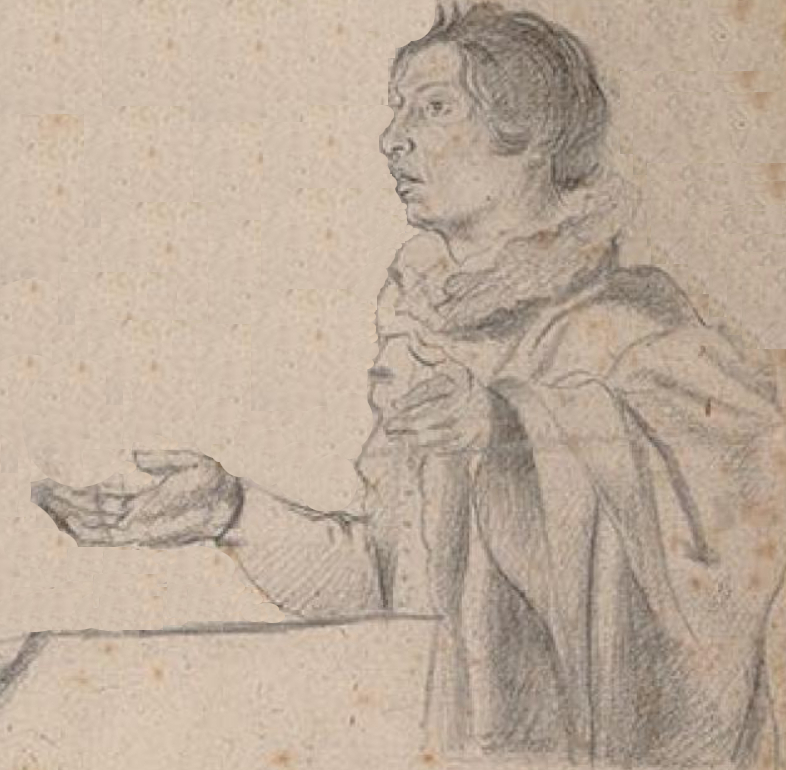
Jan Linsen in a group portrait of members of the Bentvueghels in Rome around 1623

Jan Linsen (Hoorn, 1602 or 1603 – Hoorn, 26 May 1635) was a Dutch painter of mythological and biblical themes.

== Life ==
Jan Linsen was likely born in Hoorn. He travelled in France and Italy. From 1624 to 1626 he was active in Rome and lived in the Strada dell'Olmo in the Sancti Nicolai parish in 1625. The parish archives of Sancti Nicolai datin9 to 1625 mentioned him as 22 years old 'Giovanni Lincens, olandese, pittore, d'anni 22'. In Rome he joined the Bentvueghels, an association of mainly Dutch and Flemish artists working in Rome. It was customary for the Bentvueghels to adopt an appealing nickname, the so-called 'bent name'. He was given the bent name Hermafrodito. He left Rome in 1626.

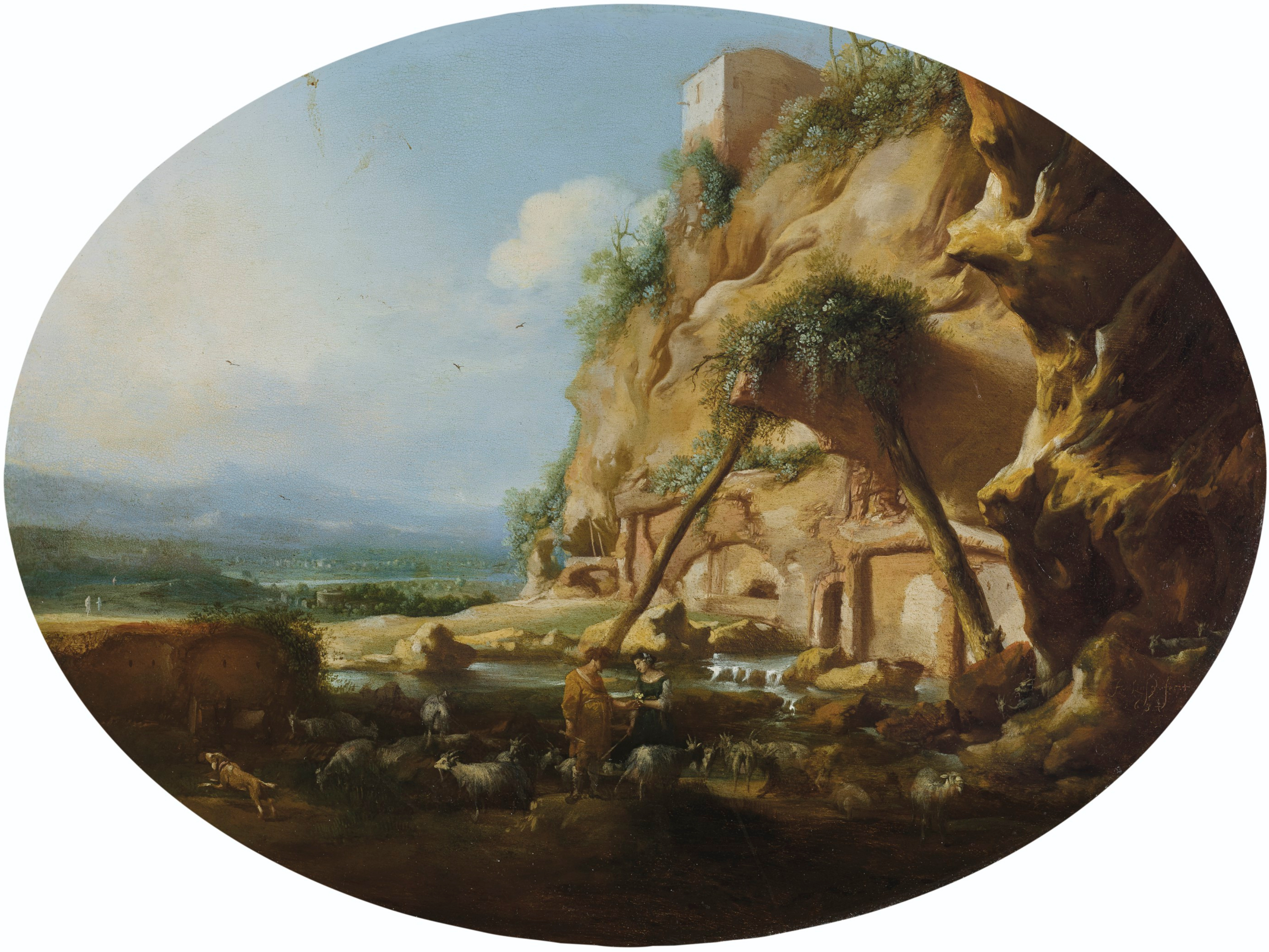
Italianate river landscape with a shepherd giving a maid a bouquet of flowers

While on a ship setting out from Italy for an unknown destination, he was captured by Moorish pirates. He was brought to the coast where he was robbed from all his possessions. He was led to the leader of the pirates and was able to survive this episode due to an exceptional event. He later painted a scene of this encounter that still hung in Hoorn when the Dutch biographer Arnold Houbraken was writing his work De groote schouburgh der Nederlantsche konstschilders en schilderessen published in 1718.

He died young when during an argument over a card game at the inn "Croon van Sweden" in Hoorn, he was stabbed by another cardplayer who was his friend. He died shortly after.

== Work ==
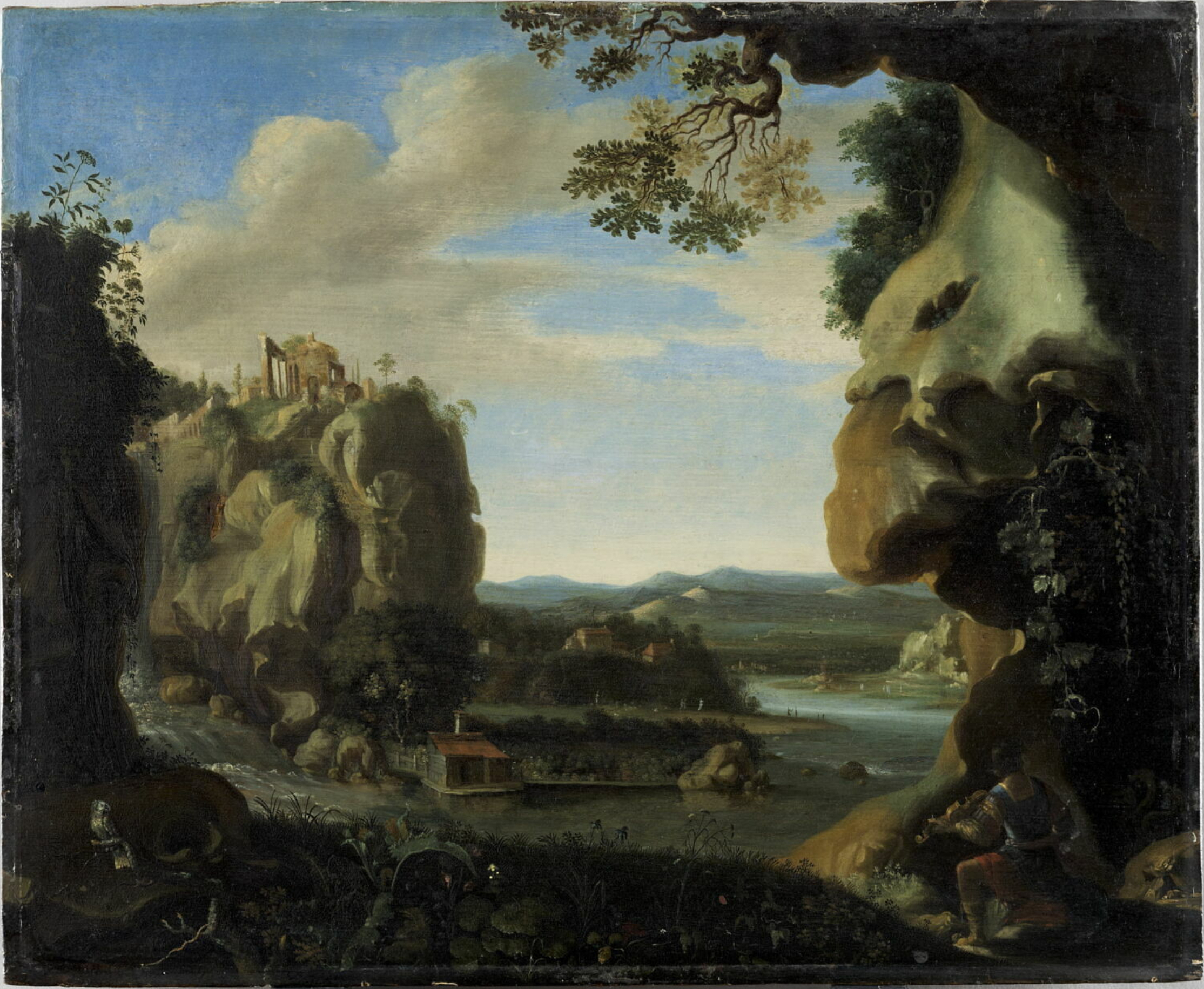
Orpheus playing the violin at the entrance to Hell

The known work of Linsen is limited and consists of about 10 paintings and a drawing. Linsen's corpus principally comprises historical, mythological, and biblical scenes set in wide landscape settings. He is considered a follower of Cornelis van Poelenburch and Bartholomeus Breenbergh.
