= Francis van Bossuit =

Flemish sculptor

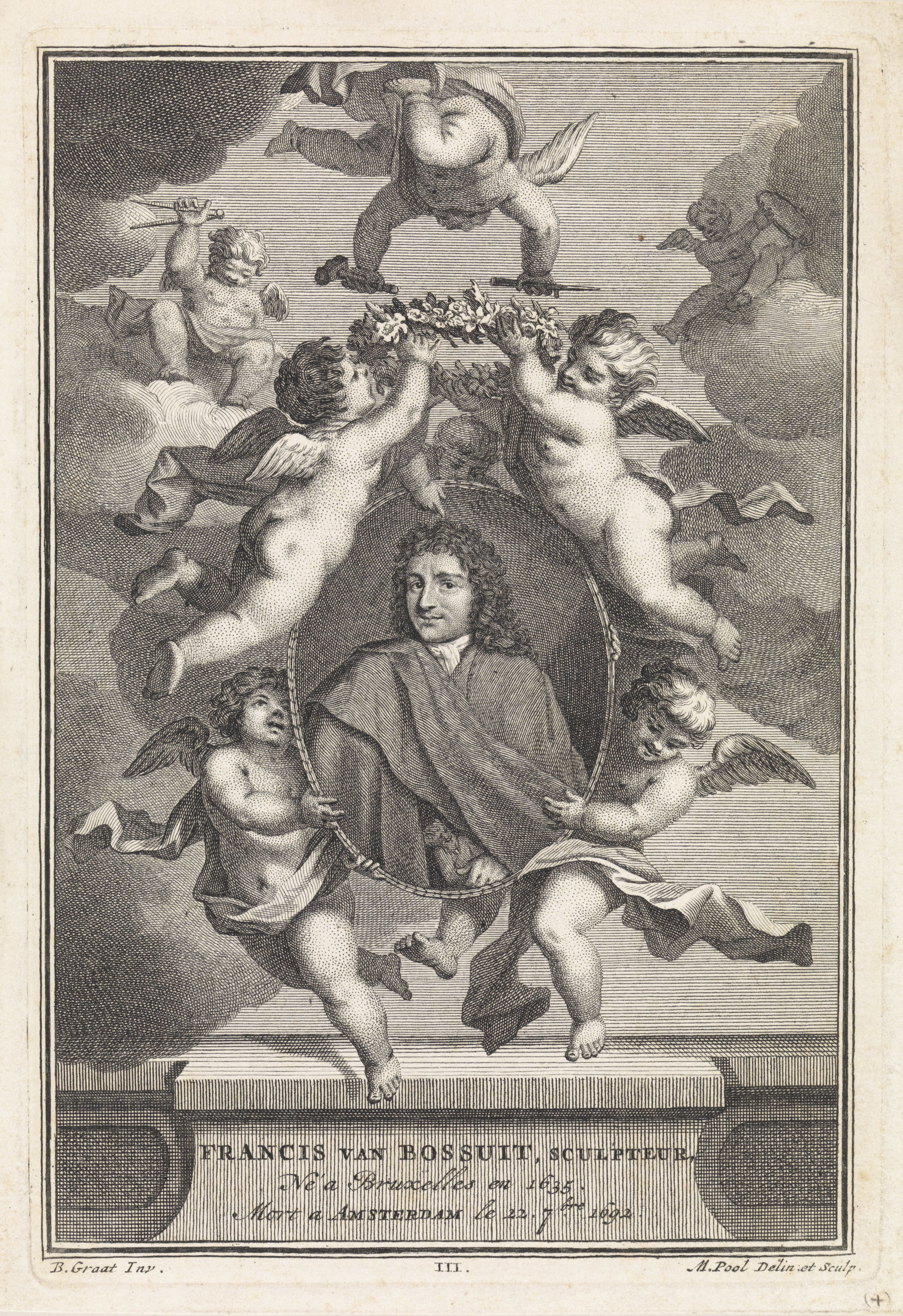
Allegorical portrait of Francis van Bossuit

Francis van Bossuit (probably 1635, Brussels - 22 September 1692, Amsterdam) was a Flemish sculptor. He mainly carved sculptures in ivory. Only a few sculptures in wood and terracotta by his hand are known. His work shows a penchant for classicism which was probably derived from his exposure to ancient and contemporary Italian art during his stay in Rome as well as his knowledge of the Baroque classicism of the sculptors active in Versailles. The exuberance of some of his works also reflects his training in Flemish Baroque sculpture.

== Life ==
There is little documentary information about van Bossuit's life. In 1727, Matthys Pool published in Amsterdam the Beeld-snijders kunst-kabinet door den vermaarden beeldsnijder Francis van Bossuit in yvoor gesneeden en geboetseert (English translation: Cabinet of sculpture carved and sculpted in ivory by the renowned sculptor Francis van Bossuit), a collection of ninety engravings after sculptures by van Bossuit, which was translated the same year into French as Cabinet de l'art de schulpture par le fameux sculpteur Francis Van Bossuit, exécuté en yvoire ou ébauché en terre, gravées d'après les desseins de Barent Graat, par Mattys Pool. The majority of the engravings were made by Matthys Pool from drawings by his father-in-law, the painter Barend Graat. The book contains a biography of van Bossuit based on information from Graat, who knew van Bossuit since his arrival in Amsterdam. Most of the information we have on van Bossuit can be traced back to this biographical note. It is not certain that this information is always correct.

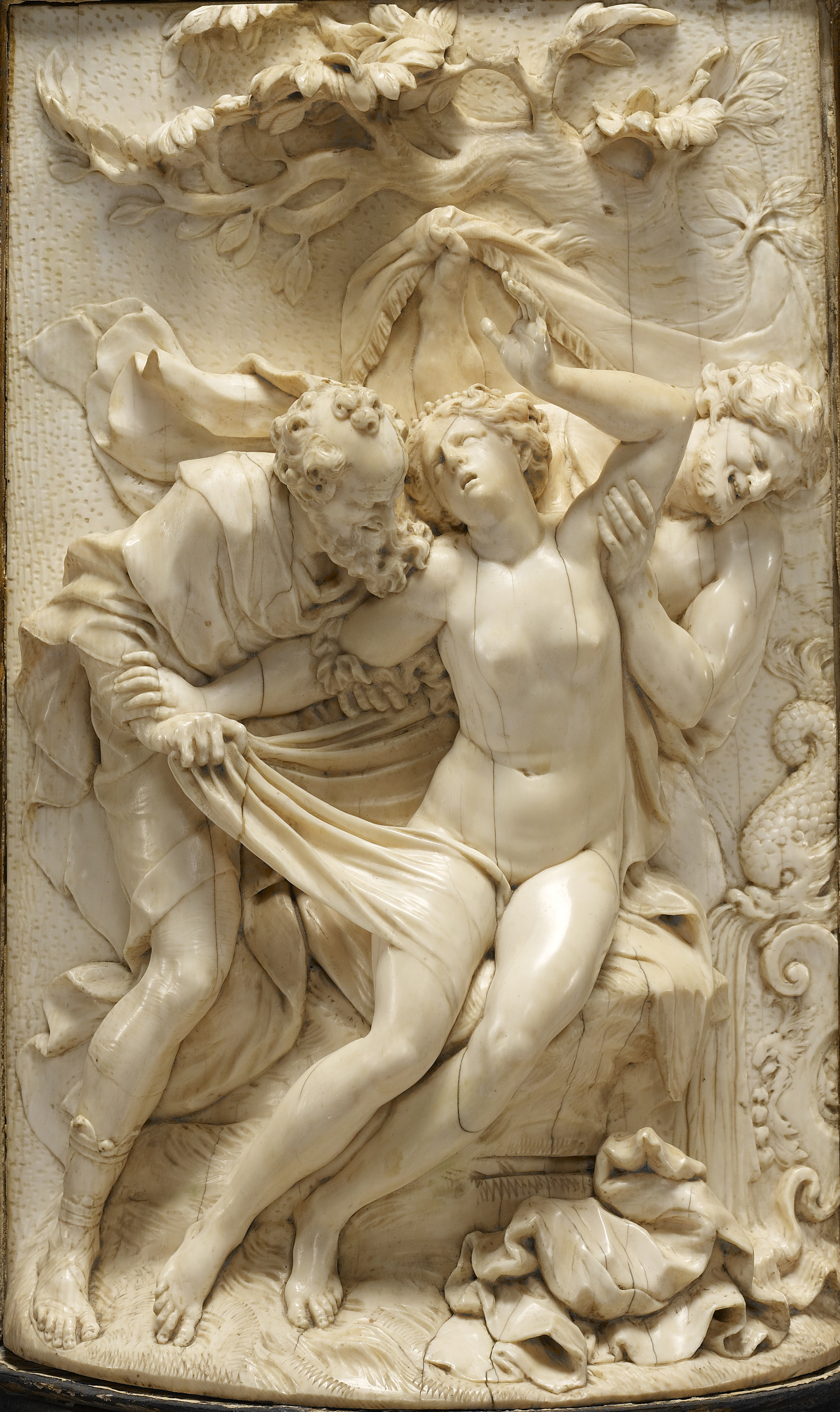
Susanna and the Elders

Van Bossuit was probably born in Brussels in 1635. No evidence of his birth has been found in the archives of this city. It is also possible that 1635 was not the year of his birth but the year in which he began his apprenticeship in Brussels. If he started his apprenticeship in 1635, he was probably born around 1620. According to older sources, he worked in Antwerp during the years 1645–1650.

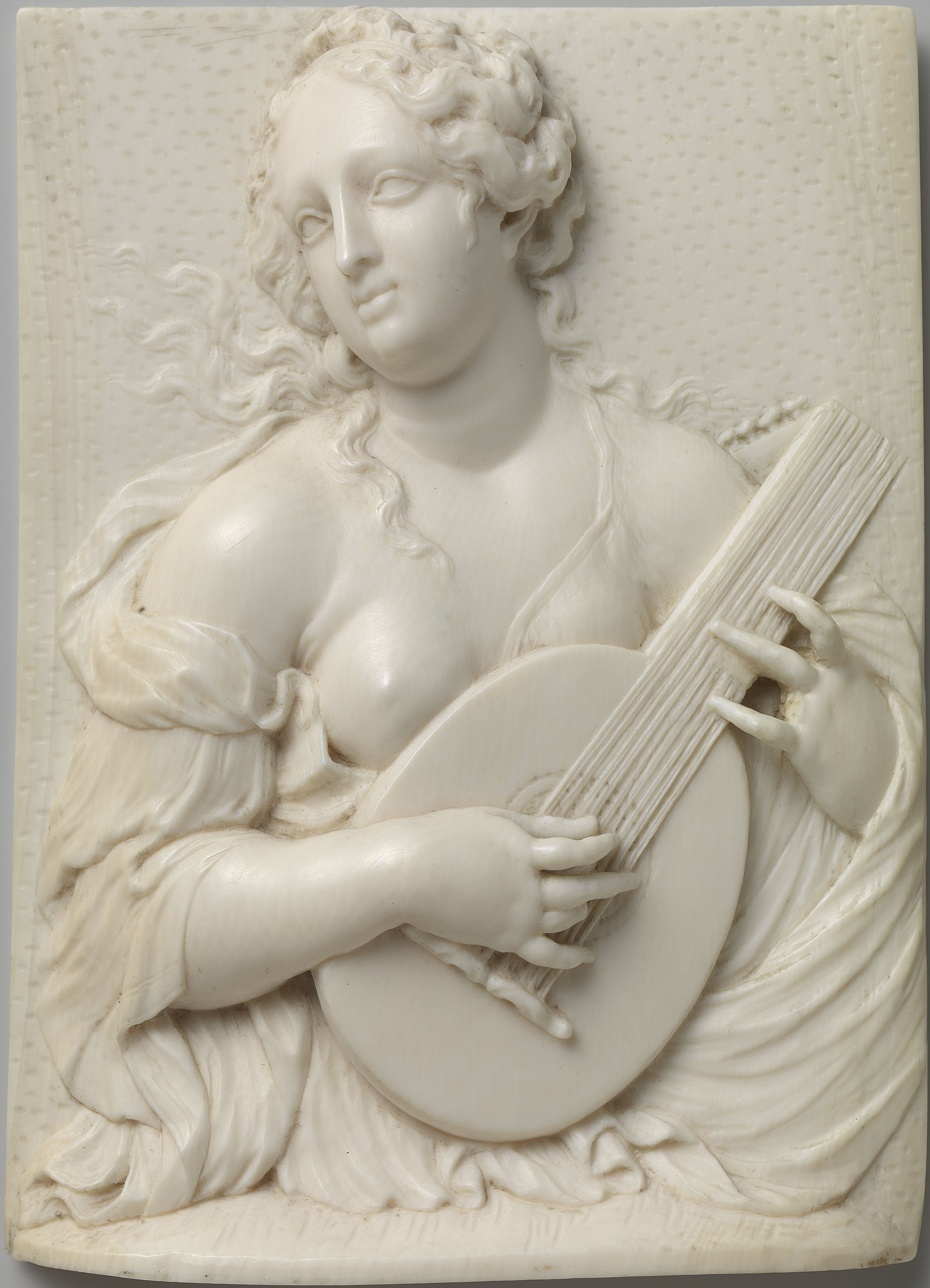
Allegory of music

He left for Italy probably in the hope of being appointed to one of the courts, where there was traditionally a great deal of interest in ivory carving. The Medici in Florence, for example, had a large collection of ivory carvings. It is assumed that this is why he first went to Florence, where, probably in the mid-1650s, he would have been in contact at the Academy of Florence with the German sculptor Balthasar Permoser. He may have worked in Modena in the mid-1650s. This hypothesis is probably based on the presence of two of his early works in the Galleria Estense.

He is believed to have resided in Rome between about 1655 and 1680. It is assumed that he associated himself mainly with the circle of students of the Florentine academy. The Cabinet of the Art of Sculpture mentions that in Rome he became a member of Bentvueghels, an association of mainly Dutch and Flemish artists working in Rome. It was customary for the Bentvueghels to adopt an attractive nickname. Van Bossuit is said to have adopted the nickname "Waarnemer" (Observer), because he "observed the beautiful pieces and made them his own". However, this name does not appear on the lists of Bentveughels' nicknames currently known. During his residence in Rome he is said to have made many copies of antique statues.

Around 1680 he left Rome and traveled in the company of the Dutch painter Bonaventura van Overbeke. He settled in Amsterdam where he seems to have been in contact with the young sculptor Johannes Ebbelaer (c. 1666–1706). Two auction catalogues mention sculptures begun by van Bossuit and completed by Ebbelaer. Ebbelaer also left in his will a "statue of Mars and a statue of Christ, made by the late Mr Francis and a sculpted statuette of Atlas".

Van Bossuit's small collectable reliefs in ivory were much sought after by private collectors in the Dutch Republic. Dutch collectors Petronella de la Court and her husband Adam Oortmans owned about ten other ivories by van Bossuit. Oortmans may even have studied ivory sculpture under van Bossuit.

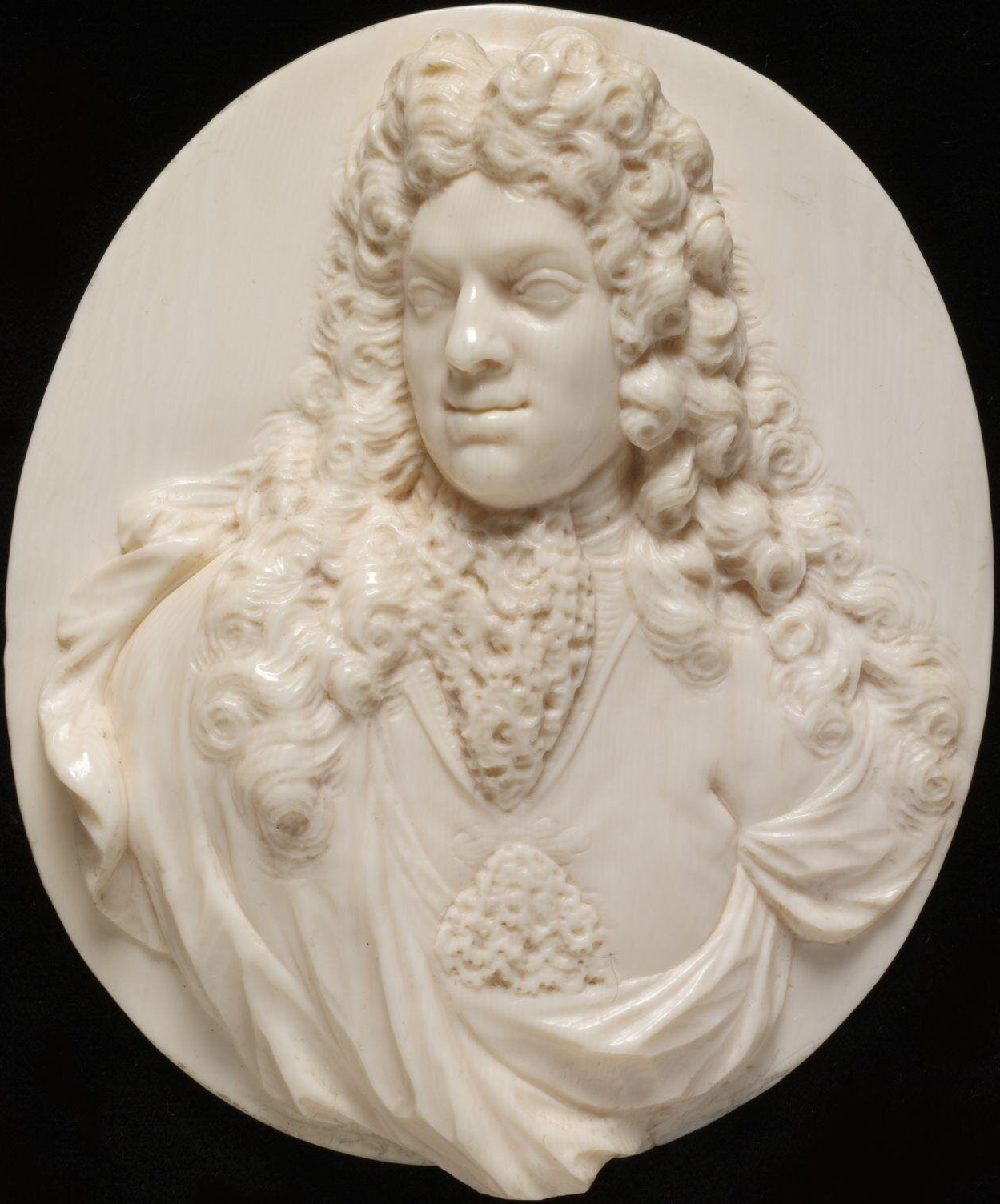
Portrait of Nicolaes Witsen, Burgomaster of Amsterdam

Van Bossuit remained in Amsterdam until his death on 22 September 1692.

== Work ==
The majority of his work consists of ivory sculptures, mainly small reliefs. He also produced works in wood and terracotta, of which only a few examples remain. His themes are biblical stories, mythological scenes, history, allegories and portraiture.

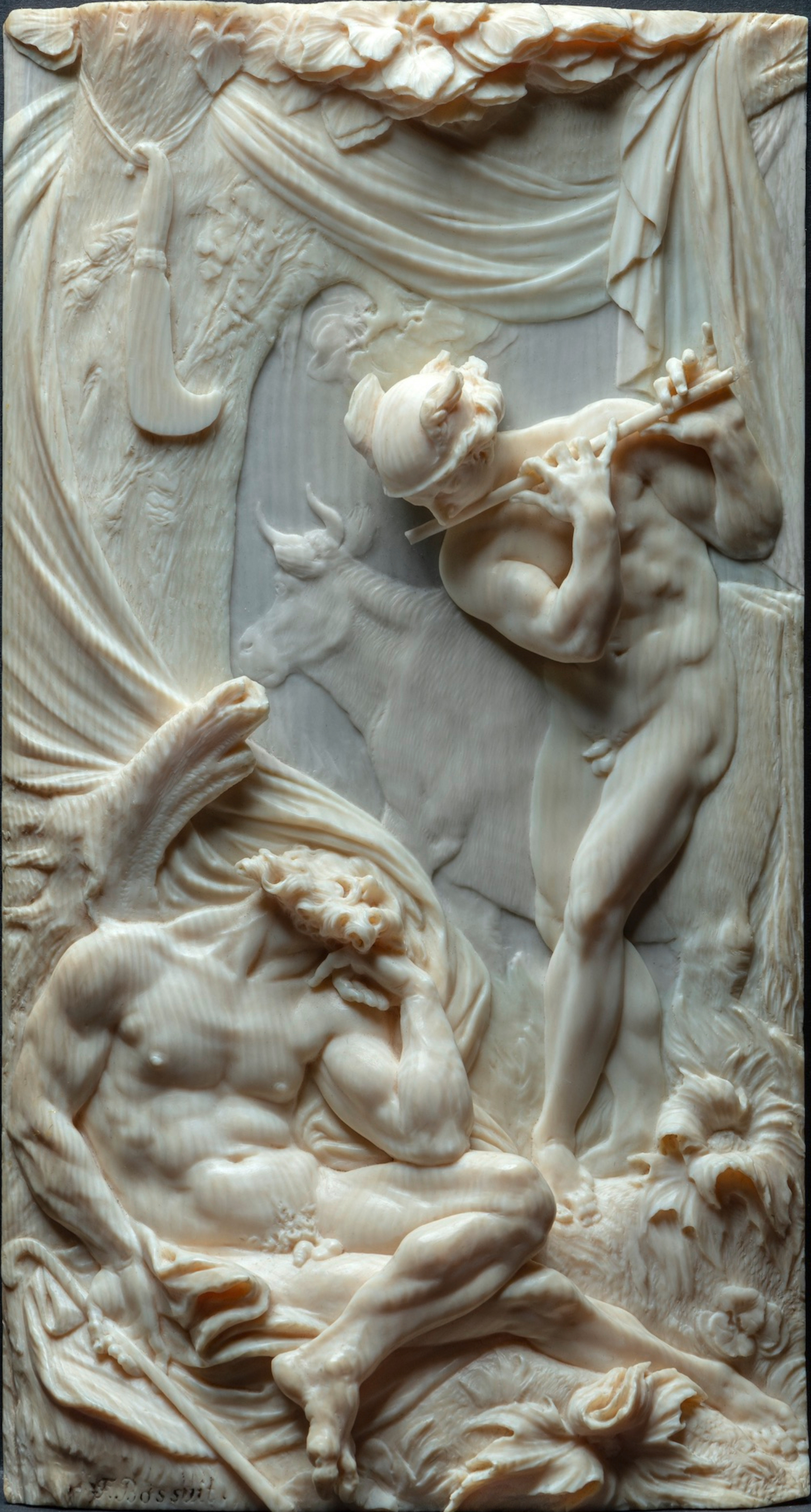
Mercury, Io and Argus

Nourished by his long stay in Italy, his work stands out for the infinite tenderness given to his subjects. It also shows a penchant for classicism, probably due to the exposure during his stay in Rome to ancient Italian art and contemporary sculptors such as the Flemish François Duquesnoy and the Italian sculptors Gian Lorenzo Bernini and Alessandro Algardi. It also shows he had absorbed the Baroque classicism of the sculptors active at Versailles. In the exuberance of some of his works, it also reflects his exposure to Flemish Baroque sculpture as practised by the Flemish sculptors Artus Quellinus the Younger, and Rombout Verhulst who were active for a long time in Amsterdam where they carried out important projects. This dynamic exuberance can be seen in works such as Venus and Adonis. (Rijksmuseum, Amsterdam).

Van Bossuit's small-scale sculptures introduced replicas and variations of famous masterpieces from Antiquity to Northern Europe. His Flora and Venus with Cupid, for example, are based on important classical sculptures. His first reliefs executed in Italy, such as Mercury, Io and Argus (Liebieghaus, Frankfurt) and its pendant The Flaying of Marsyas (Art Gallery of Ontario) were probably created while he was working in the vicinity of Balthasar Permoser, who created similar, but less finely sculpted works at about the same time in Italy. His Abduction of the Sabine Women (Liebieghaus, Frankfurt) is inspired by a work with the same subject by Pietro da Cortona (Capitoline Museums, Rome). His Judgement of Solomon is inspired by a fresco of da Cortona in the Palazzo Mattei in Rome. His later reliefs, such as the Allegory of Music (Rijksmuseum, Amsterdam), which is part of a series of allegories from sculpture and poetry, are monumentally designed and marked by a new sobriety.

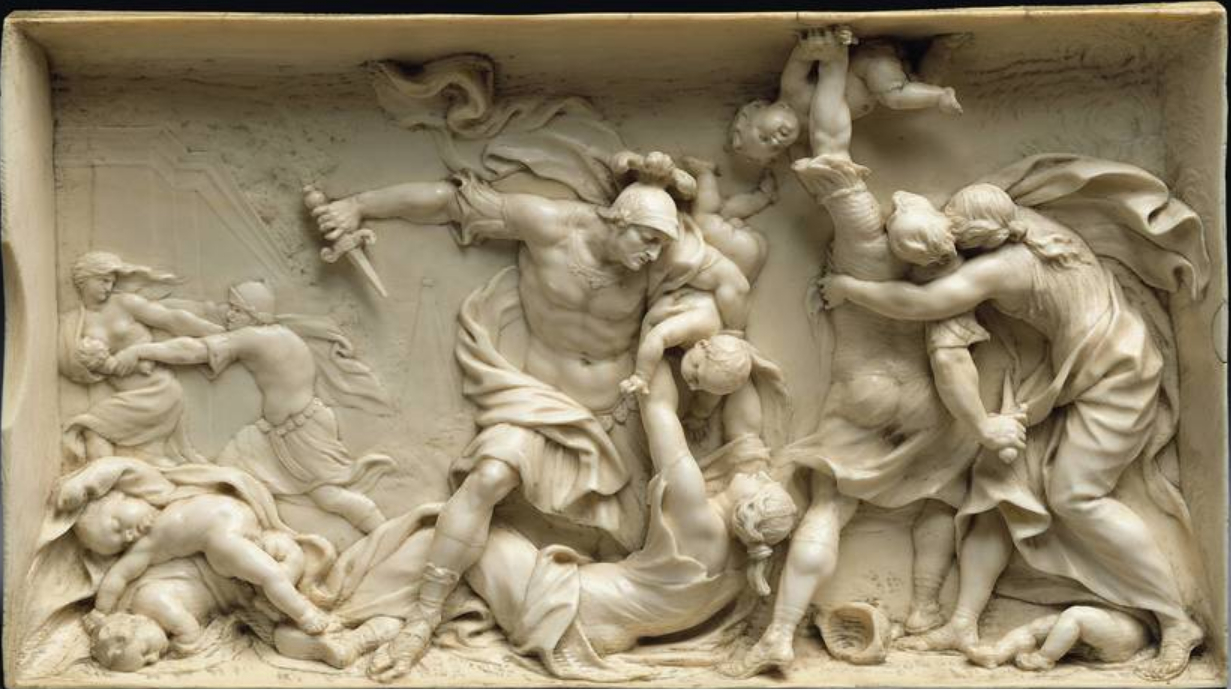
The massacre of the innocents

His works were popular with collectors of classicist cabinet sculptures and artists, who copied the sculptures and incorporated compositions and motifs into their paintings. Especially the engravings of his works, published in the "Cabinet of the Art of Sculpture" by Matthys Pool after drawings by Barend Graat served as models for artists until the 18th century. Graat probably started drawing after van Bossuit's sculptures in the 1680s. It seems likely that he was in direct contact with van Bossuit. The painter Nicolaas Verkolje was also inspired by Graat's drawings after van Bossuit and incorporated van Bossuit's motifs in four paintings. His Abduction of Proserpina, for example, is based on the relief representing The Abduction of the Sabine Women by van Bossuit. The Dutch painter Willem van Mieris (1662-1747) made a number of drawings after statues by Bossuit and derived postures and gestures of female figures in his history paintings from the motifs of van Bossuit. This is for instance the case in the figure of Ulysses in van Mieris' Circe begging Ulysses for mercy (c. 1700, formerly in the Sør Rusche Collection), which is very similar in pose, gesture and expression to the Mars by van Bossuit (Rijksmuseum, Amsterdam).
