= Domenicus van Wijnen =

Dutch Golden Age painter

- Born: 1658; Amsterdam
- Died: 1700 (aged 41–42)
- Occupation: Dutch 'Golden Age' Artist
- Parents: Dirk Harmens van Wijnen (father); Anna Geertuid Everaerdts (mother)

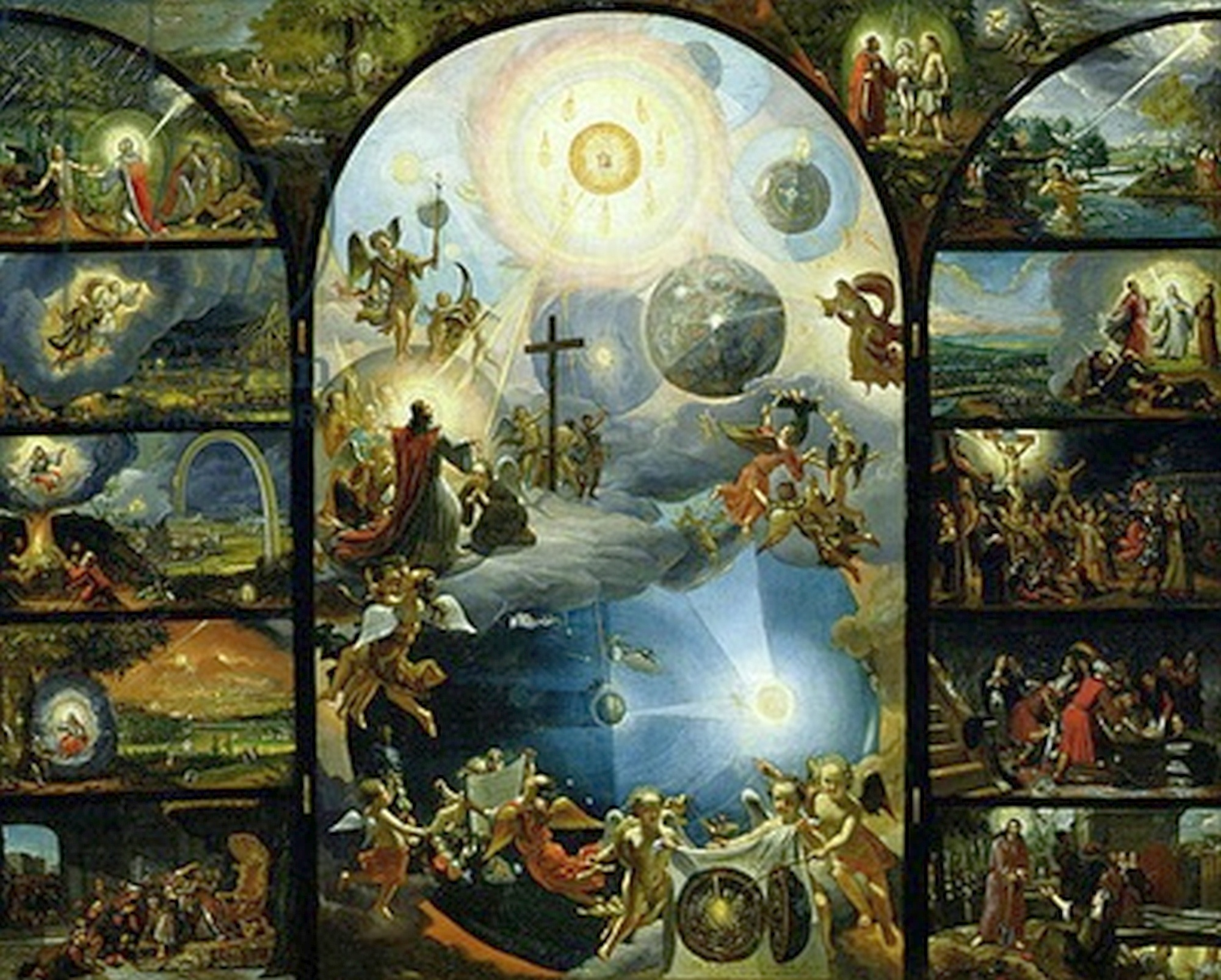
Allegory of the Creation of the Cosmos

Domenicus van Wijnen (Amsterdam 1658 – 1700) was a Dutch Golden Age painter.

== Biography ==
In 1674 he was a pupil of Willem Doudijns in The Hague. He lived in Rome from 1680–90. According to Houbraken he joined the Bentvueghels, an association of Netherlandish artists in Rome, with the nickname "Askaan". According to the RKD his bentname was "Ascanias".

He was a painter of historical allegories and conversation pieces. Several of the dozen or so paintings firmly attributed to him depict scenes of witchcraft. His painting The Temptation of Saint Anthony is in the National Gallery of Ireland.

== Family ==
Domenicus parents Dirk Harmens van Wijnen (1627-1659) and Anna Geertuid Everaedts (born 1616) married on 4 October 1657 after Dirk's first wife Maria Pijnappels died. Dirk died when Domenicus was 1 year old, his sister Dorothen (1660- ) was born a few months later. Domenicus' half siblings from Dirk's first marriage were Fransois van Wijnen (1644-1711), Hermanus van Wijnen (1646- ), Cornelis van Wijnen (1648-1649), Cornelis van Wijnen (1650-1651), Gabriel Dirk van Wijnen (1652-1723)
