= François van Knibbergen =

Dutch painter

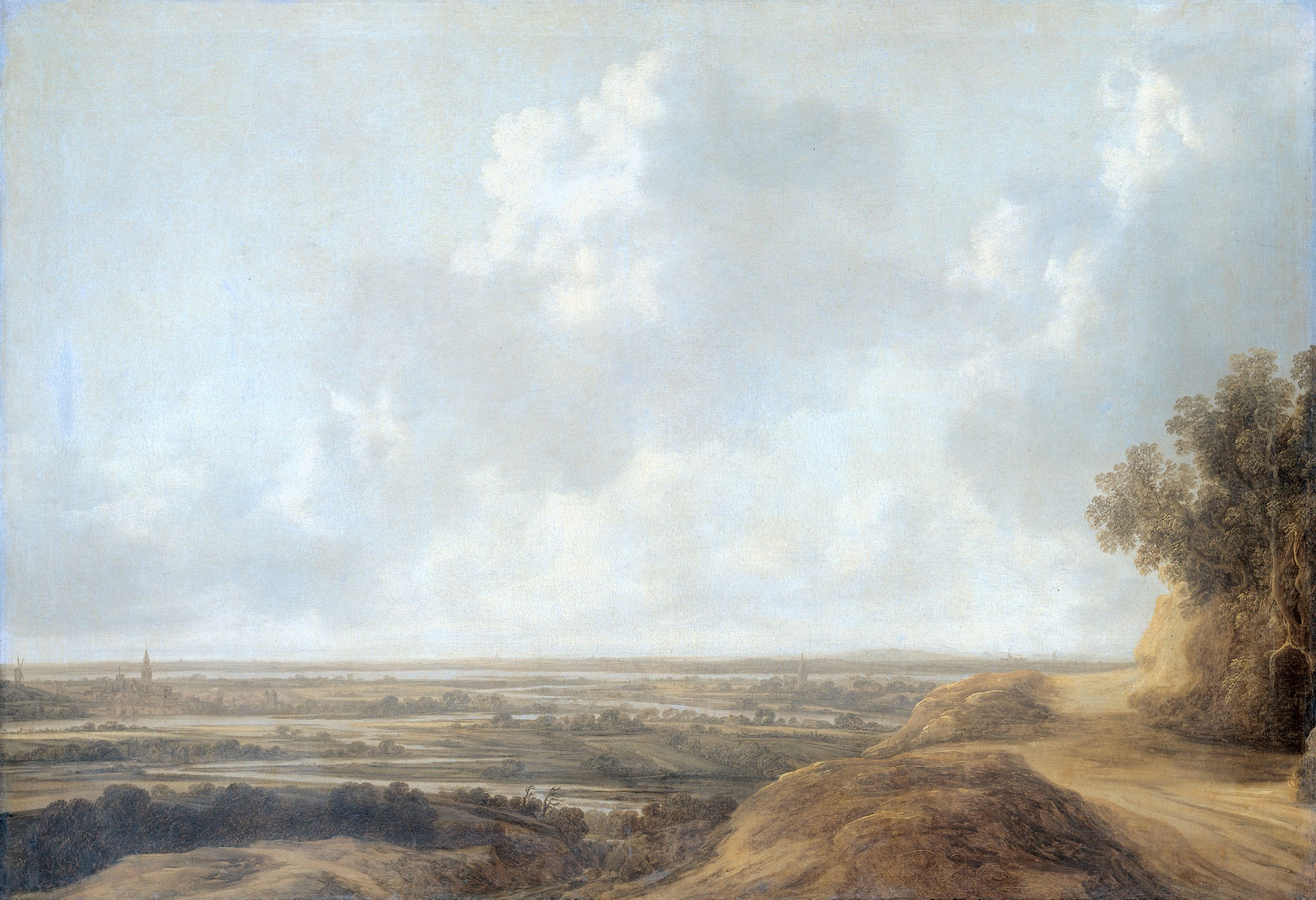
Dune landscape, 1665

François van Knibbergen (1596, The Hague – 1674), was a Dutch Golden Age landscape painter.

== Biography ==
According to Houbraken he took part in a painting contest with Jan van Goyen and Jan Porcellis. Of the three finished paintings, the one done by Porcellis was considered the best.

According to the RKD he was a pupil in The Hague of Michiel van den Sande from Utrecht, with whom he traveled to Rome in 1614. He was back in Utrecht in 1615 and became a member of the Confrerie Pictura in the Hague in 1629. His daughter Catharina also became a landscape painter.
