= Pieter Anthonisz. van Groenewegen =

Dutch Golden Age landscape painter

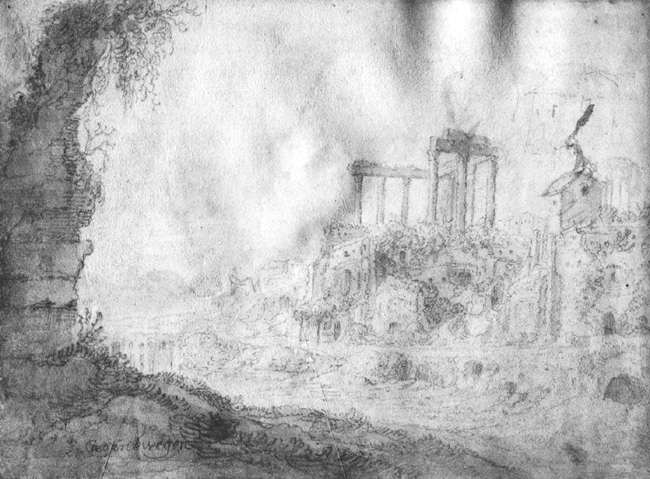
Landscape by Pieter Anthonisz. van Groenewegen, between 1635 and 1641, Fogg Museum

Pieter Anthonisz. van Groenewegen (1590/1600–1658) was a Dutch Golden Age landscape painter.

Groenewegen, who was born in Delft, primarily painted landscapes. He traveled to Italy and between ca. 1615-1623 he lived on Via Bocca de Leone in Rome, where he became a member of the Bentvueghels with the nickname "Leeuw"(Lion). He returned to Delft where he became a member of the Guild of Saint Luke in 1626, but spent the last few years of his life in The Hague, where he joined the Confrerie Pictura in 1657. He died there in the following year. Many of his works now reside at the Rijksmuseum Amsterdam.
