= Bentvueghels =

Former artist society in Rome, Italy

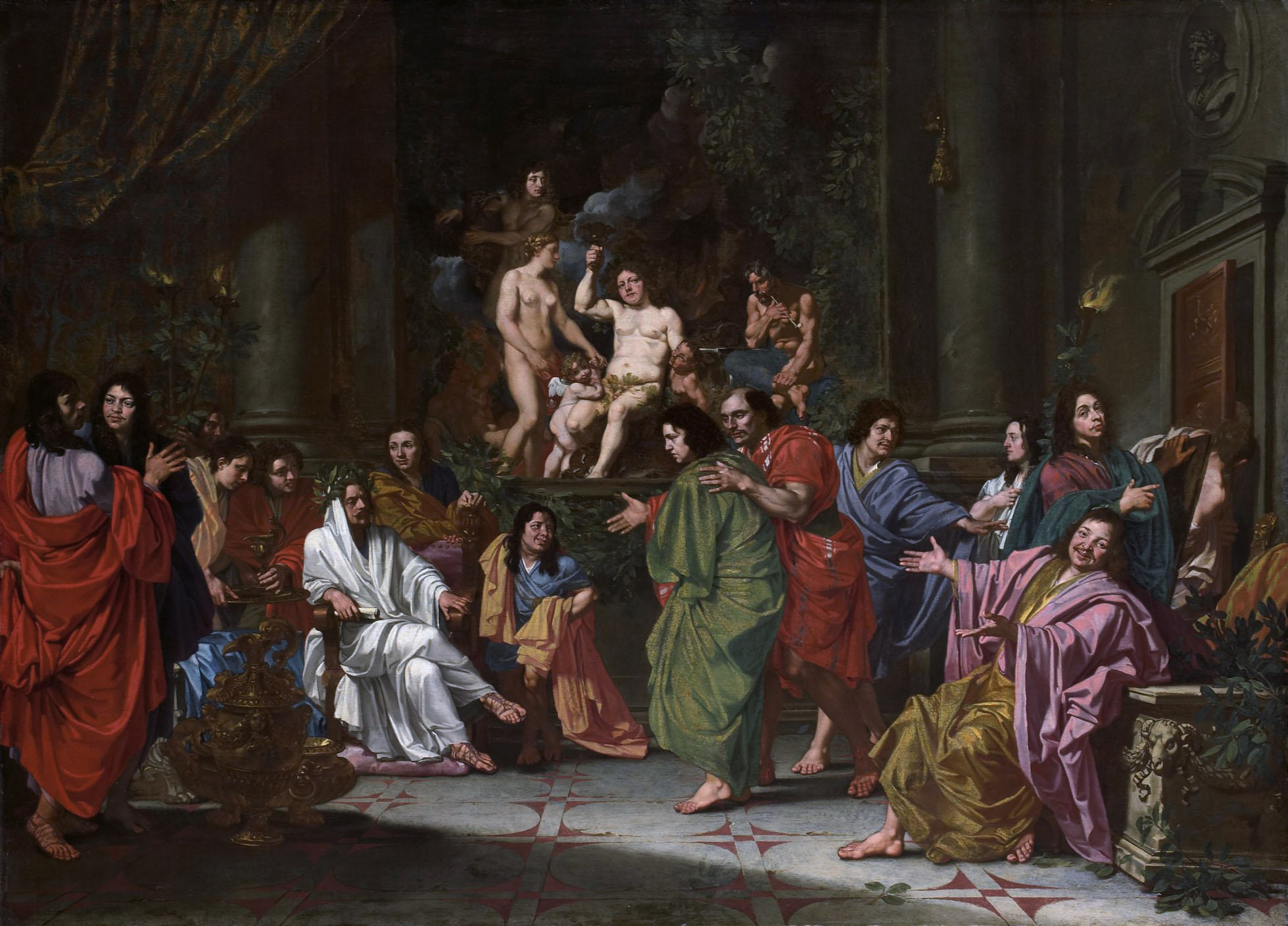
Initiation of a Bentvueghel, unknown artist, ca 1660, Rijksmuseum Amsterdam

The Bentvueghels (meaning in 17th-century Dutch "birds of a feather") were an informal confraternity of mostly Dutch and Flemish artists active in Rome from about 1620 to 1720. They are also known as the Schildersbent ("painters' clique") or simply the Bent. They were known for their rowdy parties and anti-etablishment attitudes. The confraternity did not have any stated purposes or goals. The Bentvueghels served as a sociocultural and professional network for Netherlandish artists in Rome.

== Activities ==
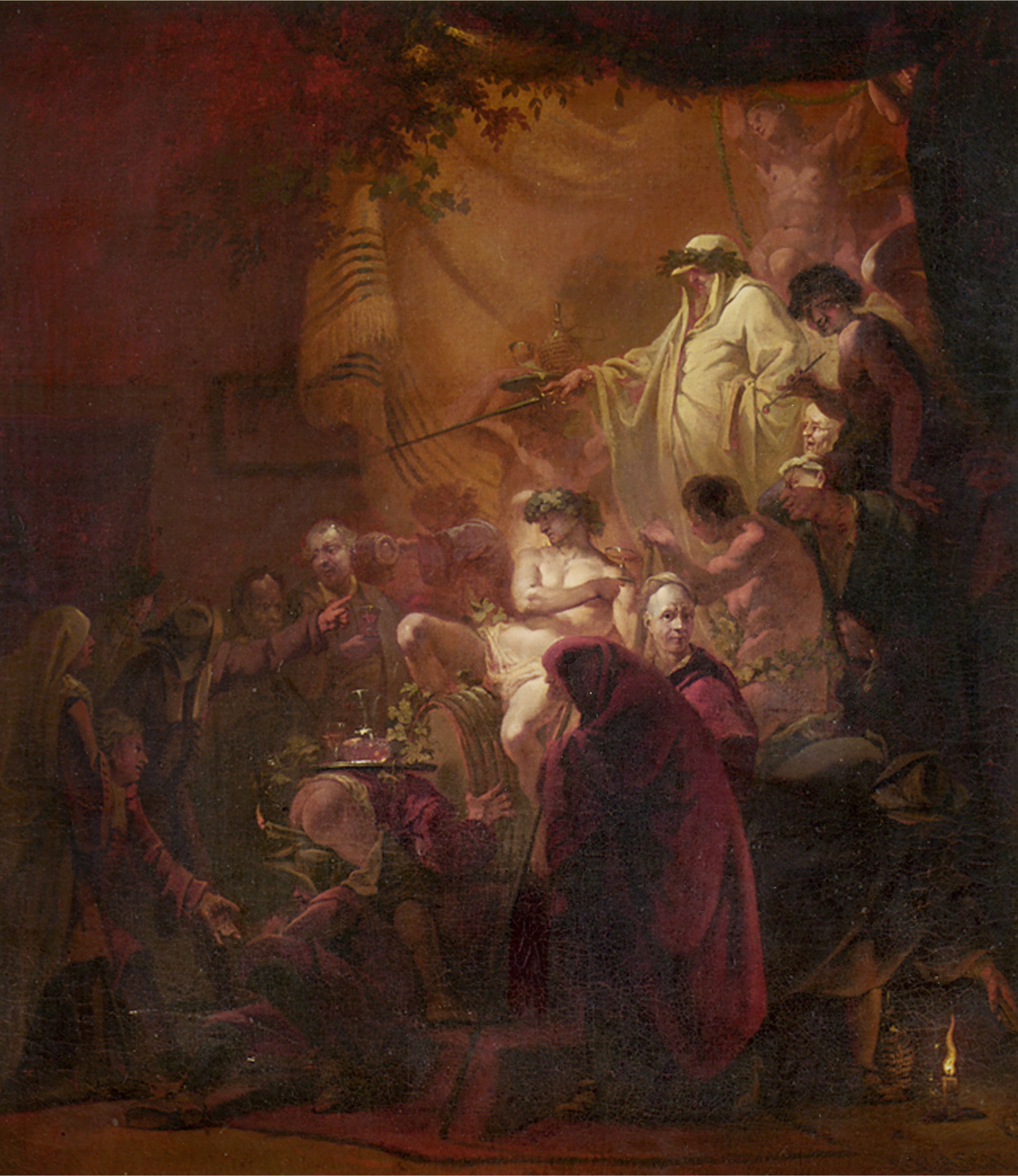
Initiation of a member of the Bentvueghels by Domenicus van Wijnen, 1680s

The members, which included painters, sculptors, printmakers, goldsmiths, poets and at least one known apothecary all lived in different parts of the city (mostly the parishes of Santa Maria del Popolo and San Lorenzo in Lucina in the north of the city) and came together for social and intellectual reasons. Although predominantly made up of Flemish and Dutch artists, a few other members were admitted, including Joachim von Sandrart and Valentin de Boulogne.

The group was well known for its drunken, Bacchic initiation rituals (paid for by the initiate). At the initiation the new member received a nickname or "bentnaam" (bent name), which was typically based on some attribute of the new member. The bent name was often that of a classical god or hero, such as Bacchus, Cupid, Hector, Meleager, Cephalus, Pyramus, Orpheus. Some names were witty or mildly obscene in line with the rather unruly and subversive attitude of the cofraternity. At the ceremony the new member also received his bent letter of admission.

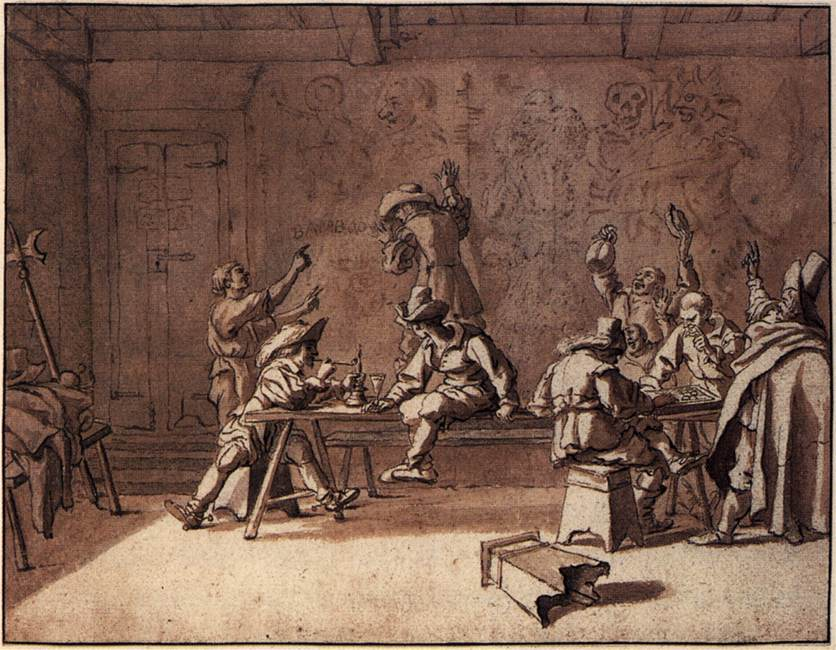
Bentvueghels in a Roman Tavern, by Pieter van Laer

The initiation celebrations, sometimes lasting up to 24 hours, concluded with the group marching to the church of Santa Costanza, known popularly at the time as the Temple of Bacchus. There they made libations to Bacchus before the porphyry sarcophagus of Constantina (now in the Vatican Museums), which was considered to be his tomb because of its Bacchic motifs. A list of its members may still be seen in one of this church's side chapels. This practice was finally banned by Pope Clement XI in 1720.

Despite the rowdy nature of these initiations, an intellectual quality was maintained. Joachim von Sandrart, for example, wrote in his 1675–1679 book, Teutsche Academie der edlen Bau-, Bild und Malereikünste (German Academy of the Noble Arts of Architecture, Sculpture and Painting), that his "baptism" included "reasoned discourses, undertaken by French and Italians, as well as by Germans and Netherlanders, each in his own tongue." Also Cornelis de Bruijn wrote about the rituals he had to undergo in 1676 and made some engravings, which he published in 1698. De Bruijn also made a remark hinting that the group's members mostly perceived Raphael to be their founder.

== The Bentvueghels and the Accademia di San Luca ==
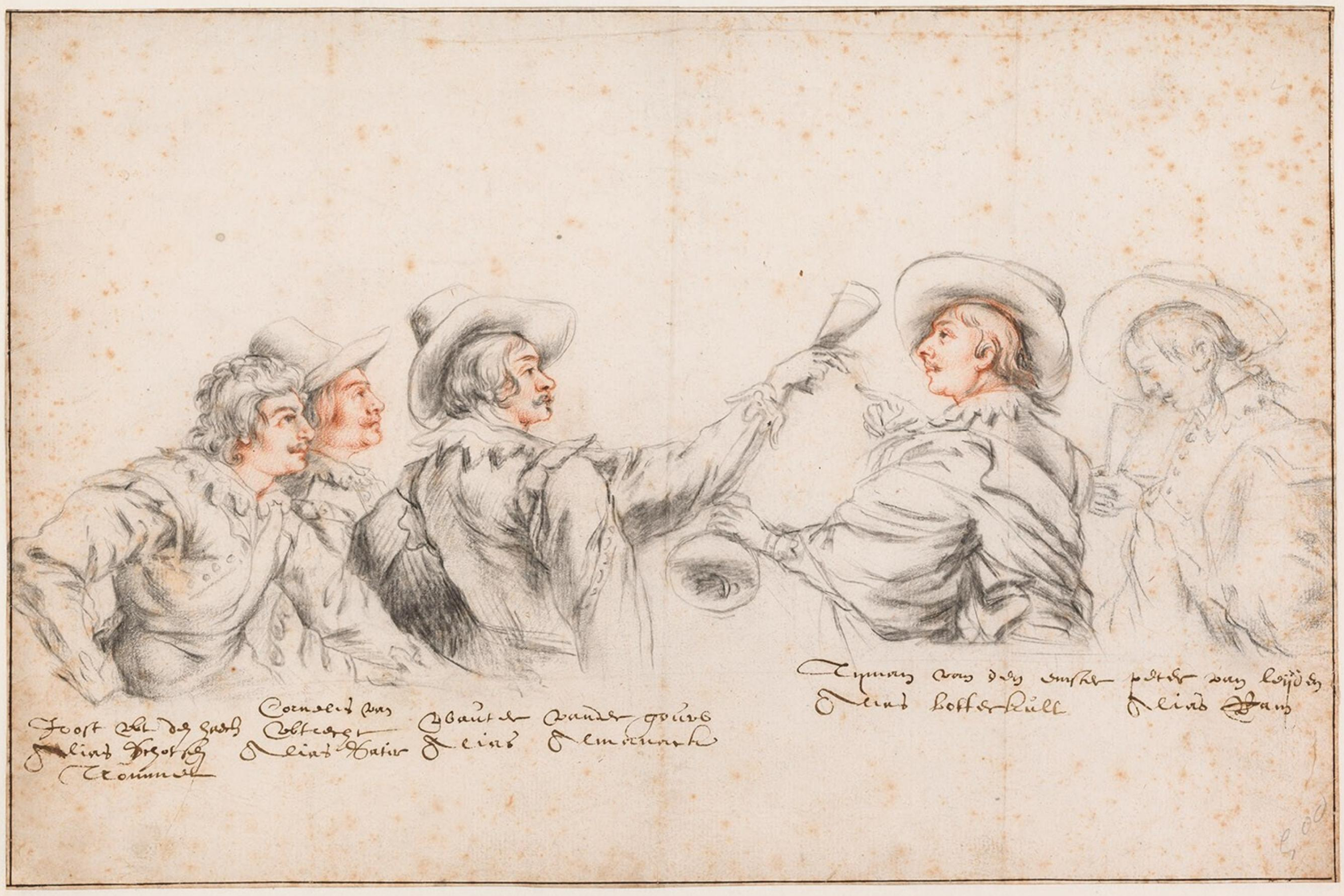
Anonymous drawing of members, Museum Boijmans Van Beuningen. From left to right: Joost from The Hague (bent-name Schotsen trommel), Cornelis (Poelenburgh) from Utrecht (bent-name Satier), Wouter (Crabeth) from Gou (bent-name Almanack), Tyman (Cracht) from Emster (bent-name Botterkull) and Peter from Leiden (bent-name Ram).

The Bentvueghels were frequently at odds with Rome's Accademia di San Luca ("Academy of Saint Luke"), which had the purpose of elevating the work of "artists" above that of craftsmen. Art historians have often emphasized the low-brow qualities of the Bentvueghels's activities over their intellectual and artistic pursuits. David Levine suggests instead that "academic art-pedagogy, with its emphasis on repetitive copying, might well have struck members of the Bent [the Bentvueghels] as a low, mechanical process in contrast to their truly humanistic approach." Artists such as Pieter van Laer belonged to both organisations showing that the relationship between the Bentvueghels and the Accademia were not always antagonistic. In fact, many of the Bentvueghels are known to have engaged with Antique sculpture and drawing from life showing thus an interest in the classical past and a dedication to academic discipline.

Travel to Italy had become a rite of passage for young Dutch and Flemish artists after the publication of Karel van Mander's Schilder-boeck in 1604. Often encompassing a difficult and in many cases dangerous journey, artists would spend years getting to Italy, using their artistic talents to pay their way. Many never made it all the way to Italy, and many never attempted the trip back once they got there. On arrival, artists were generally fairly established thanks to their work experience acquired along the way. At the same time many were still young and unknown. What many shared by the time they arrived in Rome was an overwhelming confidence in their ability to live from their own work, and membership in the Accademia may therefore have felt of little importance to them.

== Known members ==
The earliest-known publication listing the members is the book by Arnold Houbraken, an artist and engraver who never traveled to Italy, but who used the Bentvueghels membership list as a source for his book, De groote schouburgh der Nederlantsche konstschilders en schilderessen, in 1718. Whenever possible, he gives the nickname or bent of the painter in his biographical sketches.

The original members of the group were also depicted in a series of drawings made around 1620. Among those appearing in the drawings are Cornelis van Poelenburch, Bartholomeus Breenbergh, Dirck van Baburen, Paulus Bor, Cornelis Schut and Simon Ardé.

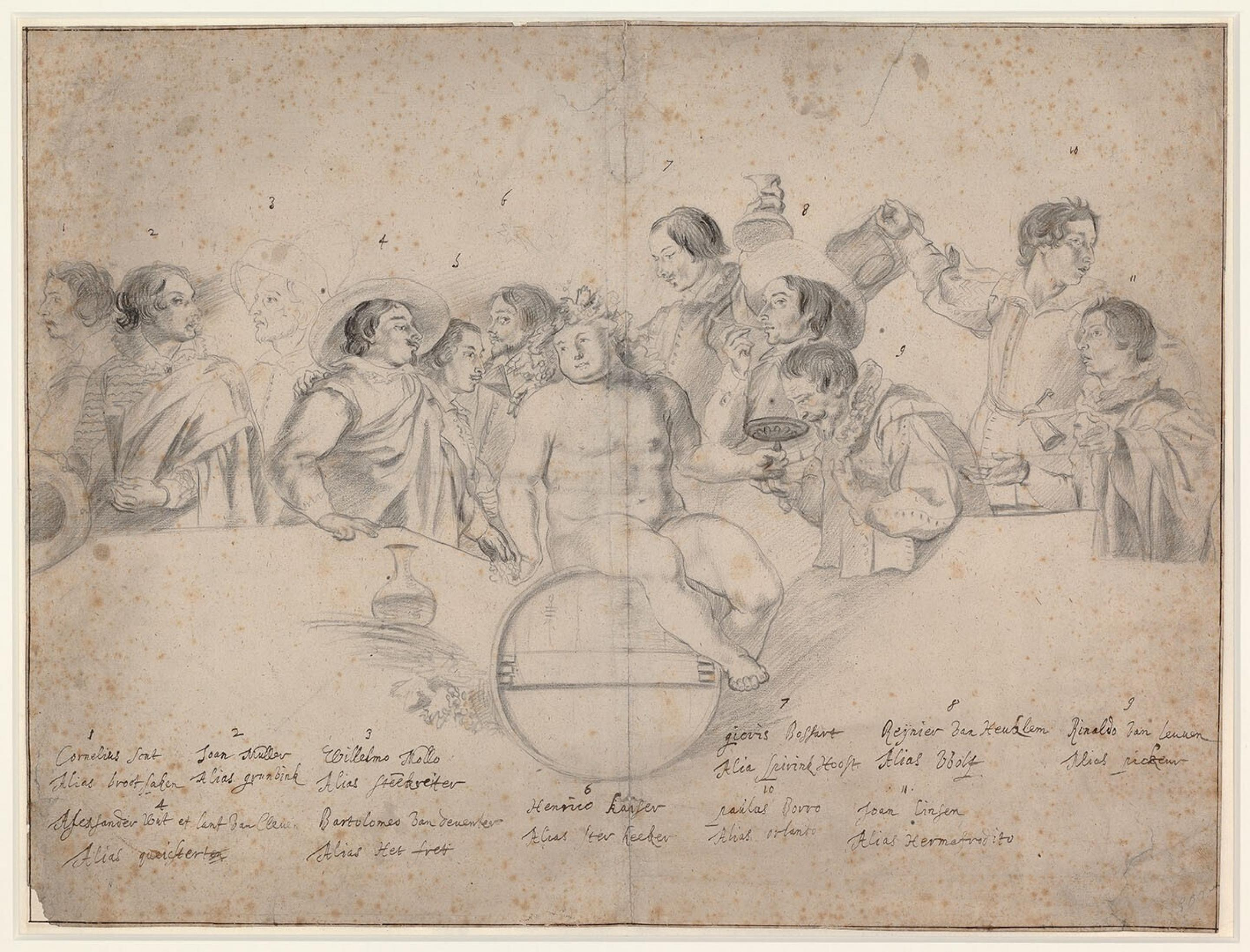
Portraits of Eleven Bentvueghels, ca. 1623, Museum Boijmans Van Beuningen

Some of the members with known aliases or 'bent'-names:

- Willem van Aelst – "Vogelverschrikker" ("Scarecrow")
- Simon Ardé – "Tovenaer" ("Wizard")
- Jan Asselijn – "Crabbetje" ("Little crab"), because of a handicap on his right hand
- Dirck van Baburen – "Biervlieg" ("Beer fly")
- David Beck – "Gulden scepter"
- Jan van Bijlert – "Aeneas" (one of the founders)
- Cornelis Bloemaert – "Winter"
- Jan Frans van Bloemen – "Orizonte"
- Norbert van Bloemen – "Cefalus"
- Pieter van Bloemen – "Standaart " or "Stendardo" ("Standard")
- Jacques Blondeau – "Weyman" ("Meadow man")
- Jan Boeckhorst – "Lange Jan" ("Tall John")
- Paulus Bor – "Orlando"
- Francis van Bossuit – "Waarnemer" ("Delegate")
- Valentin de Boulogne – "Innamorato" ("Lover or Valentine")
- Leonard Bramer – "Nestelghat" ("Fidget")
- Bartholomeus Breenbergh – "Het Fret" ("the Ferret")
- Abraham Brueghel – "Rijngraaf" or "Ringraaf" (the "Duke of the Rhine", which was an old aristocratic title in Northern Europe)
- Jan Baptist Brueghel – "Meleager"
- Cornelis de Bruijn – "Adonis"
- Joost Campen (also called Kampen and Lampen) – "Stokkade"
- Wouter Crabeth II – "Almanack" ("Almanac")
- Tyman Arentsz. Cracht – "Botterkull" or "Botterkull" ("Butter ball")
- Ignatius Croon – "Gaudtvinck" or "Goudtvinck" ("Bullfinch")
- Willem Doudijns – "Diomedes"
- Karel Dujardin – "Barba di Becco" or "Bokkebaart" ("Goat-beard")
- Jan Fyt – "Goudvink" ("Goldfinch")
- Wybrand de Geest – "De Friesche Adelaar" (Frisian Eagle)
- Abraham Genoels – "Archimedes"
- Pieter Groenewegen – "Leeuw" ("Lion")
- Reynier van Heuckelom – "Wolf"
- Samuel van Hoogstraten – "Batavier" ("Batavian")
- Pieter van der Hulst – "Zonnebloem" ("Sunflower")
- Willem van Ingen – "Den Eersten" ("The first one")
- Adriaen van der Kabel – "Geestigheid" ("Humour")
- Gerard van Kuijl – "Stijgbeugel" ("Stirrup")
- Pieter van Laer – "Il Bamboccio" ("the big doll")
- Jan Linsen – "Hermafrodiet" ("Hermaphrodite")
- Jacob Leyssens – "Notenkraker" ("Nutcracker")
- Hendrik Frans van Lint – "Studie" ("Study")
- Johann Liss – "Pan"
- Willem Molijn – another founder
- Jan Miel – "Honingh-Bie"/"Bieco" ("Honey Bee"), a pun on his surname.
- Pieter Mulier the Younger – "Tempeest" ("Tempest")
- Franciscus de Neve (II) – "Bloosaerken" ("Little blower")
- Reinier van Persijn – "Narcissis" ("Narcissus")
- Cornelis van Poelenburgh – "Satyr", also a founder
- Christoffel Puytlinck – "Trechter" ("Funnel")
- Luigi Primo – "Gentiel" or "Gentile" ("Gentle")
- Otto Marseus van Schrieck – "Snuffelaer" ("Sniffer")
- Jacob van Staverden – "Ijver" ("Diligence")
- Herman van Swanevelt – "Heremiet" ("Hermit")
- Augustinus Terwesten – "Patrysvogel" ("Partridge")
- Robert du Val – "La Fortune"
- Pieter Verbrugghen II – "Ballon" ("Balloon")
- Karel van Vogelaer – "Distelbloem"
- Jan Baptist Weenix – "Ratel" ("Rattle", because of a speech defect)
- Domenicus van Wijnen – "Ascanias" or "Askaan" (Ascanios was the son of the Greek hero Aeneas)
- Theodoor Wilkens – "Goedewil" ("Good intention")
- Matthias Withoos – "Calzetta bianca" ("White Hose")
- Gaspar de Witte – "Grondel" ("Gudgeon")
- Johan Zierneels – "Lely" or "Lelie" ("Lily")

== Sources ==
- Some of the information here is taken from the corresponding Dutch article about the Bentvueghels.
- Haskell, Francis, Patrons and Painters: Art and Society in Baroque Italy, Yale University Press, 1980. ISBN 0-300-02537-8
- Kilian, Jennifer M., "Jan Baptist [Giovanni Battista] Weenix," Grove Art Online. Oxford University Press, [29 October 2007].
- Levine, David A., "The Bentvueghels: 'Bande Académique"," in IL60: Essays Honoring Irving Lavin on his Sixtieth Birthday, ed. Marilyn Aronberg Lavin. New York: Italica Press, 1990 (pp. 207–219). ISBN 0-934977-18-6.
- Levine, David A., "Schildersbent [Bent]," Grove Art Online. Oxford University Press, [15 March 2007].
- Slive, Seymour. Dutch Painting 1600–1800. Yale University Press Pelican history of Art. New Haven, Conn: Yale University Press, 1995. ISBN 0-300-06418-7.
