= Adriaen Honich =

Dutch Golden Age landscape painter

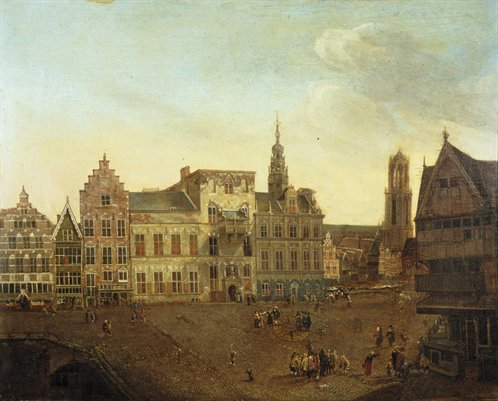
Stadhuisbrug, Utrecht, 1663

Adriaen Honich (1643, Dordrecht – c.1684), was a Dutch Golden Age landscape painter.

== Biography ==
According to Houbraken, who mentioned him three times with different spellings of his name, he was known as "Lossenbruy" in a poem about the Bentvueghels, where he was called Adriaan Honing, landscape painter from Dordrecht. He was mentioned as Adriaan Honich when he signed Abraham Genoels' bentbrief, and he was mentioned as Adriaan Honig, or Lossenbruier, when he made the acquaintance of Jan van Bunnik in Rome.

According to the RKD he is known for italianate landscapes, but his whereabouts after 1674 (when he signed Genoels' bentbrief) are unknown. Some still life drawings are attributed to him. He died before 1694.
