= Jan van Bunnik =

Dutch painter

Jan van Bunnik (1654–1727) was a Dutch Golden Age landscape painter.

== Biography ==
He was born at Utrecht in 1654 where he was sent to learn draftsmanship from Herman Saftleven in 1668, under whom he studied three years; he afterwards spent some time in the Duchy of Cleves and met Gerard Hoet, who convinced him to visit Italy. According to Houbraken, who devoted three pages to his biography, he started his trip to Italy in Rees, Germany with a Opperste Sales, and then set off for Frankfurt on foot, where he spent some time with his art colleague Merian; either Maria Sibylla Merian, or a son of Matthäus Merian he had met in Utrecht, who would then have been studying with his stepfather Jacob Marrel in Frankfurt. From there he travelled to Heidelberg, and from there to Speyer, where he worked for Charles I Louis, Elector Palatine and Raadsheer Jonkmans. From there he travelled to Strasbourg, from there to Zurich, and from there over the alps to Milan. From Milan he travelled to Genoa, where he had lessons from Pieter de Molijn, a member of the Bentvueghels with the nickname Tempeest. From there he travelled to Livorno where he worked for the Dutch Consul or local ambassador, and from there travelled to Rome.

On his arrival at Rome he met several of the artists (and Bentvueghels) of his country, who received him with kindness, particularly Abraham Genoels, Adriaen Honich, Nicolaas Piemont, Jacob Ferdinand Voet, and the engraver Cornelis Bloemaert. In their society he greatly improved himself, meeting Carlo Maratta and learning to design the fine scenery in the environs of Rome in the popular manner of Italianate landscapes. On leaving Rome he went back and forth to Naples, and only stopped in Rome on his way to Bologna, Ferrara, and Venice, where he visited Johann Carl Loth. He then passed through Milan again on the way to Modena, where his works were so admired that he became court painter to Francesco II d'Este, Duke of Modena, who gave him a yearly stipend for 8 years wherein he made decorations for his various homes and buildings. When the Duke made a pilgrimage to Loreto, Marche, Van Bunnik accompanied him there and onwards to Rome, where this being his third trip there, he allowed himself to be accepted into the Bentvueghels with the nickname keteltrom. Soon afterwards, the Duke returned to Modena and stopped traveling, so Van Bunnik requested dismissal so he could return North.

The Duke gave him a pass to travel unhindered through France to his homeland, which he did, but in Turin he met Jacob Ferdinand Voet, whom he had earlier met in Rome in the company of Cornelis Bloemaert. From Turin they set out together for Lyon, where they met Adriaen van der Cabel, Peter van Bloemen, and Gillis Weenix. They set off for Paris in the company of Jan's brother Jacob van Bunnik who was a good painter of "bataljes" or battle scenes.

On his return to Holland he was employed by King William III, then Prince of Orange, to ornament his palace at Loo. He died in Utrecht in 1727.
