= Jacob Ferdinand Voet =

Flemish portrait painter

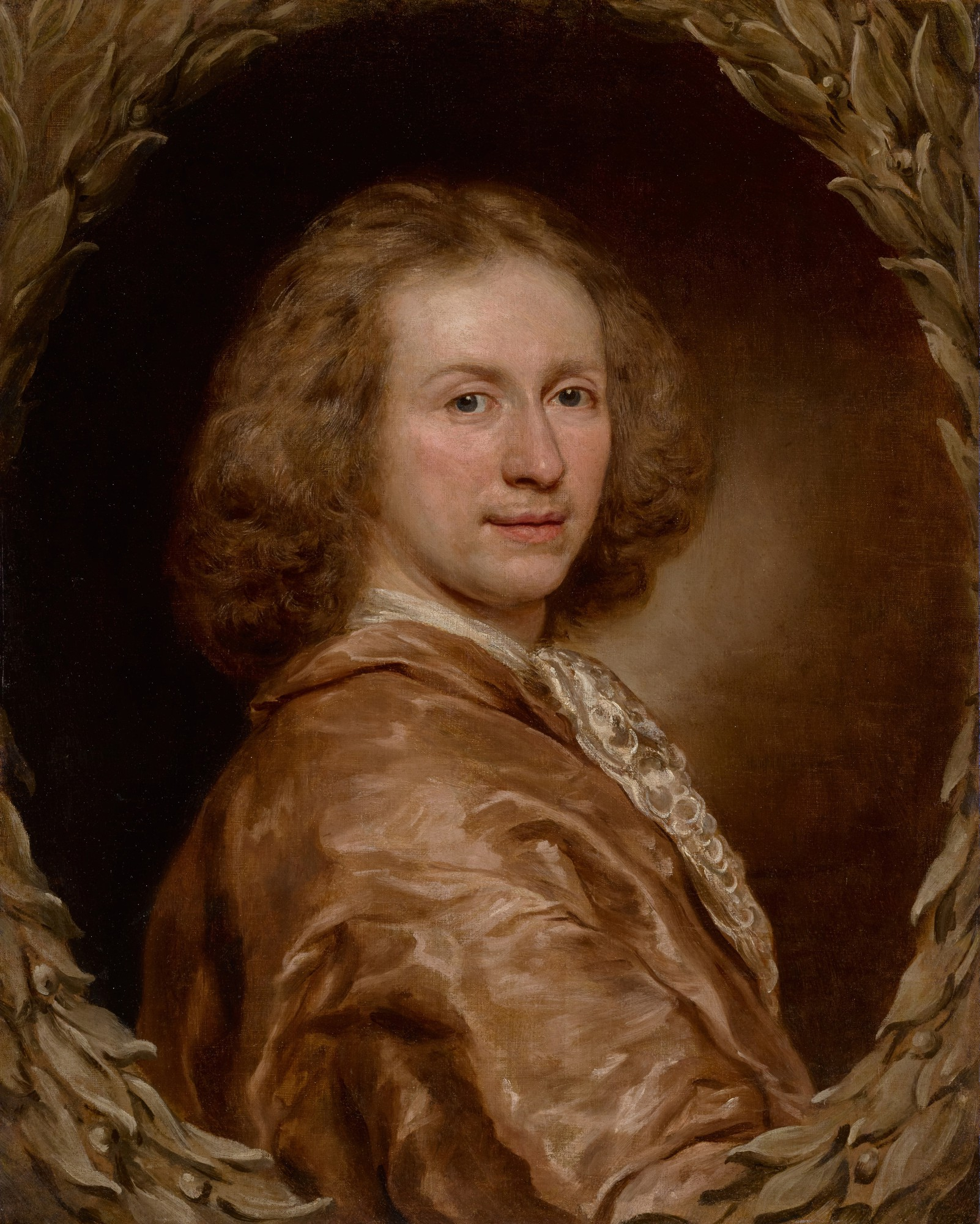
Self-portrait, 1681

Jacob Ferdinand Voet (14 March 1639 – 26 September 1689) was a Flemish portrait painter. He had an international career that brought him to Italy and France, where he made portraits for an elite clientele. Voet is regarded as one of the best and most fashionable portrait painters of the late 17th century. In the history of art, Voet was sinking into undeserved oblivion, until the 1930s.

== Life ==
Few details about Voet's early life, training and career have been preserved. Voet was born in Antwerp as the son of the Elias Voet. He was one of the fifteen children. After the death of the parents his older brothers Carel and Jan Gabriel moved to Amsterdam; Carel married a daughter of the wealthy Joan Coymans and Sophia Trip, Jan G. married a Benzi, originally from Como.

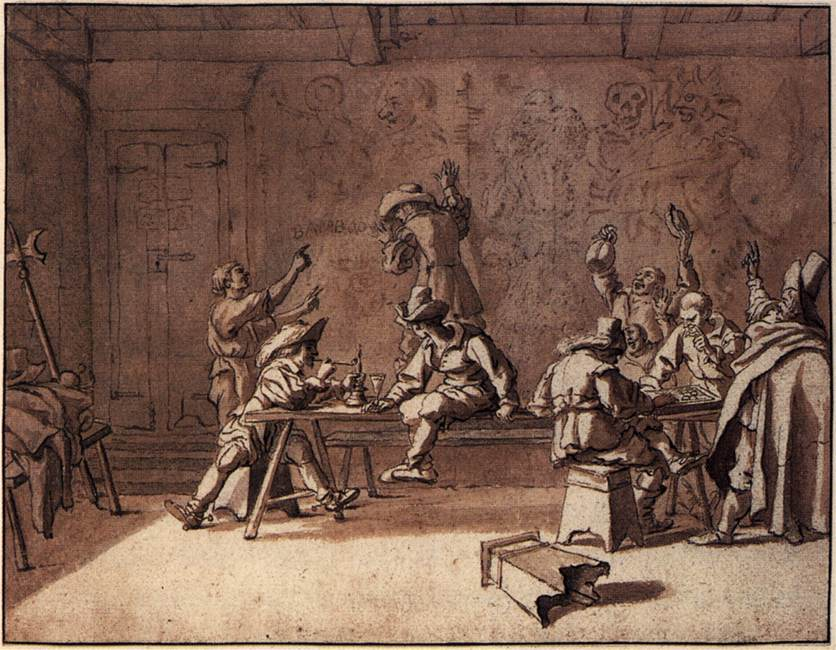
Members of the Bentvueghels in a Roman tavern, drawing by Pieter van Laer, c. 1625.

Jacob travelled to Rome where he resided from 1663 to 1680. For two years Voet shared a residence with the painter and engraver Cornelis Bloemaert near the Spanish steps. Voet became a member of the Bentvueghels, an association of mainly Dutch and Flemish artists active in Rome. Voet drew a picture in charcoal of all the members of the Bentvueghels on the white-washed wall of an inn in Rome that was a popular meeting place of this group. The picture was treasured enough to be spared whenever the walls were repainted.

In Rome, Voet's skills as a portrait painter were in great demand at the papal court and among the Roman aristocracy, including the prominent Colonna, Chigi, and Odescalchi families. He developed a highly successful portrait formula, characterized by elegant poses, fashionable Franco-Italian dress, and refined depictions of luxurious fabrics, which secured his reputation among Rome's aristocratic families. Voet, known as Monsù Ferdinando, enjoyed the patronage of Christina, Queen of Sweden, who was then resident in Rome, and painted her portrait as well as that of her close friend Cardinal Decio Azzolino. English gentlemen and other European travellers undertaking the Grand Tour also commissioned portraits from Voet.

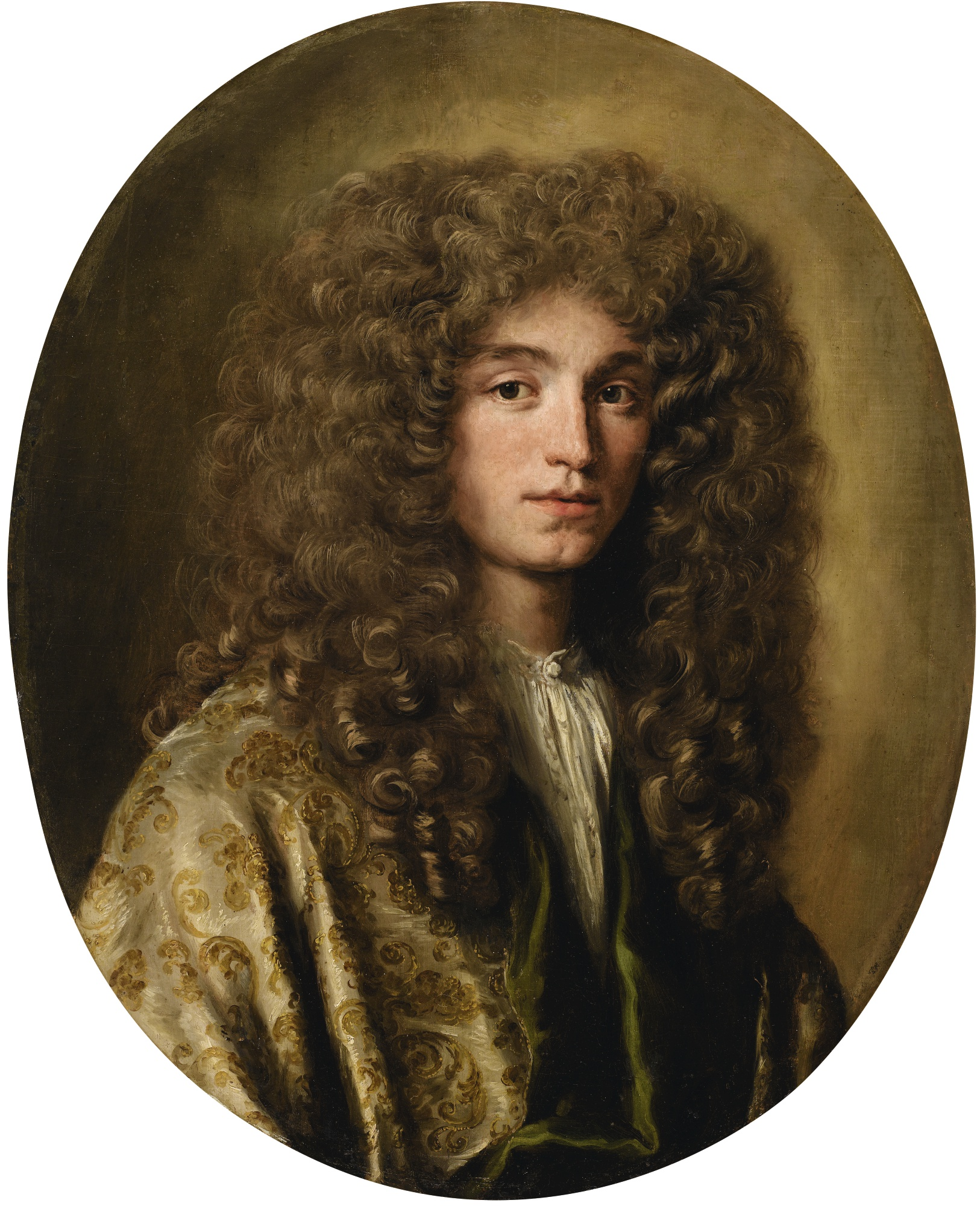
Portrait of a Man Wearing a Wig, between 1680 and 1689.

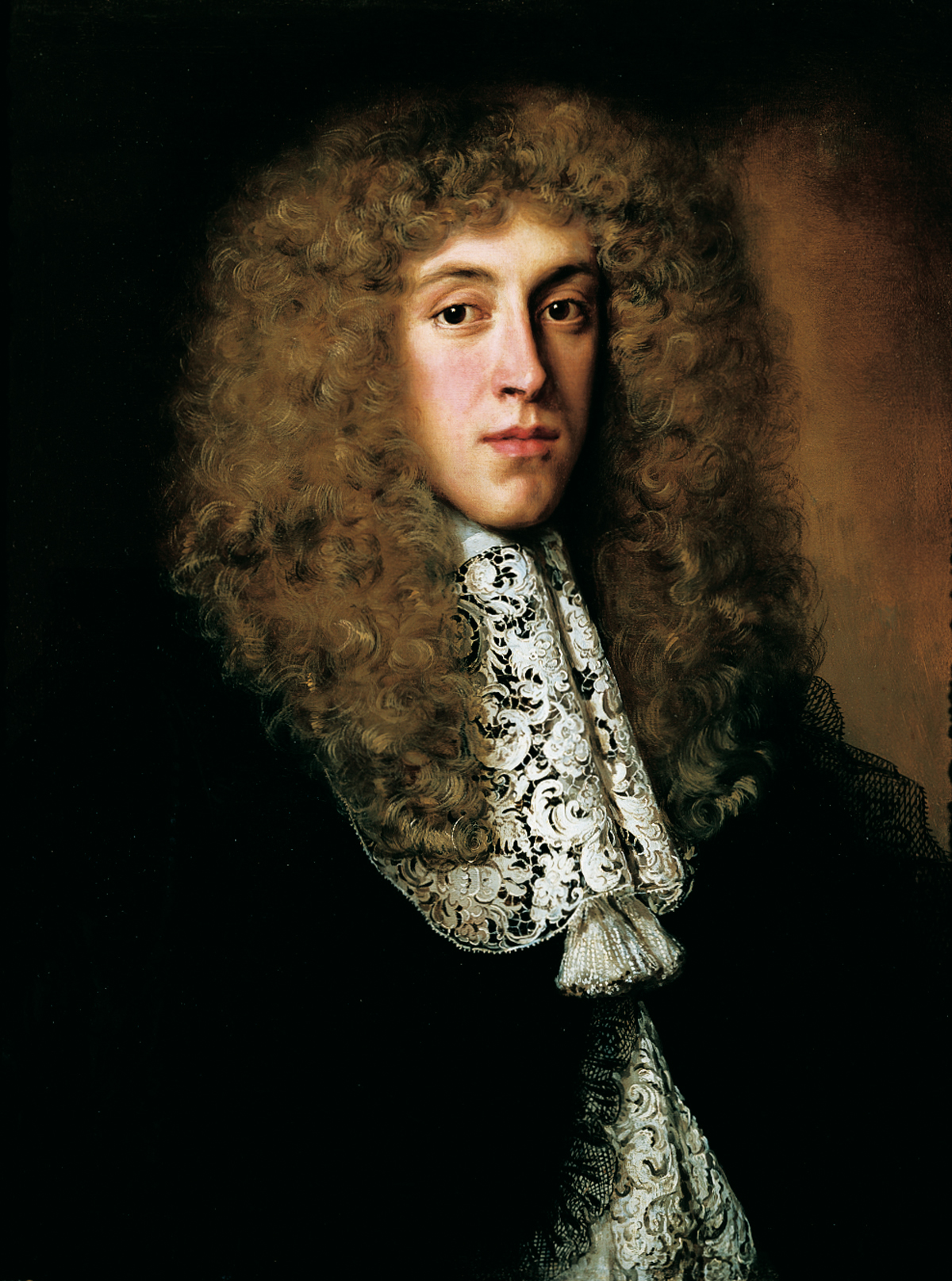
Portrait of a Gentleman with a Lace Collar, c. 1660–1670.

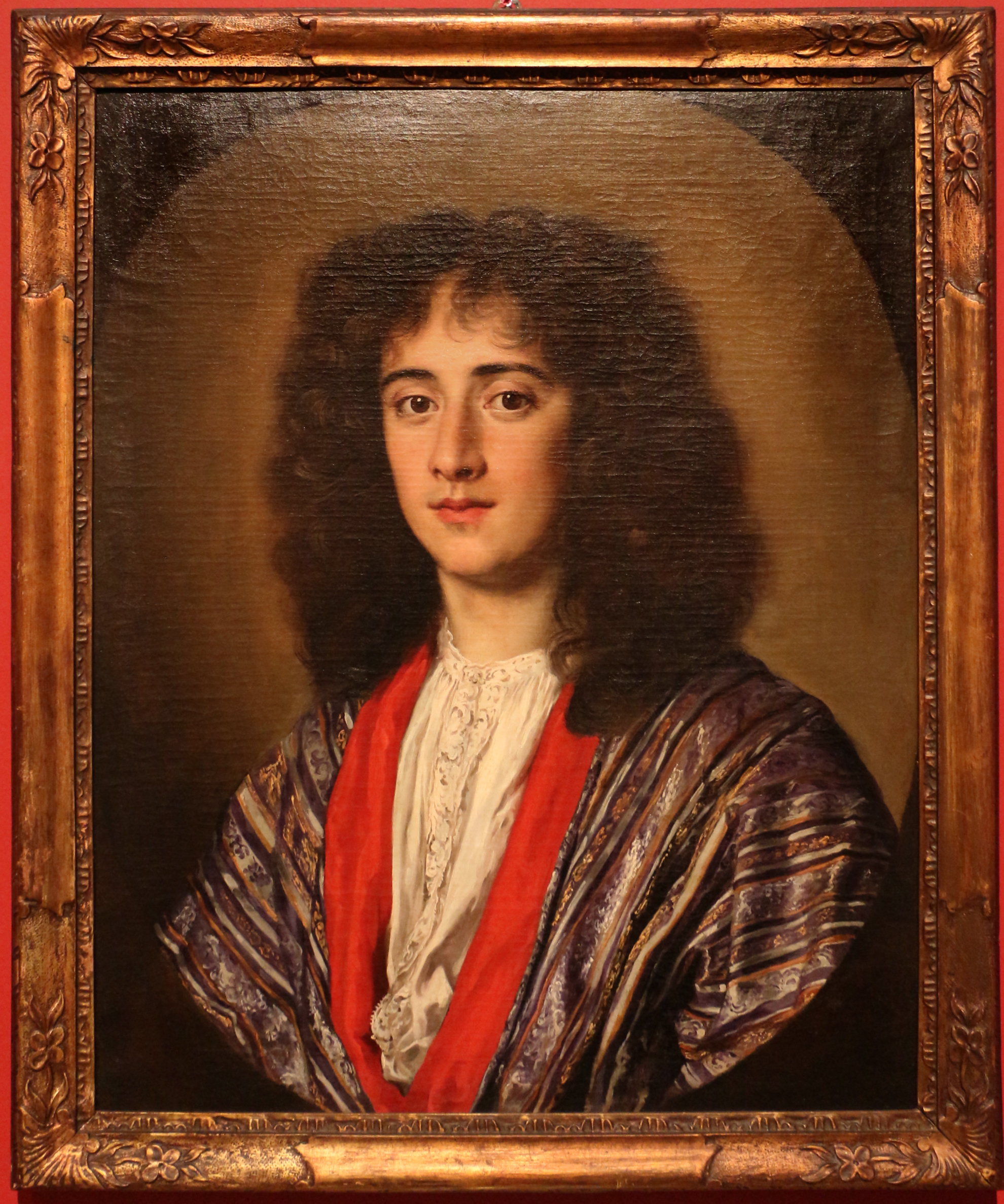
Francesco Orsini de' Cavalieri (1649–1704), 1671.

In 1671–1672 Voet received a commission from Cardinal Flavio Chigi to paint portraits of young women prominent in Roman society. Between 1672 and 1678 he completed a series of thirty-seven portraits, known as the Galleria delle Belle, for the cardinal's palace at Ariccia. The series became highly influential and was copied and expanded for other Roman and Italian noble families, helping to popularise galleries of celebrated beauties throughout Italy.

He portrayed the Florentine physician and naturalist Francesco Redi, Thomas Burnet and leading Spanish patrons and diplomats active in Italy, including Count Melgar, Cardinal Portocarrero. Among Voet's most important patrons was Gaspar Méndez de Haro, Marquess of Carpio, the Spanish ambassador in Rome and one of the foremost art collectors of the late seventeenth century. Carpio commissioned several portraits from Voet, whose works formed part of his Roman collections, while the Spanish embassy at the Palazzo di Spagna became a meeting place for artists, diplomats and intellectuals.

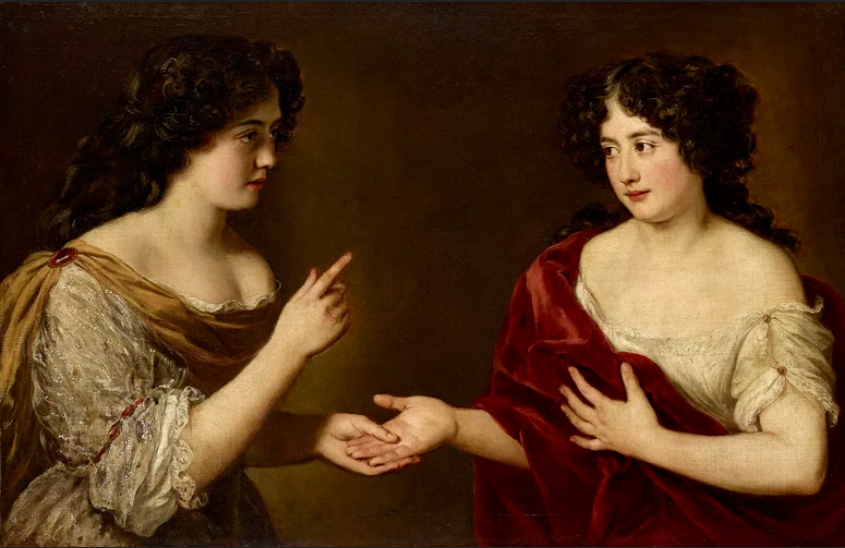
Hortense Mancini and her sister Marie, c. 1670–1680

Following the accession of Pope Innocent XI, whose stricter moral policies transformed the cultural climate in Rome, Voet left the city early 1678. Contemporary and later sources associated his departure with the pope's disapproval of his fashionable portraits of women with low-cut décolletés. Voet maintained close ties with members of the Parravicini family of Como, who were connected to the Odescalchi. These connections probably facilitated his move to Lombardy after his departure from Rome.

Voet is documented in Como and Milan in 1680, where lived near Porta Vigentina and portrayed Count Melgar, then governor of the Duchy of Milan and one of the leading Spanish officials in Italy. A letter from Francesco Maria della Porta to Livio Odescalchi also indicates that he had been invited to the court of Charles II of Spain, although it remains uncertain whether he actually travelled to Spain. In 1681 he hoped to succeed Justus Sustermans as court portraitist to the Medici in Florence, but was unsuccessful. He subsequently resided in Turin from 1682 to 1684 before returning to Antwerp.

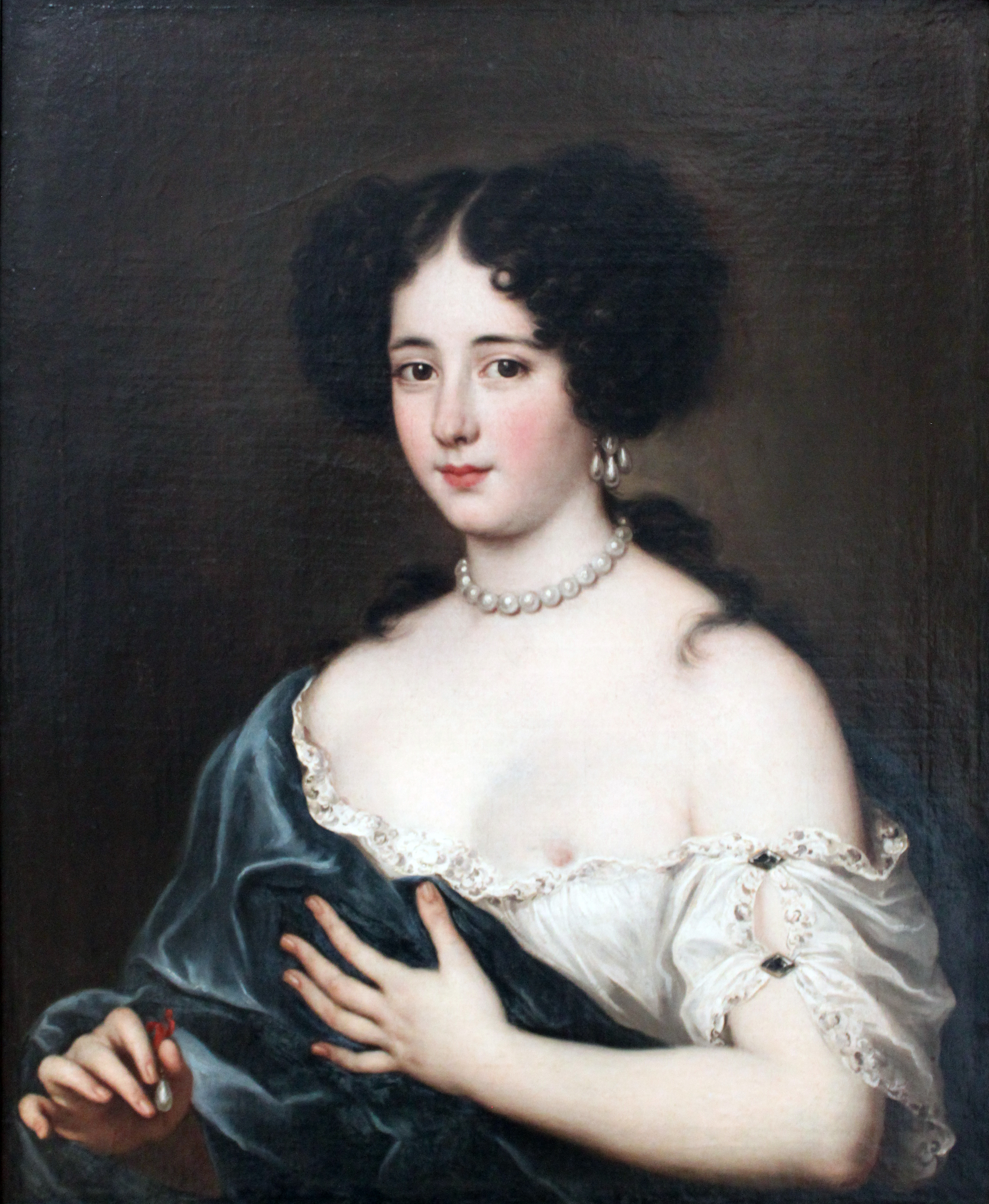
Clelia Cesarini Colonna, Duchess of Sonnino, as Cleopatra, 1675

According to the 18th-century biographer Arnold Houbraken, Voet left Turin for Antwerp together with the Dutch painter Jan van Bunnik, whom he had met in Rome through Bloemaert. They travelled via Lyons, where they met Adriaen van der Cabel, Pieter van Bloemen and Gillis Weenix, before continuing to Paris with Jacob van Bunnik, Jan's brother.

Between 1684 and 1686 he moved to Paris and contemporary Milanese notarial records later described him as "painter to the Most Christian Majesty", confirming his association with the French court. He bought a house in the Rue Guénégaud, near to Pont Neuf. In Paris he became portrait painter to political and military personalities such as Michel Le Tellier, François-Michel le Tellier and Marquis of Humières. One of his pupils was Jacques d'Agar. His nephew, a son of Jan Gabriel, took care of the inheritance after his death.

== Work ==
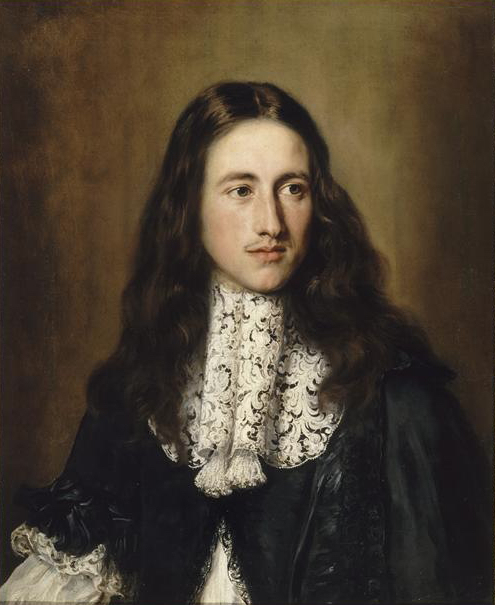
Portrait of Agustino Chigi by Jacob Ferdinand Voet (1679)

Jacob Ferdinand Voet was a specialist portrait painter. (Not a single history or landscape painting are currently attributed to him.) Voet specialized in half-length portraits, in which all attention is concentrated on the subject, who emerges from a neutral, dark background. Voet's subjects usually have a reflective expression and very striking, memorable eyes, always large and evocative. He concentrated on decorative elements such as the hair and clothing of the characters. His paintings appear to have been executed with an effortless accuracy and a fluid ease. Voet paid particular attention to the elaborate lace jabots and collars fashionable among the European aristocracy. These finely rendered textiles became a characteristic feature of many of his portraits and contributed to his reputation as a portraitist of the Roman elite. He was also noted as a painter of miniature portraits.

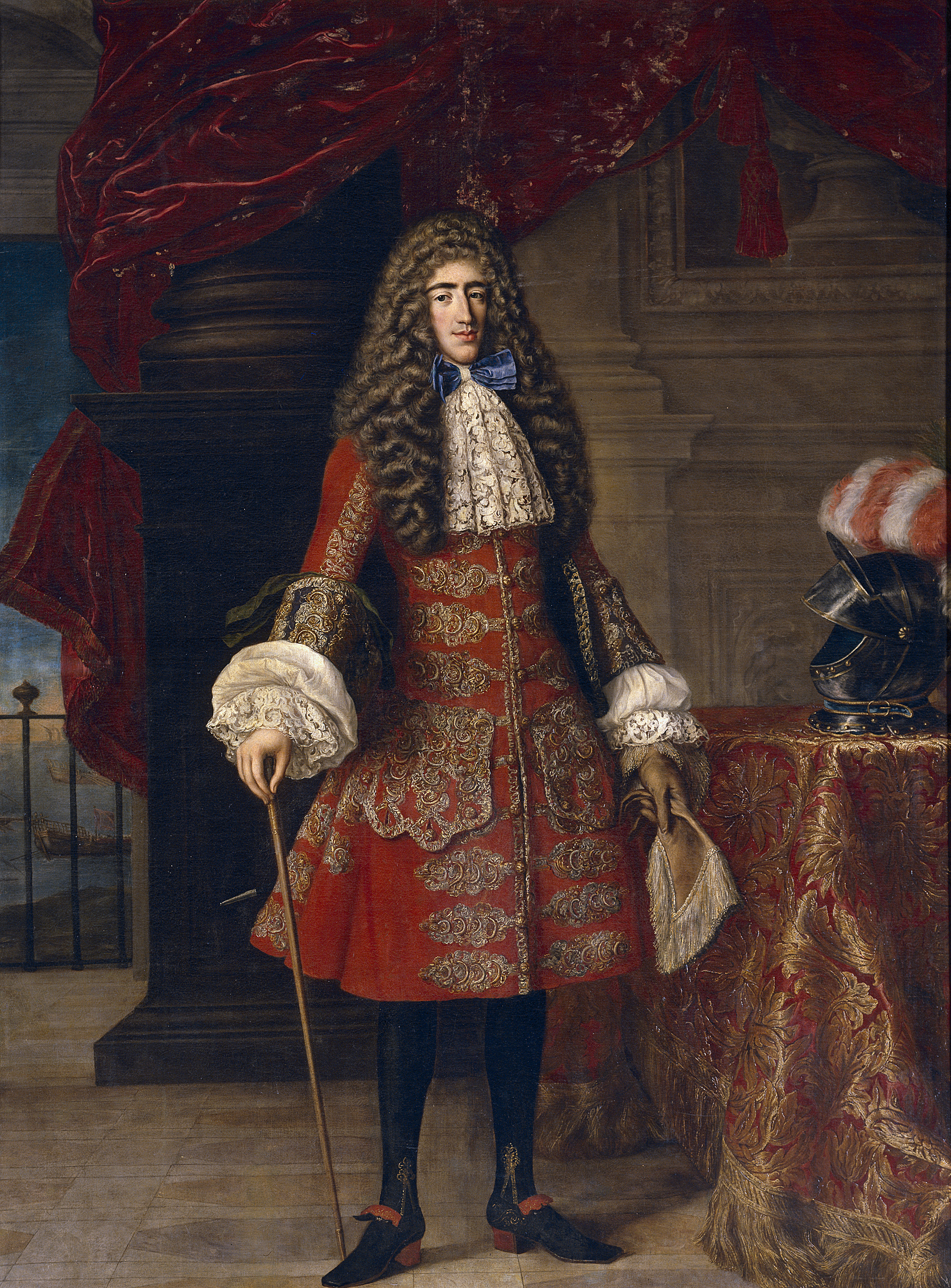
The 9th Duke of Medinaceli, c. 1684

It is likely that the works of the portrait painters Carlo Maratta (1625–1713) and Pierre Mignard (1612–1695) who were active in Rome at the same time as Voet inspired the comparable elegance of his style, which he combined with the Flemish attention to detail.

Voet (or pupils in his workshop) painted a few portraits in a genre that was popular under Catholics in Flanders at the time: the portrait in garland paintings. Garland paintings are a special type of still life developed in Antwerp by artists such as Jan Brueghel the Elder, Hendrick van Balen, Frans Francken the Younger, Peter Paul Rubens and Daniel Seghers. They typically show a flower garland around a devotional image or portrait. Garland paintings were usually collaborations between a still life and a figure painter. Close collaboration between artists with different specialities was also a common practice in Rome.

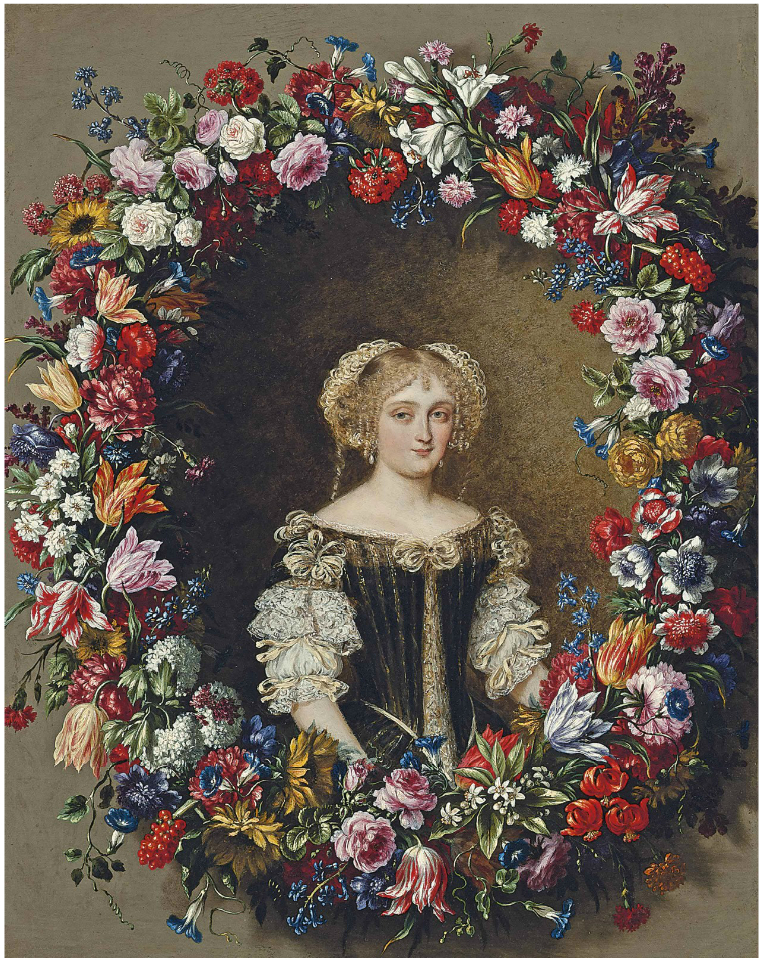
Portrait of a lady, traditionally identified as a member of the Colonna family

There are two portrait paintings attributed to Voet that use the portrait in a garland device. They are portraits of women, one in a garland of flowers, the other in a garland of fruit. The Portrait of a lady, traditionally identified as a member of the Colonna family was originally in the Colonna collection and as a result it is believed it depicts a member of the Colonna family. As in other garland paintings, the garland can be seen as carrying various symbolic connotations. The flowers allude to the sitter's beauty and youth, which are in full bloom. A branch of lilies, depicted in the upper right, refers to her chastity.

Voet's works were widely disseminated through copies by the Roman painter Pietro Veglia and engravings by the Flemish engraver Albertus Clouwet. The Roman publisher Giovanni Giacomo Rossi included Voet's portraits of many cardinals in the publication Effigies Cardinalium nunc viventum.

== Bibliography ==
- Cristina Geddo, "New Light on the Career of Jacob-Ferdinand Voet", The Burlington Magazine 143 (2001), pp. 138–144.
- Francesco Petrucci, Ferdinand Voet (1639–1689) detto Ferdinando de' Ritratti, Ugo Bozzi Editore, Roma 2005 ISBN 88-7003-039-3
- Francesco Petrucci, exhibition catalog Ferdinand Voet. Ritrattista di Corte tra Roma e l’Europa del Seicento, Roma, Castel Sant’Angelo, De Luca Editori, Roma 2005
- Francesco Petrucci, Pittura di Ritratto a Roma. Il Seicento, 3 voll., Andreina & Valneo Budai Editori, Roma 2008, ad indicem
- Francesco Petrucci, Ferdinand Voet. Ritratto di Pietro Banchieri in veste di "bella", in "Quaderni del Barocco", 6, Ariccia 2009
- Sara Ballester Baghdadi, "Jacob-Ferdinand Voet y Vincenzo Noletti en las colecciones españolas", BSAA Arte, 91 (2025), pp. 323–356.
