= Gerard Hoet =

Dutch painter

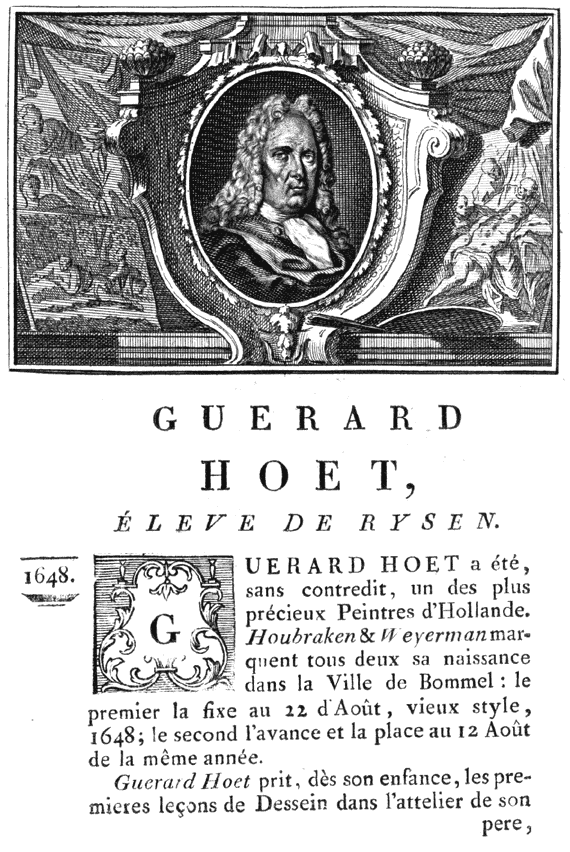
- Gerard Hoet, in artist biographies by Jean-Baptiste Descamps
- Born: 22 August 1648; Zaltbommel, Dutch Republic
- Died: 2 December 1733 (aged 85); The Hague, Dutch Republic
- Known for: Painting and engraving
- Movement: Dutch Golden Age painting

Gerard Hoet (Dutch: [ˈɣeːrɑrt ˈɦut]; 22 August 1648 – 2 December 1733) was a Dutch Golden Age painter and engraver.

== Biography ==
Gerard Hoet trained with his father and brother who were glass painters, and Warnard van Rijsen, who lived in Zaltbommel, and who himself was a pupil of Cornelis van Poelenburgh in Utrecht. In 1672 Hoet moved to The Hague, but when the Count of Salis bought paintings at his mother's house in Zaltbommel, Hoet returned to paint for him.

=== Traveling in Europe ===
Hoet accompanied the Count of Salis to Rees, Germany, where he met the Utrecht painters Jan van Bunnik, Justus Nieuwpoort and Andries de Wit. Hoet returned to Utrecht with De Wit, where he worked for Frederick Nassau de Zuylestein briefly before visiting the Hague and Amsterdam. He then traveled to France on the promise from a Marquis who wanted to give him a commission, but this promise falling through, he made some engravings of paintings by Francisque Millet.

He then wanted to travel to England, but having written to his compatriot Lucas Vorsterman, he received word that there was more work to be had in Paris. Hoet traveled to Paris where he spent more than a year, before returning to the Netherlands via Brussels. In Brussels he met the painter Adriaen Frans Boudewyns, who convinced him to stay awhile. After eight months, Hoet returned to Utrecht, where he worked for William Nassau de Zuylestein, 1st Earl of Rochford. He married and settled in Heemstede, where he found work for the lord of the castle there.

=== Utrecht drawing academy ===
Together with the painter Hendrik Schoock, in 1697 he asked the Utrecht city council for permission to found a drawing academy, which was granted. During this period he painted decorations in leading homes of gentlemen in the Utrecht area, most notably the castles of Slangenborg and Voorst near Zutphen, the latter of which he painted for Arnold van Keppel, 1st Earl of Albemarle.

=== Later years ===
In 1715 he returned to The Hague, where he spent the rest of his life. He had a business as an art dealer in collaboration with the Flemish painter Jacques Ignatius de Roore who resided in The Hague.

He taught his sons Hendrik Jacob and Gerard, as well as Nicolaes van Ravesteyn (II). His son Gerard Hoet II was an amateur painter and art collector who lived on the Lange Voorhout 62.

== Source for Houbraken ==
Hoet was a source for Houbraken, specifically for his list of the Bentvueghels painters. He wrote a set of additions to Johan van Gool's sequel to Houbraken's "Schouburg", insisting that Van Gool was incorrect in many of his biographical sketches. Though Van Gool's book was published in 1650, it was probably readily available to Hoet as an ongoing project in 1719 when Houbraken died, which is why there are prints made by Jacob Houbraken to illustrate the first volume.

== Gallery ==
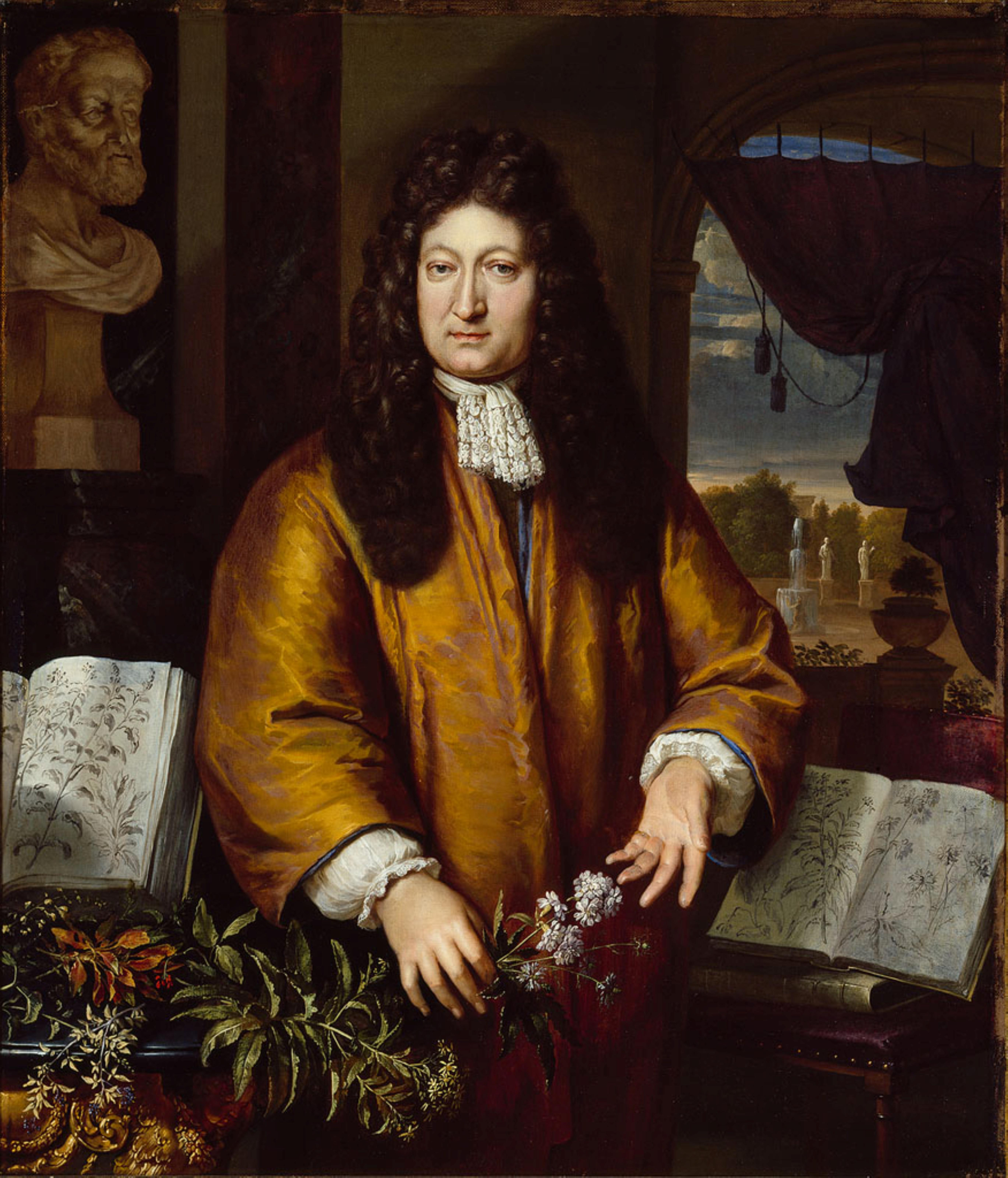
Portret van de Leidse botanicus Jan Commelin, c. 1680

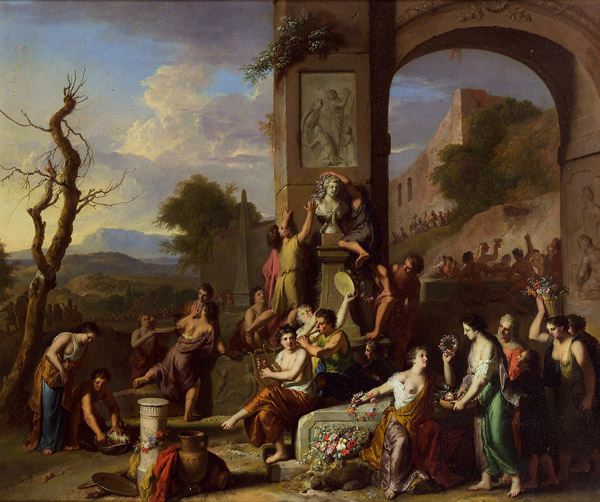
Opferfest Amongst Antique Ruins, early 1700s

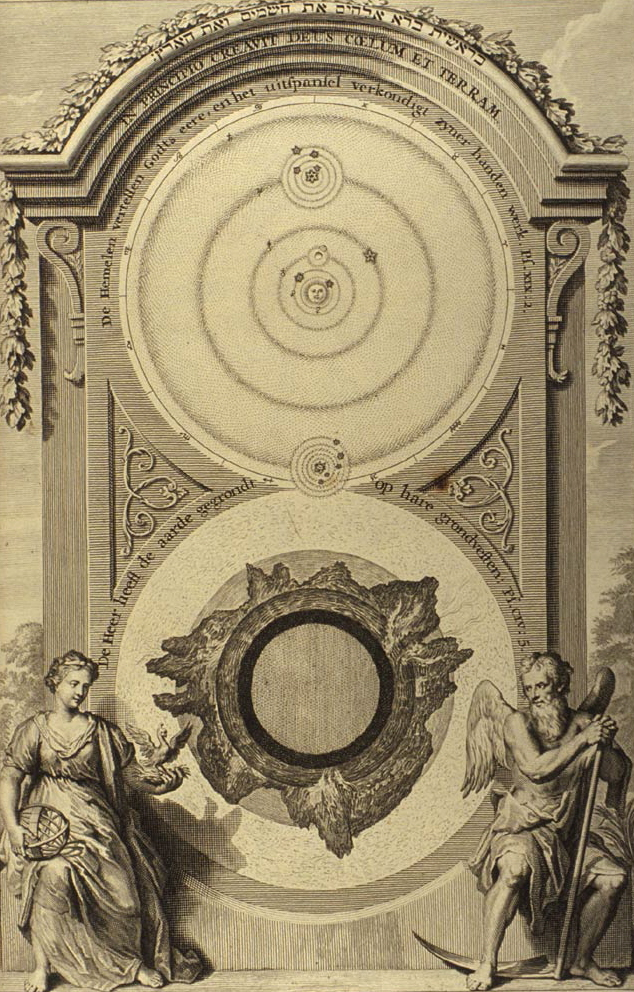
Illustration for Genesis 1:1 from the 1728 Figures de la Bible; illustrated by Gerard Hoet and others

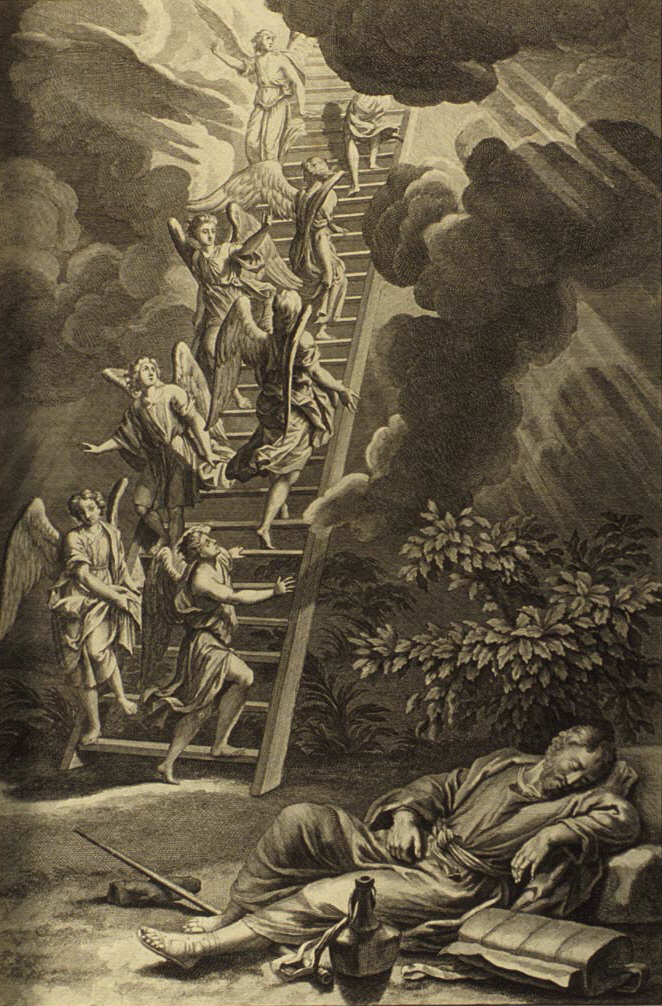
Illustration for Jacob's Ladder (Genesis 28:12) from the 1728 Figures de la Bible; illustrated by Gerard Hoet and others

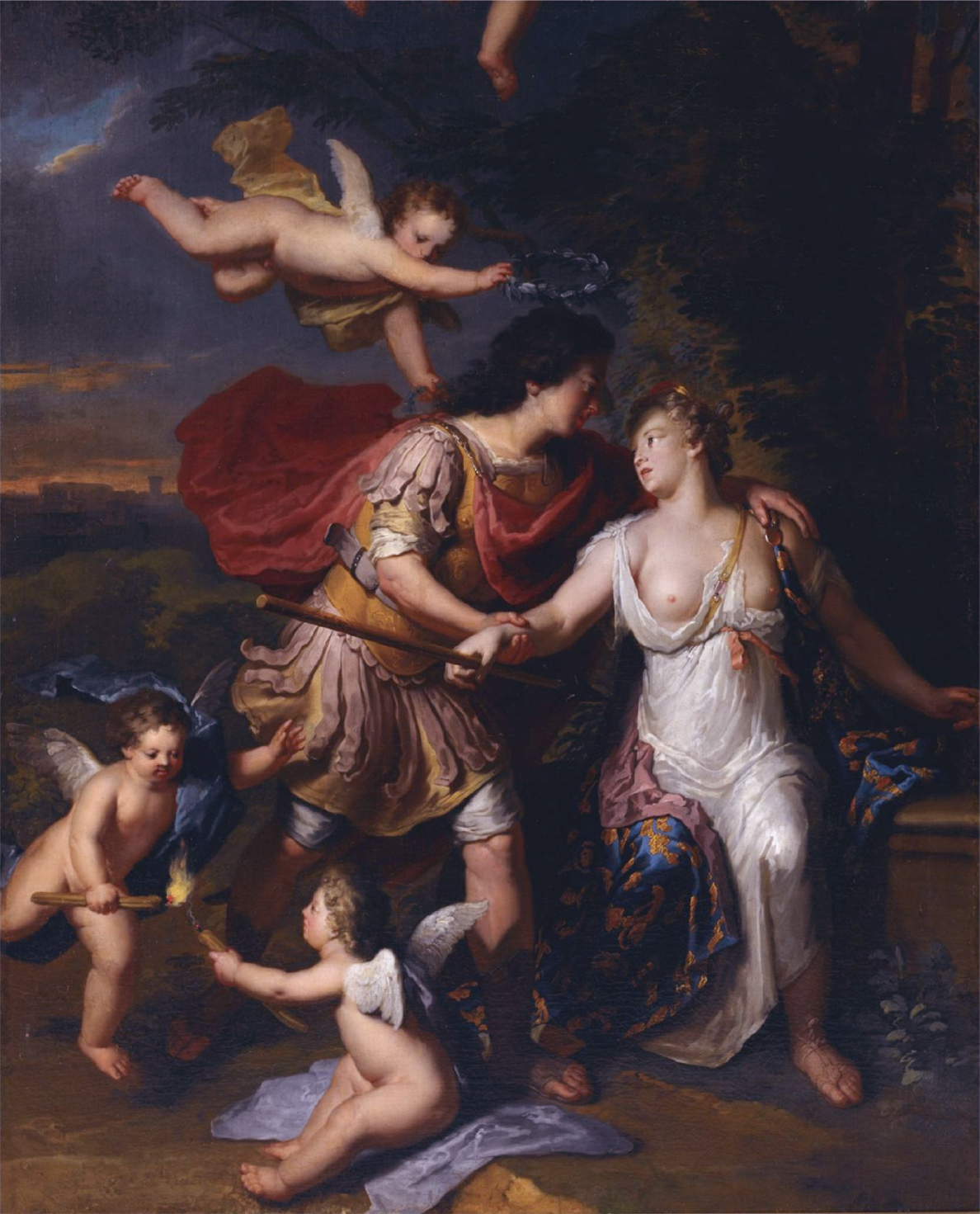
Rinaldo and Armida, based on the 1580 epic poem La Gerusalemme liberata by the Italian poet Torquato Tasso
