= Warnard van Rijsen =

Dutch Golden Age painter

Warnard van Rijsen (1625, Zaltbommel, Netherlands – 1670, Spain) was a Dutch Golden Age painter.

== Biography ==
According to Houbraken, he was a pupil of Cornelis van Poelenburch, who was born in Zaltbommel and travelled to Italy as a young man. When he returned, he set up a workshop in Zaltbommel, where he taught the painter Gerard Hoet. Houbraken, who received his information from Hoet himself, claimed he had been Hoet's teacher in Zaltbommel for a year before he moved to smaller quarters where he could no longer receive pupils at his home. In his biography of Van Poelenburch, Houbraken claimed that after teaching Hoet, he became a jeweller who travelled to Spain, where he later died.

According to the RKD, he was in Zaltbommel from 1664–1665, though it is possible that he lived there in smaller quarters for some time longer before moving to Spain. He was a contemporary and possibly a relative of the writer and goldsmith Cornelis van Rijssen.
