= Lange Voorhout 62 =

Coordinates: 52.0837°N 4.3139°E

Lange Voorhout 62, The Hague
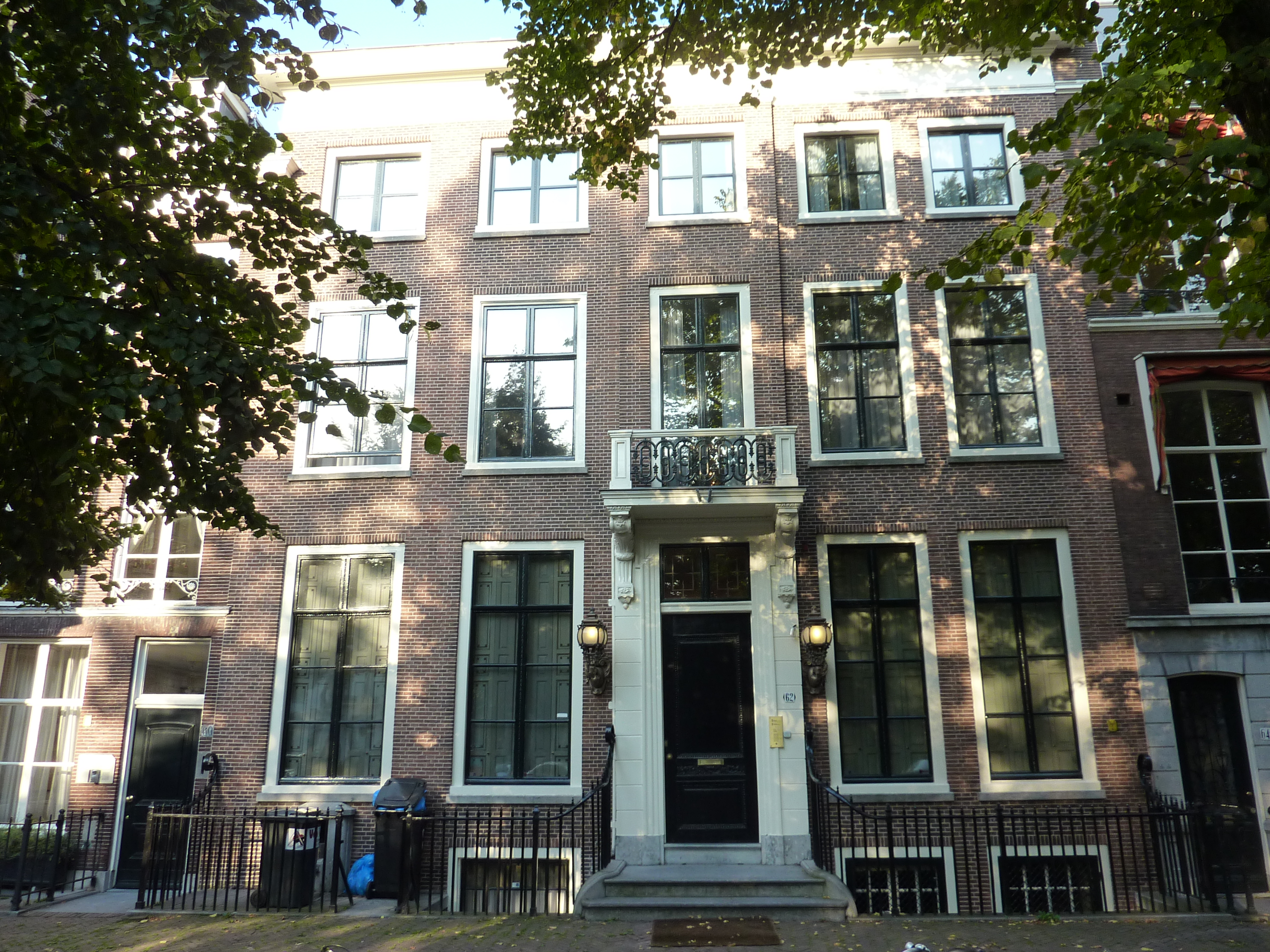
- Interactive map of the Lange Voorhout 62, The Hague area

General information
- Architectural style: Neoclassical style
- Location: The Hague, Lange Voorhout 62
- Completed: 17th century (foundation) 1776 (remodeled in Neoclassical style)

Lange Voorhout 62 is a former mansion on the Lange Voorhout in The Hague, Netherlands. The building is in use by the Statenbank.

== History ==
The building was owned by Gerard Hoet II, the son of the decorative painter Gerard Hoet. He commissioned the paintings in the salon by the Hague painter P.C. la Fargue. After he died the house was sold to Adriaan Senn van Basel, who had it remodeled in neoclassical style.
