= Jacob van Bunnik =

Dutch painter

Jacob van Bunnik (c. 1655 in Utrecht – 1725 in Utrecht), was a Dutch Golden Age painter of battle scenes and the brother of Jan van Bunnik.

According to Houbraken he accompanied his brother Jan on his travels, but he is only specifically mentioned by Houbraken when Jan was on his way back north in the company of Jacob Ferdinand Voet. From Turin they set out together for Lyon, where they met Adriaen van der Cabel, Peter van Bloemen, and Gillis Wenix. When they left Lyon for Paris, Houbraken mentions they were with Jacob, who was a good painter of ""bataljes"" or battle scenes.

On his return to Utrecht he was nominated as deacon of the Guild of St. Luke there in 1686 and 1688.
