= Hendrik Schoock =

Dutch painter (1630–1707)

Hendrik Schoock (baptised 4 May 1630, Utrecht – 24 July 1707, Utrecht), was a Dutch Golden Age painter.

== Biography ==
According to Arnold Houbraken he was a pupil of Jan Lievens and Abraham Bloemaert who later took to garland painting in the manner of Jan Davidsz. de Heem. He had already become a history painter, but encouraged by De Heem, he changed to still life painting.

According to the RKD he helped Gerard Hoet set up a drawing academy in Utrecht in 1697.

== Gallery ==
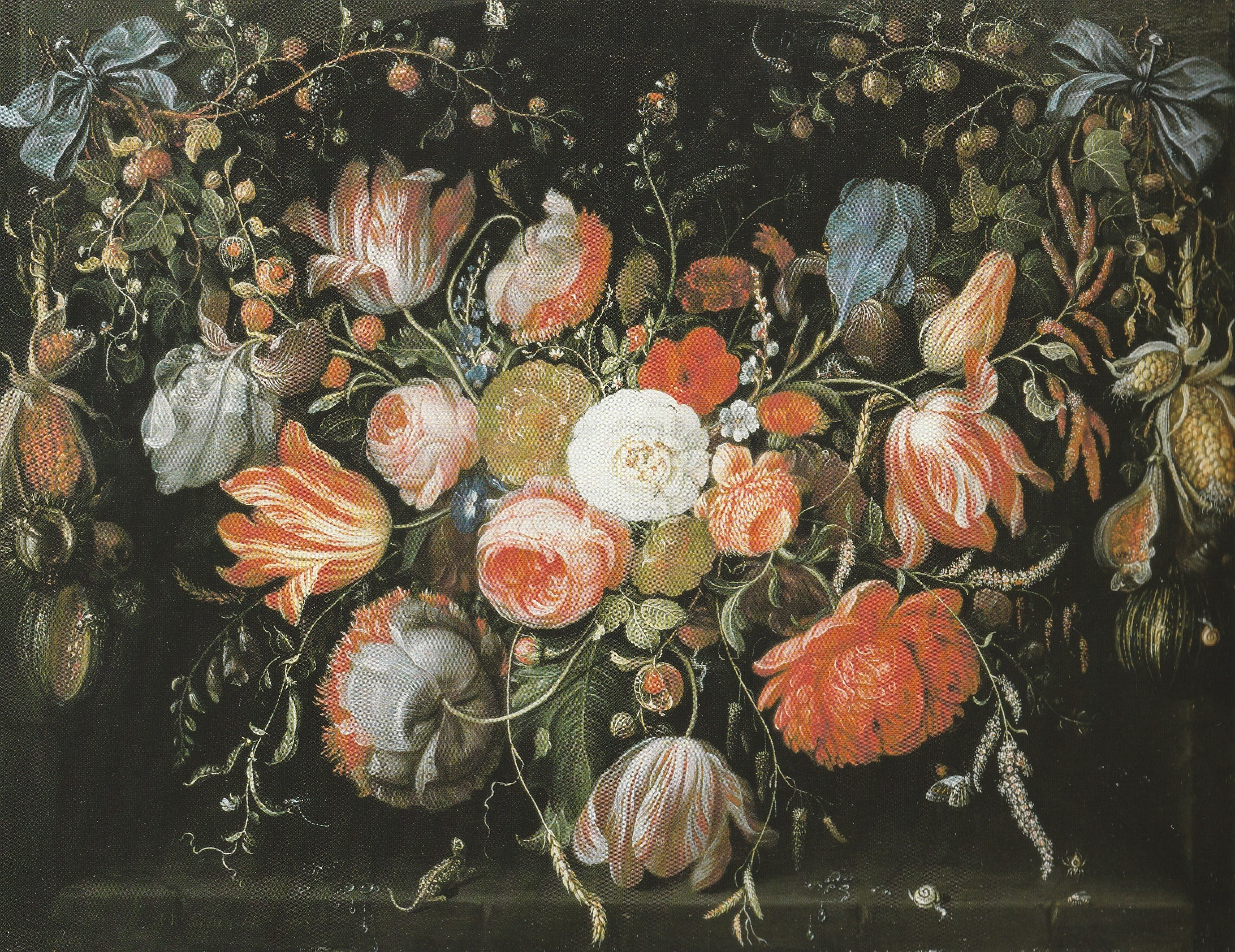
Flower garland, c. 1680, wood, 22 x 28 cm, Centraal Museum, Utrecht

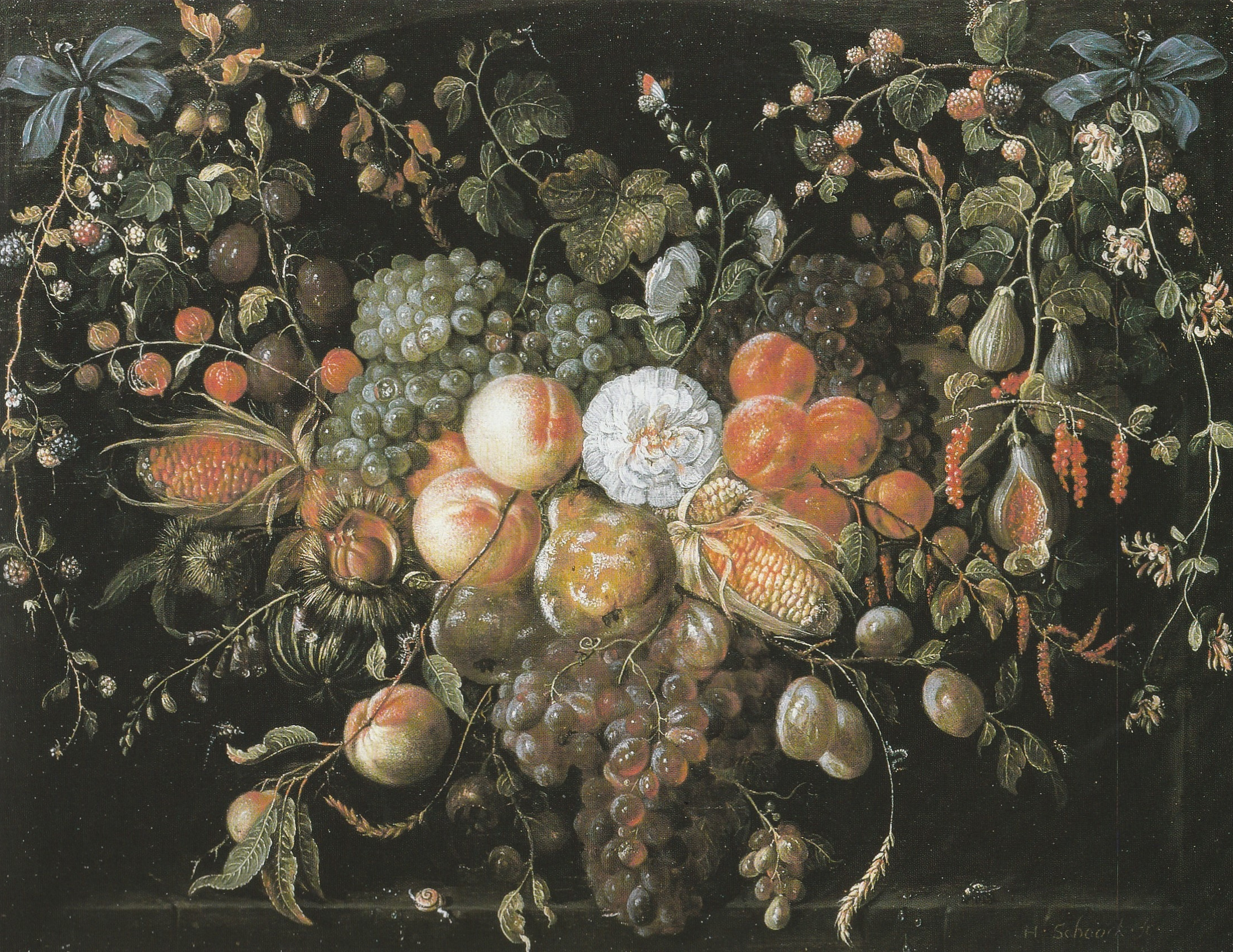
Fruit garland, c. 1680, wood, 21,5 x 27,5 cm, Centraal Museum, Utrecht
