= Cornelis van Rijssen =

- Born: 1640s Amsterdam
- Died: 1710s

Cornelis van Rijssen, or Ryssen (c.1640 – after 1708) was a goldsmith and poet of the Northern Netherlands. He was born in Amsterdam and travelled to Rome in 1667 where he became a member of the Bentvueghels with the nickname Satyr. He is known for his poems about various members of the Bentvueghels group, most notably Daniel Mijtens the Younger, whose nickname was Bontekraay and which poem Houbraken included in his Schouburg. He returned to Amsterdam in 1669 and published a book of poems in 1704. The book was popular and was reprinted in 1708 and 1719.
