= Albertus Clouwet =

Flemish engraver

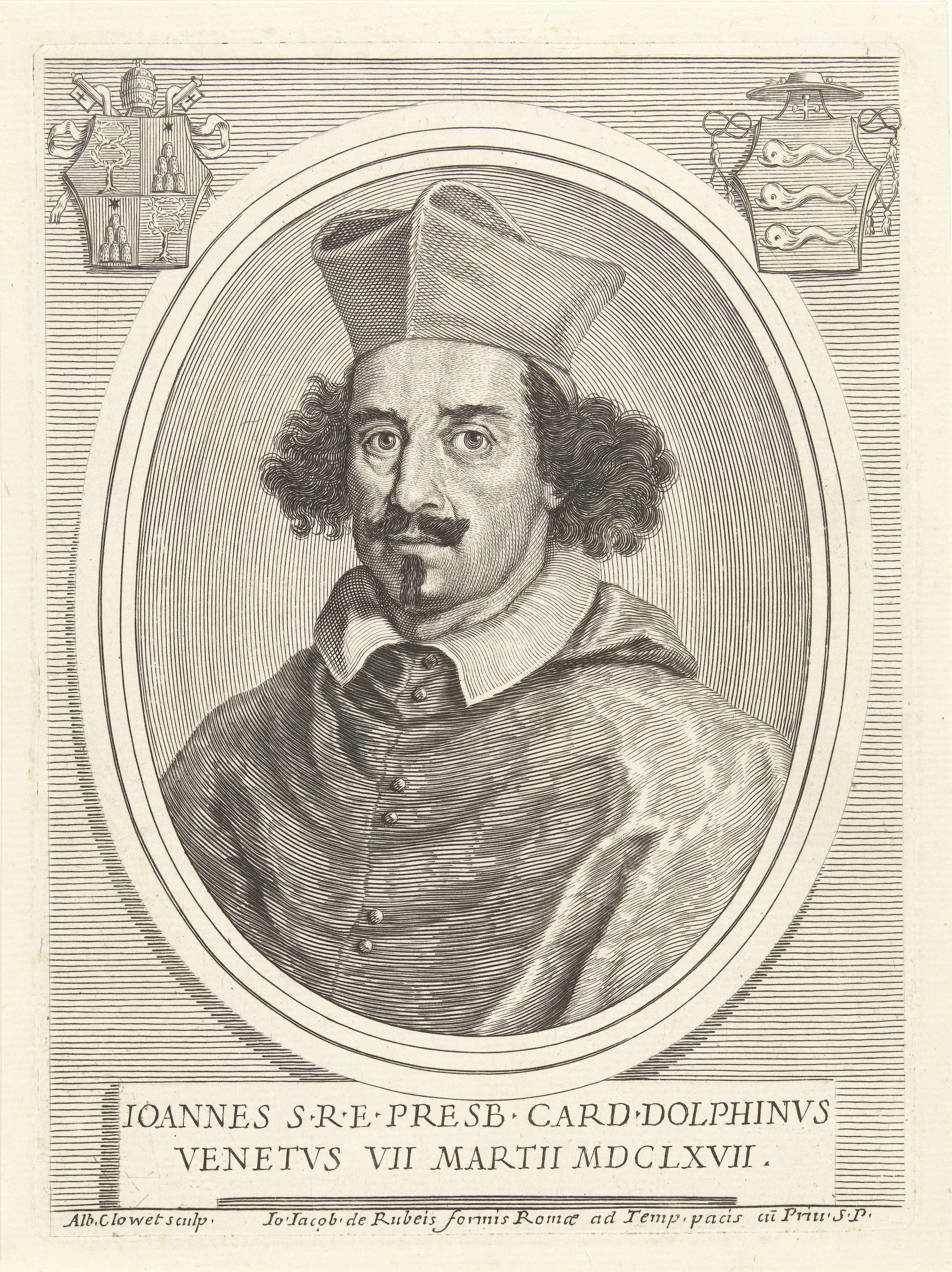
Engraved portrait of Cardinal Giovanni Dolfin, made between 1667 and 1679.

Albertus Clouwet (name variations: Albertus Clouet, Albert Clowet, Aubert Clouwet, Haubertus Clouwet, Albertus Cluet, nickname Zandzak) (1636, Antwerp – 1679, Naples), was a Flemish engraver who had a successful career in the Kingdom of Naples.

== Biography ==
He travelled to Rome and joined the bentvueghels with the bentname Zandzak. He arrived there in the company of the painter Abraham Genoels, whose party he joined en route southwards from Antwerp.

He was possibly the cousin of Peeter or Petrus Clouwet. He was a pupil of Cornelis Bloemaert in Rome and worked with him in Florence. Back in Rome in 1663 he married the German lady Lucia Fosman there. He is known as a portrait engraver.
