= Francisque Millet =

French painter and engraver (1642–1679)

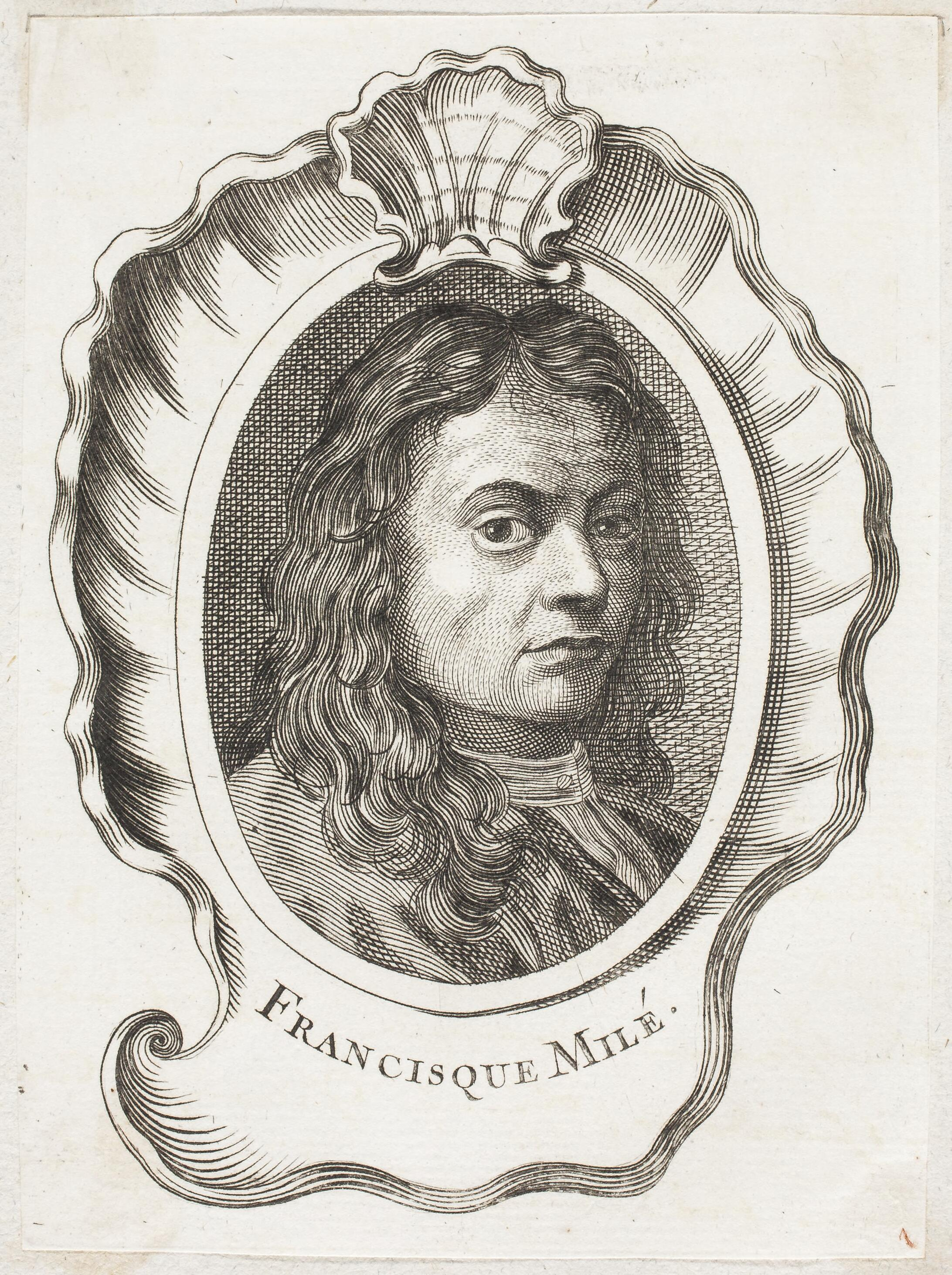
- 1762 engraving after a book illustration from 1745
- Born: Jean-François; 27 April 1642; Antwerp
- Died: 3 June 1679 (aged 37); Paris
- Known for: Painting
- Movement: Baroque

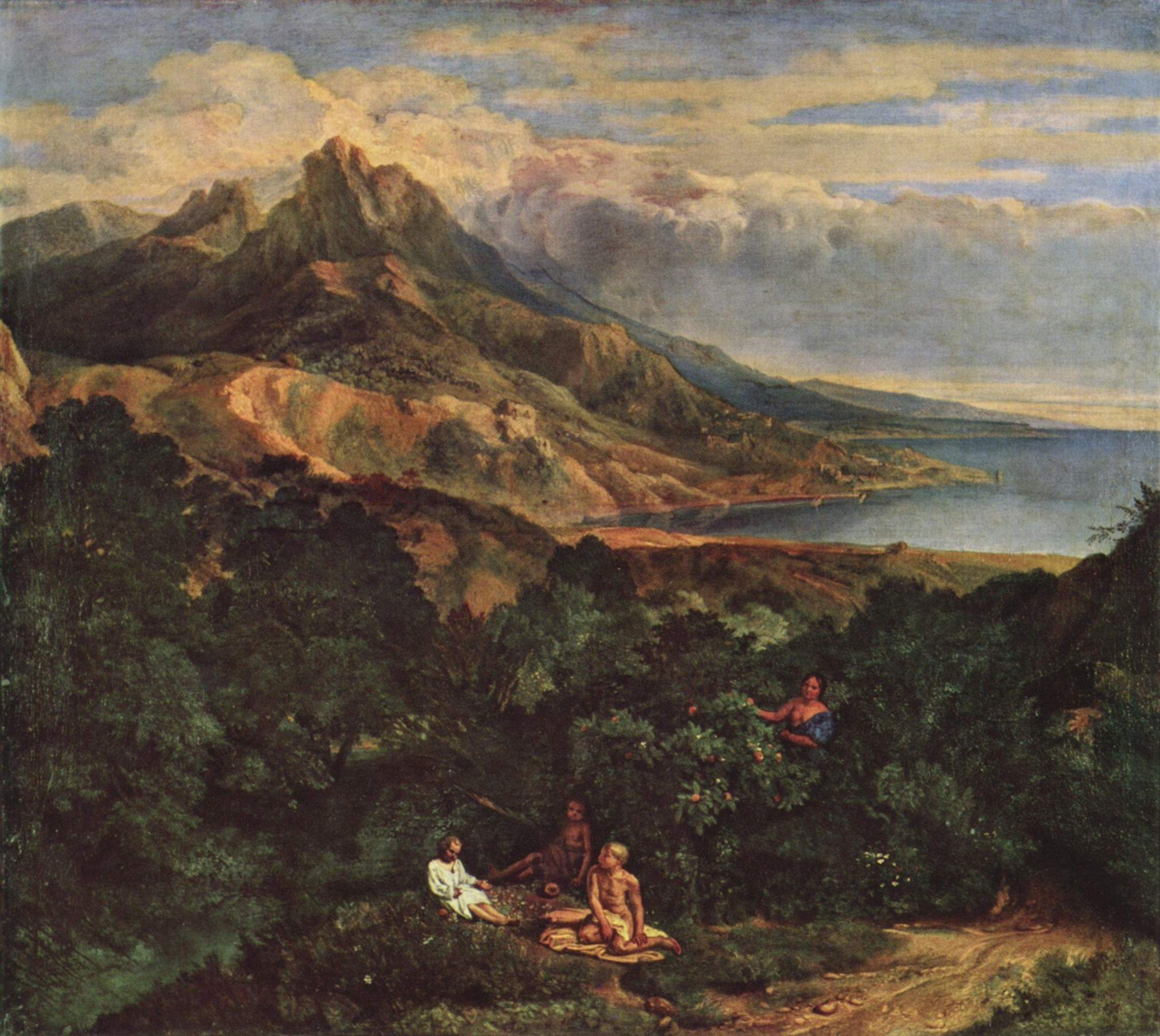
Italian landscape, Alte Pinakothek

Francisque Millet (French: [fʁɑ̃sisk milɛ]; 27 April 1642, in Antwerp – 3 June 1679, in Paris), also known as Jean-François Milée or Millet I, was a Flemish-French landscape painter of the Baroque era.

== Biography ==
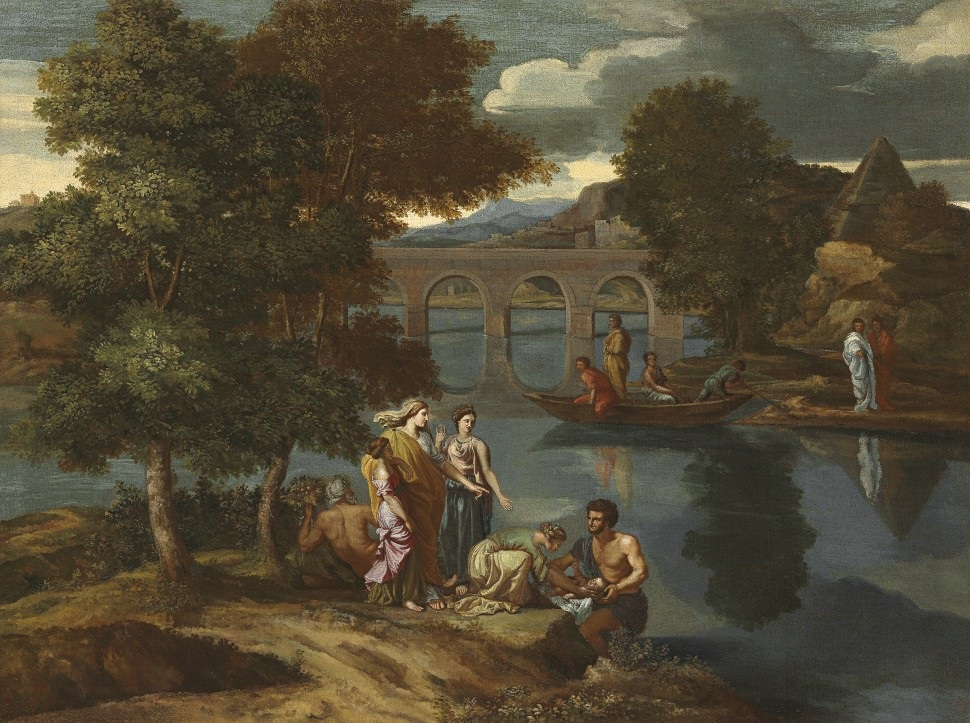
The Finding of Moses, landscape with central scene derived from a work by Nicolas Poussin

According to Houbraken, Millet was the son of a French ivory worker from Dijon, who had been tempted to move to Brabant as a result of the patronage of Louis II de Bourbon, Prince de Condé. Since he found a market for ivory work in Antwerp, he stayed there and when later his son showed a talent for drawing, he apprenticed him to Laurentius Frank, a cousin of Abraham Genoels. This Genoels wrote Houbraken that he met Millet as a boy of 17 in 1659 in Paris (Houbraken mentions that he is aware that this shows a discrepancy with Millet's recorded birth date in Antwerp by two years) where he was working with his cousin. Genoels claimed that the young Millet had a remarkable memory for detail, and could make copies of any artwork quickly and accurately without needing to turn his head towards the subject. He could thus make copies of paintings with ease. At the age of eighteen, he married his master's daughter. He specialized in Italianate landscapes with figures in the manner of Pousyn (Houbraken means the landscape painter Gaspard Dughet, Nicolas Poussin's brother-in-law). Though he enjoyed success on his travels through France, England, and Holland, he tended to spend more than he earned, a practise which Houbraken disapproved of. He suffered from a sudden high fever which caused him to go insane and died shortly thereafter at the age of 36. He was buried in the St Nicolas-des-Champs church in Paris.

== Family ==
His son, also named Jean François Millet (1666–1723), and also called Francisque, was born in Paris, and was made a member of the Academy of Painting in 1709. He consulted Watteau and other followers of the fête galante school when he wanted figures for his landscapes. The museum of Grenoble has a "Paysage" by him which is adorned with Watteau's figures.

== Legacy ==
Though Houbraken claimed that Millet had two sons who both became painters, the Dutch RKD only shows him influencing the painter Jean-François Millet (II) and Jean Coustel.

Perhaps because of the confusion between this painter and later painters with the same name, most notably Jean-François Millet, Mark Twain later wrote a farcical play called Is He Dead?, about an artist who stages his own death in order to make more money with his work.
