= Abraham Genoels =

Flemish Baroque painter, draughtsman, engraver and tapestry designer

Abraham Genoels II
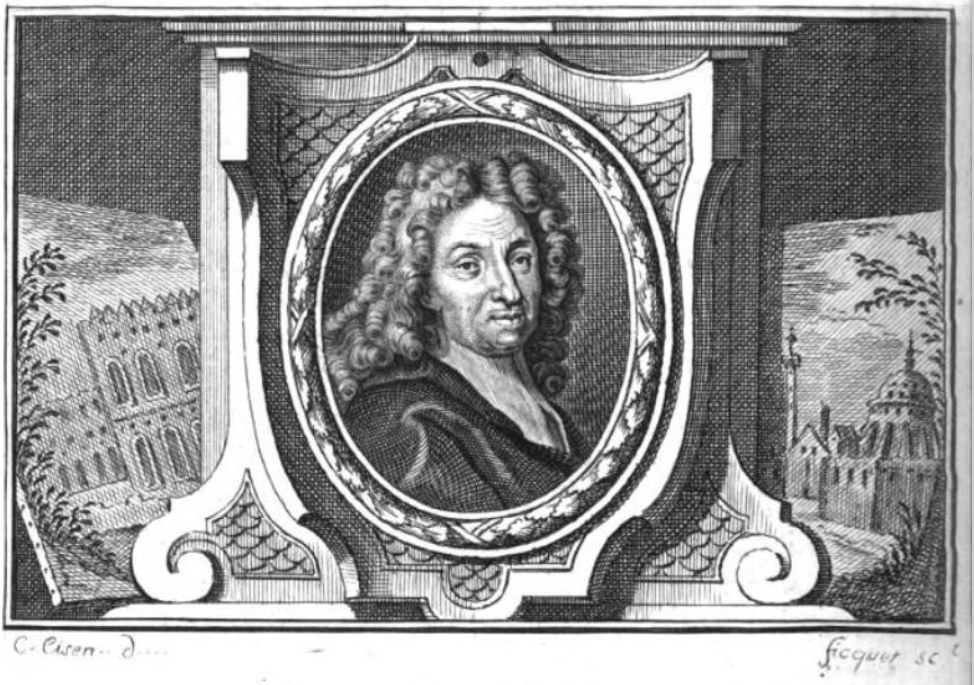
- Portrait of Abraham Genoels
- Born: 25 May 1640; Antwerp, Brabant, Spanish Netherlands
- Died: 10 May 1723 (aged 82); Antwerp, Brabant, Austrian Netherlands
- Known for: Painting
- Movement: Baroque

Abraham Genoels II or Abraham Genouil (nickname: Archimedes) (25 May 1640 – 10 May 1723) was a Flemish Baroque painter, draughtsman, engraver and tapestry designer. He is now mainly known for his landscape paintings, drawings and prints. He had an international career that saw him work in Paris, Rome and Antwerp.

== Life ==
Abraham Genoels was born on 25 May 1640 in Antwerp as the son of the starch maker Peter Genoels and Cornelia Melis. He studied from age 11 to 15 drawing under Jacques Backereel and later perspective under Nicolaes Fierlants in Antwerp. He decided to leave Antwerp as soon as he had finished his studies.

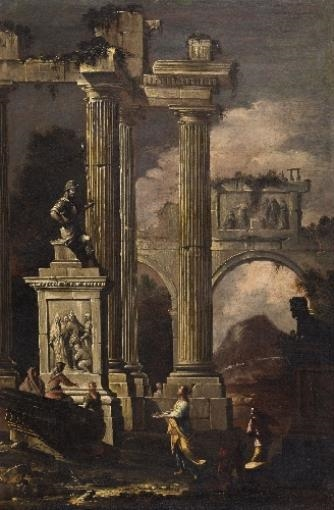
Italian landscape with ruins

In his compilation of artist biographies called the Schouwburg, the early Dutch biographer Arnold Houbraken devoted a lengthy entry of 10 pages to Genoels. Houbraken described Genoels' foreign travels. In 1659 Genoels travelled with Georg Remees to Amsterdam in order to go to Paris as war prevented them from travelling south over land. While waiting for a boat to Paris, he made a tour of all the kunstkabinetten, or art cabinets. Upon arrival in Paris (via Dieppe), he lived at the home of his cousin Laurent Francken, where he met the painter Francisque Millet who was born in Antwerp. Genoels taught perspective to Millet, 17 and an art student at the time.

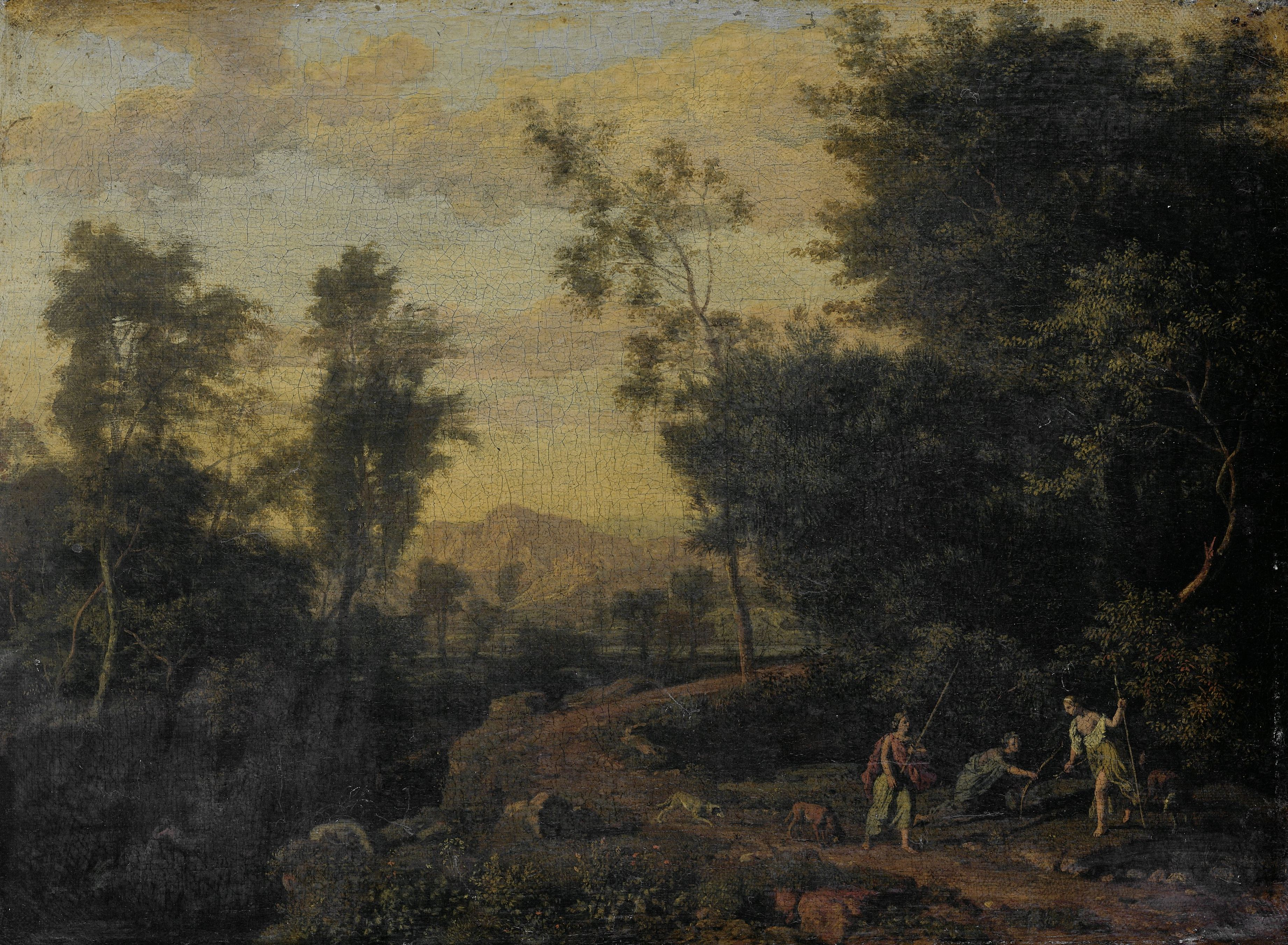
Landscape with Diana hunting

Genoels soon received a commission for tapestry designs from Gi. de la Noire Tapissier. A series of other commissions soon followed. The court painter (Premier peintre du roi) Charles Le Brun had at the time been put in charge of the Gobelins Manufactory, the royal tapestry works newly created in 1663. Le Brun had hired the Flemish battle painter Adam Frans van der Meulen to design tapestries depicting the French king's military campaigns. Adam Frans van der Meulen attracted a number of Flemish artists, including Genoels and Adriaen Frans Boudewijns, to assist him in the design of these tapestries. In 1669–70 Genoels was sent to the southern Netherlands with Boudewijns and Jan van Huchtenburg to draw three views of the chateau of Mariemont to serve as tapestry designs for the Gobelins. The accounts of the Gobelins show that the three artists also received payments for their work on designs for a series of tapestries depicting the 'Months of the Year'. Adriaen Frans Boudewijns engraved numerous works by Genoels.

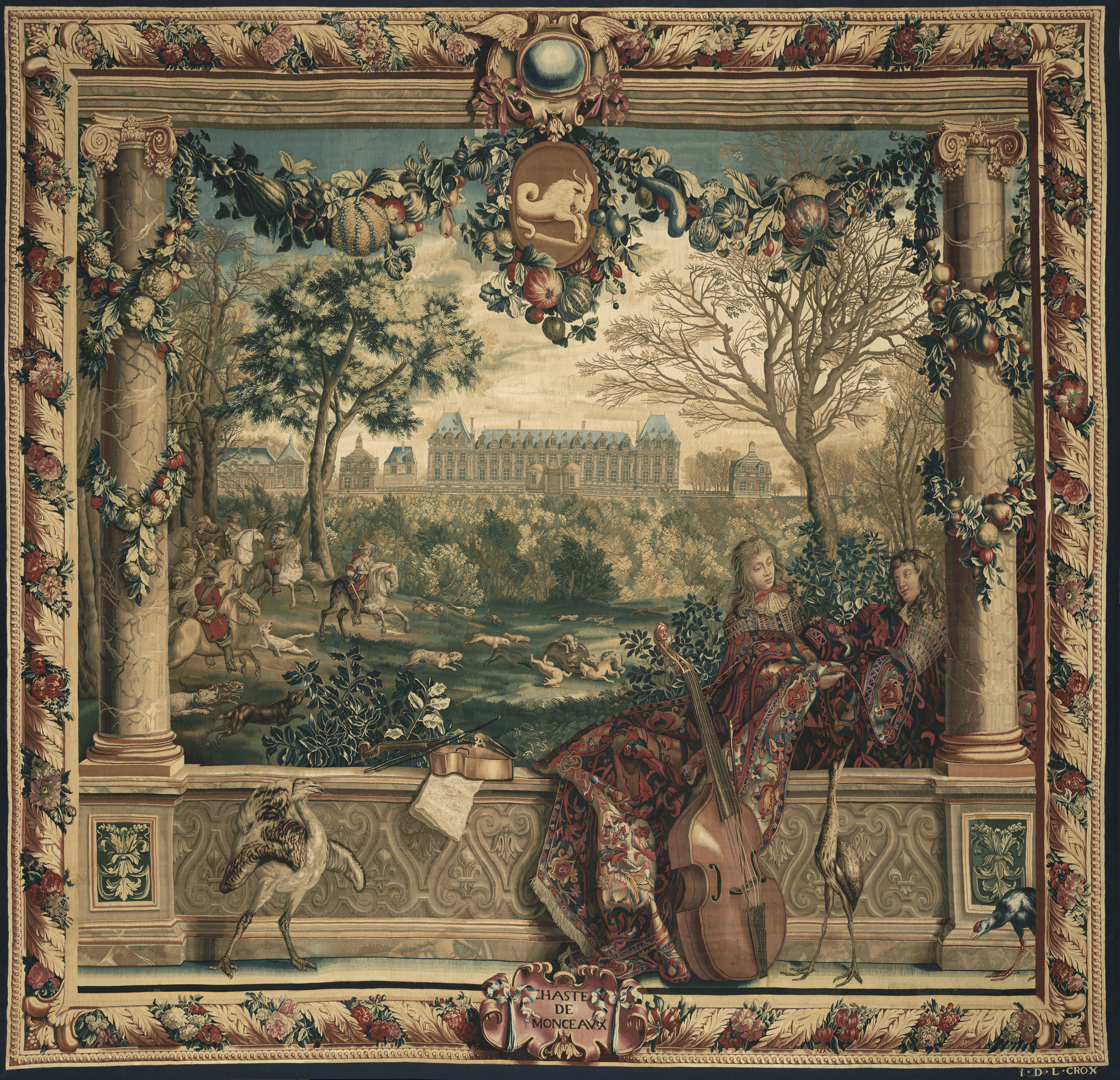
Month of December, tapestry

The engraver Gérard Audran taught him engraving while they were both working for Le Brun. Charles Le Brun nominated Genoels as a candidate member of the Académie Royale in Paris. Genoels was accepted in the Académie in 1665. He then received a house and a pension from the French king. Genoels was also paid by the king to collaborate on paintings by Charles Le Brun on the battles of Alexander the Great. Genoels worked for various leading gentlemen of Paris including François Michel Le Tellier and Louis, Grand Condé (for his Château de Chantilly), before returning to Flanders in 1669.

Genoels returned in 1669 to Antwerp where he was registered in the local Guild of St Luke 1672. He painted in 1672–73 a painting depicting Minerva and the muses in a landscape for the painters' room of the Antwerp in order to be exempted from all official duties at the Guild for 25 years.

== Travel to Italy ==
His desire to visit Rome was fulfilled in 1674 when he had earned enough money to finance this undertaking in a comfortable way. He set off with a group led by Marselis Liberechts, who had already been there and back. The other members of the group included Pieter Verbrugghen II (sculptor), Frans Moens of Middelburg, and a Canon of Liège. Further Albert Clouwet (engraver from Antwerp), Abraham van den Heuvel (merchant of Naples), and Soldanio (merchant of Venice). They left Antwerp in September 1674 for Cologne, and after 4–5 days took a boat down the Rhine to Mainz, and from there a market ship along the Rhine to Frankfurt. After a stay of 3 days they took a coach to Augsburg, and from there by horse towards Tirol, passing through Innsbruck, and over the Brenner Pass to Trento. From there they descended out of the Alps along the Brenta to Treviso, and from there went by boat to Venice. They then traveled by boat along the Po to Ferrara, and then went onwards to Bologna. After 4 days they took a horse and wagon to various small cities along the way and finally arrived in Rome.

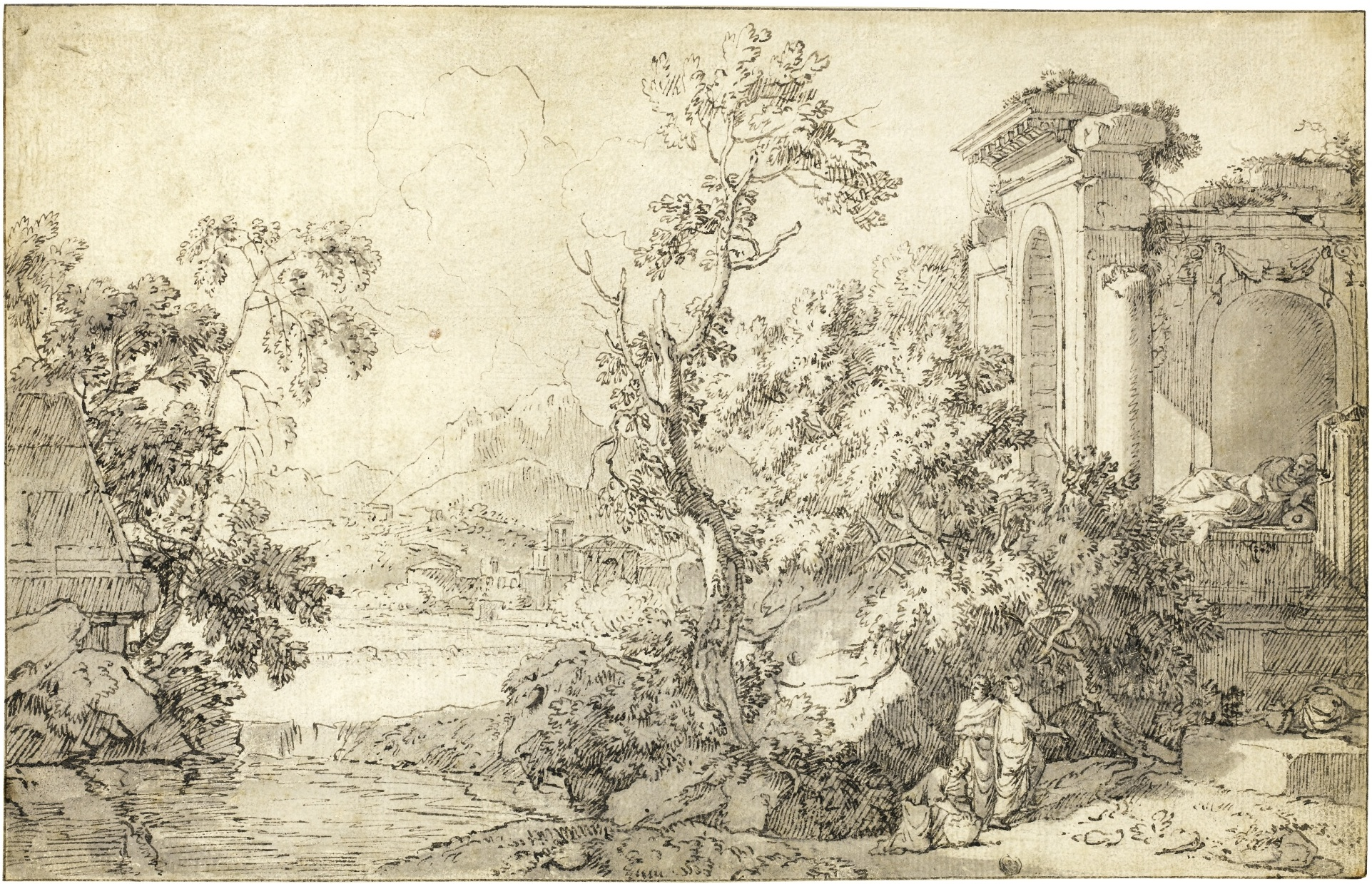
Italianate landscape with figures by ruins

He became a member of the Bentvueghels, an association of mainly Dutch and Flemish artists active in Rome. It was common practice in the Bentvueghels to give each member a nickname, the so-called "bent name". Genoels' bent name was Archimedes. This name was given him because of Genoels' skills in geometry and perspective. Genoels sent Houbraken a copy of his "Bentbrief" which was signed by the witnesses to his membership ceremony.

Genoels collaborated in Rome together with the Dutch painter Caspar van Wittel and may even have been his teacher.

== Return trip ==
In 1682 he undertook his return homewards to Antwerp. He rolled his paintings up and placed them inside clay models of antiquities and shipped these ahead. Then along with the engraver Laviron of Antwerp, and two French engravers Cavalier and Monier, he left on 25 April 1682 and travelled over Siena, Florence, Pisa, Livorno, Genoa, Nice, to Marseille, and then by mule to Avignon, and then up the Rhône to Lyons, and then up the Saône to Villefranche-sur-Saône. From there by horse over the route de Tarare over the mountains to Roanne on the Loire, and from there by boat to Orléans, and from there to Paris, where he stayed to await his shipment and see old friends. When his ship came in he made a present of a painting to Charles le Brun, and a much larger one to Colbert. After that he left by carriage to Lille, and from there to Tournai and Ghent, arriving on 8 December 1682 in Antwerp, where he still lived when he was in correspondence with Houbraken. He became a member of the Guild of St. Luke there.

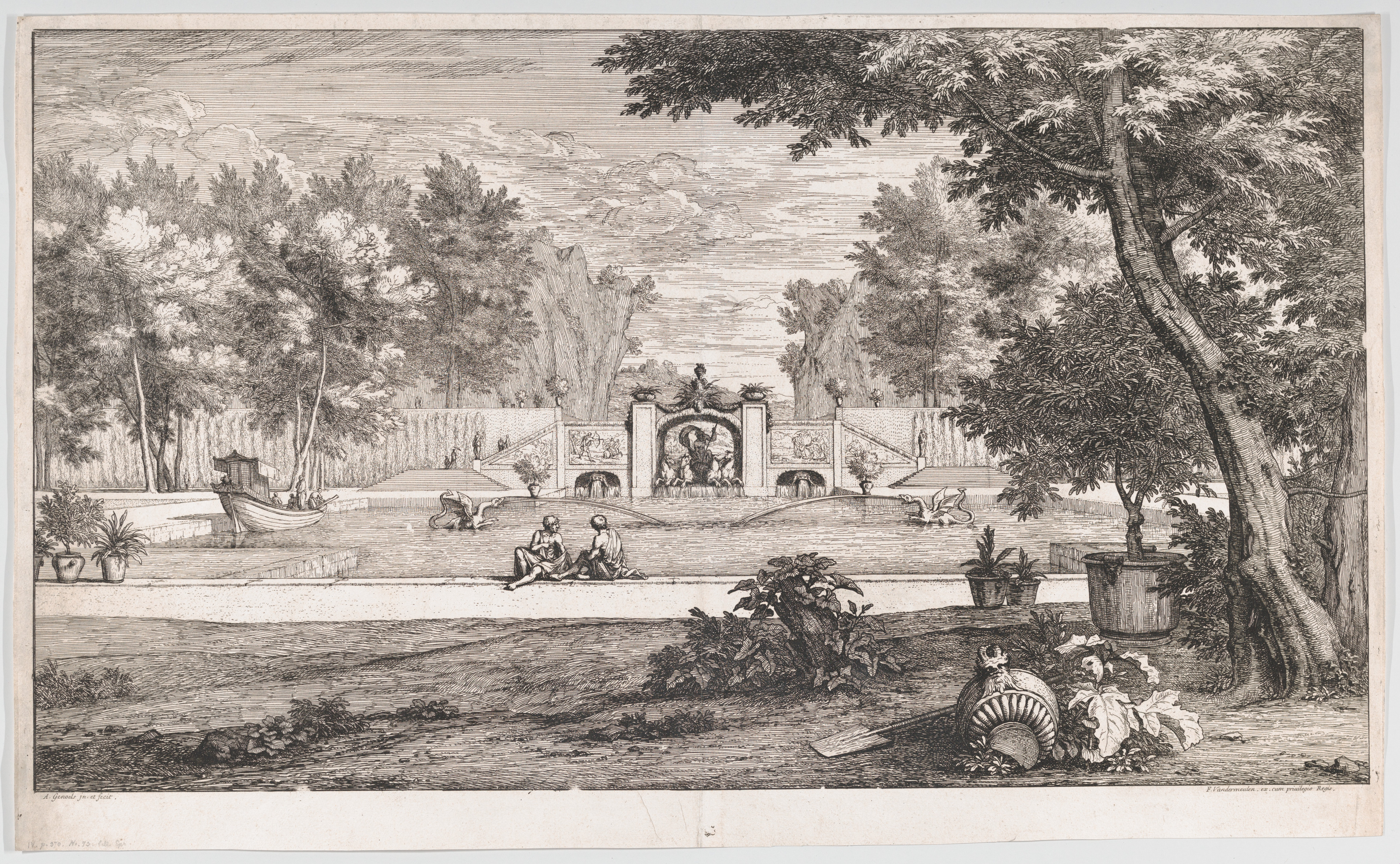
Grand garden view

He had the following pupils: Peeter Beethoven (1689–1690); Gillis Bisschop (1692–1693) and Ferdinandus Goffine (1694–1695). Genoels was very successful and died a rich man.

== Work ==
In his lifetime, the paintings of Genoels were very highly regarded but his reputation dwindled after the eighteenth century. This may be the reason why so few of his major works have survived. The surviving paintings are classically structured landscapes with mythological scenes that are classicizing in the style of Nicolas Poussin.

His landscape drawings and etchings are still highly regarded. The well-structured compositions often depict Italianate architecture and small, sketchy figures set in a rich landscape. The drawings show determination and fluidity. Genoels's etchings show a distinctly Italian influence with their landscape owing much to the Roman Campagna, including the architectural ruins that he includes. His prints depict idyllic landscapes and his designs were etched by others, such as Adriaen Frans Boudewijns. His works are in the Italianate style and contrast with the local naturalism of artists who depicted grittier northern landscapes.
