= Mayken Coecke =

(c.1545–1578) Wife of Pieter Breughel I

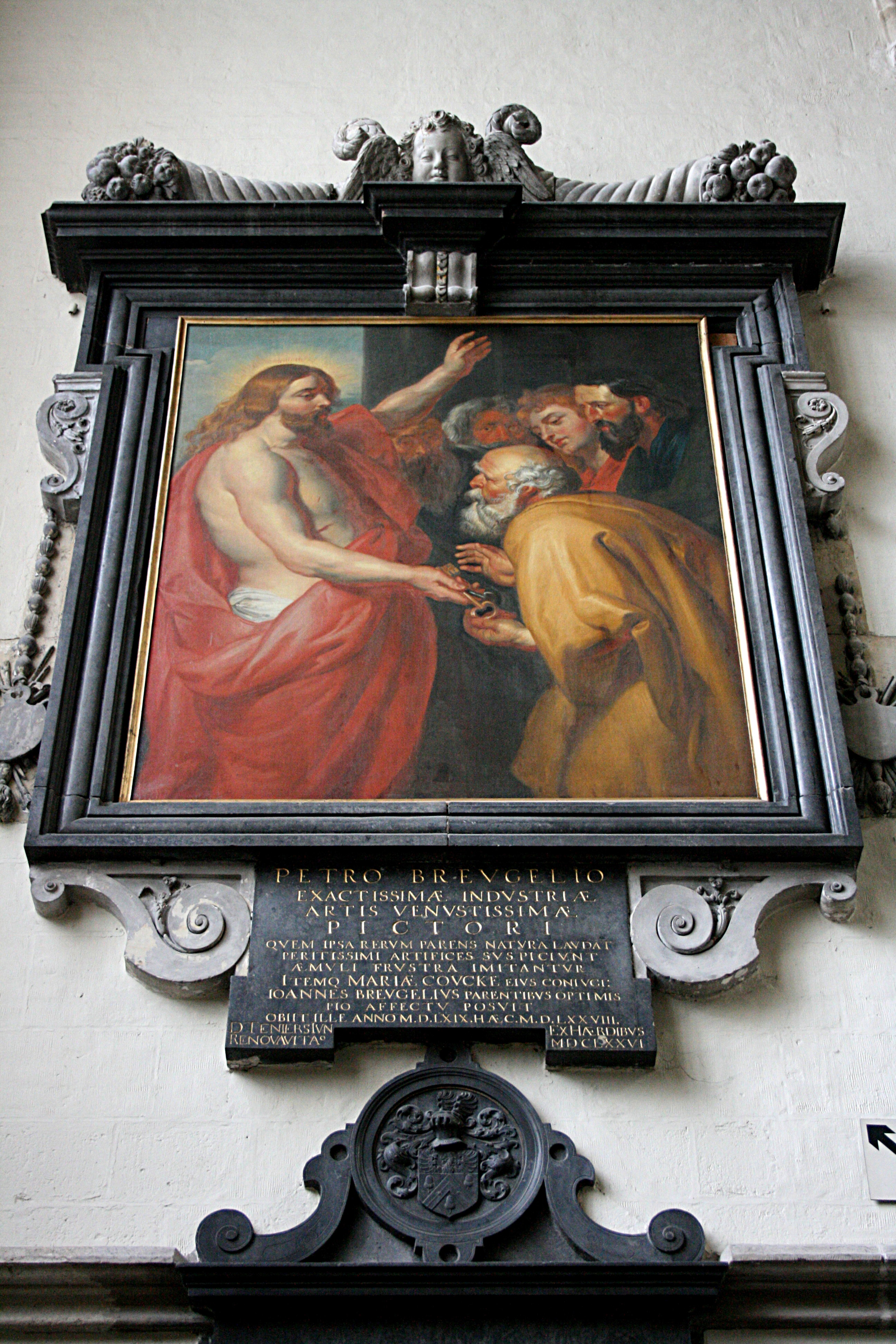
Commemorative plaque in the Chapel Church honouring Maria Coucke and her husband Pieter Bruegel the Elder. The painting Christus geeft de sleutels aan Sint Pieter was an original Peter Paul Rubens, the current work at display in the church is a copy.

Mayken Coecke or Maria Coecke (c.1545–1578) was the daughter of Pieter Coecke van Aelst and Mayken Verhulst. Mayken married Pieter Bruegel the Elder in 1563. Bruegel was apprenticed to Pieter Coecke van Aelst, a leading Antwerp artist who had relocated to Brussels.

They had three children: Pieter Brueghel the Younger (born 1564/65), Maria (born 1566) and Jan Brueghel the Elder (born 1568). Their sons later became known as "Helse Brueghel" and "Fluwelen Brueghel".

Mayken Coecke was mentioned as a painter herself in a 17th-century manuscript from Mechelen.

Mayken died in 1578. She was buried next to her husband in the Chapel Church; their son Jan Brueghel the Elder provided the church with a commemorative plaque honouring his parents.

== Notes ==
Brueghel family tree

Pieter Bruegel the Elder
Pieter Brueghel the Younger	Jan Brueghel the Elder
Ambrosius Brueghel	Jan Brueghel the Younger	Anna Brueghel x David Teniers the Younger	Paschasia Brueghel	Hieronymous van Kessel the Younger
Jan Pieter Brueghel	Abraham Brueghel	Jan Baptist Brueghel	Jan van Kessel the Elder
