= Brueghel =

Brueghel, Bruegel or Van Breugel (Dutch pronunciation: [ˈbrøːɣəl]) was the name of several Dutch/Flemish painters from the Brueghel family:

- Pieter Bruegel the Elder (c. 1525–1569), the most famous member of the family and the only one to sign his paintings as "Bruegel" without the H
- Pieter Brueghel the Younger (1564–1638)
- Jan Brueghel the Elder (1568–1625)
- Jan Brueghel the Younger (1601–1678)
- Albert van Breugel
- Ambrosius Brueghel (1617–1675)
- Anna Brueghel (1620–1656), Brabant painter
- Jan Pieter Brueghel (1628–1664)
- Abraham Brueghel (1631–1690)
- Jan Baptist Brueghel (1647–1719)
- Carline van Breugel (born 1994), Dutch politician

Bruegel may also refer to:

- 9664 Brueghel, outer main-belt asteroid
- Bruegel (crater), on Mercury
- Breugel, Netherlands, a village in the municipality of Son en Breugel
- Bruegel (think tank), European economic think tank with offices in Brussels

Others

- Brueghel's syndrome
