= Philips Brueghel =

Flemish painter and printmaker

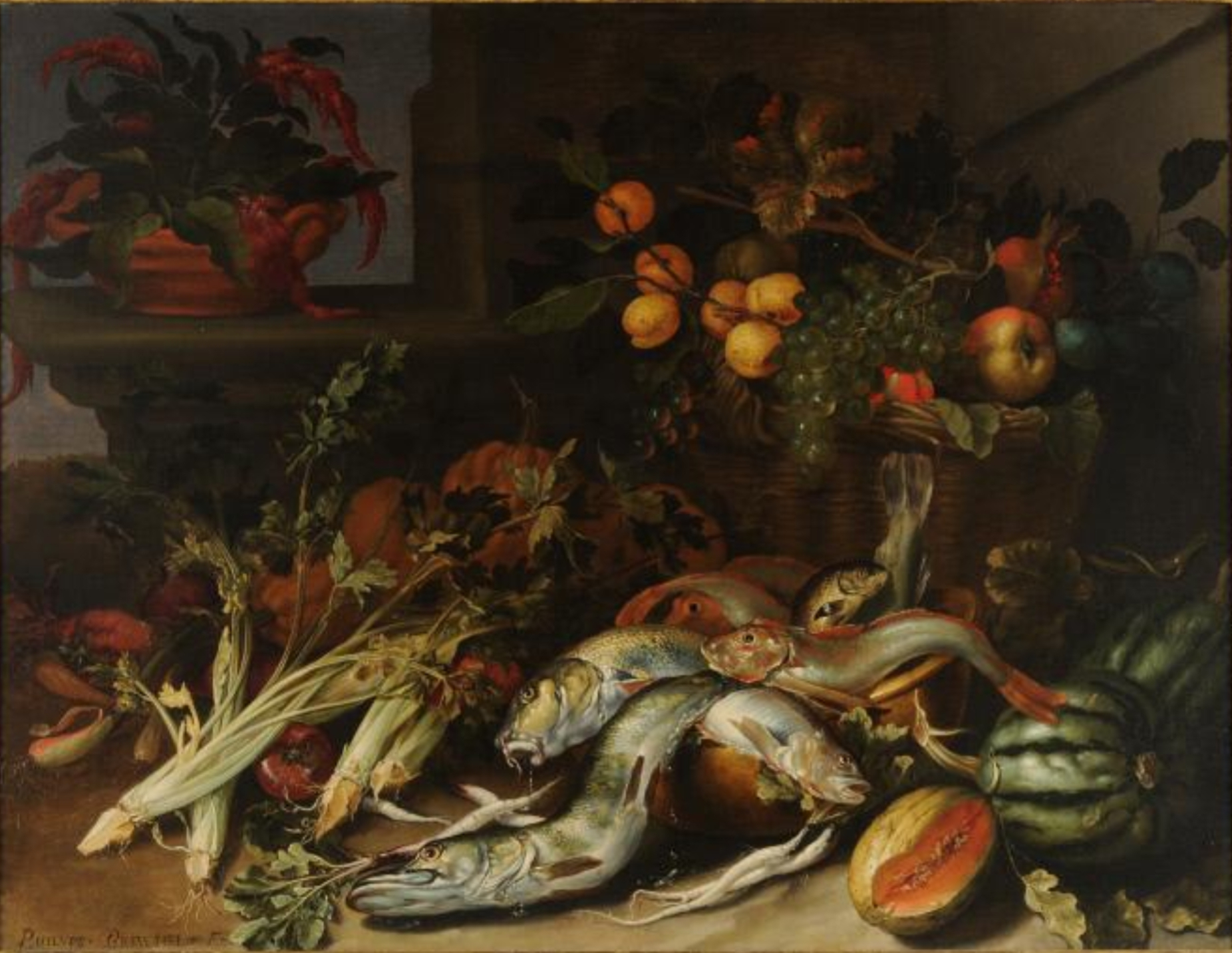
- Pike, Barbel and other Fish in a Bowl, Celery, Radishes, Pumpkins, Melons and a Basket of Fruit by a Stone Wall
- Born: December 24, 1635; Antwerp
- Died: between 1662 (aged 26–27) and 1678 (aged 42–43)
- Occupations: Painter, printmaker
- Family: Brueghel family

Philips Brueghel was a Flemish painter and printmaker. He painted still lifes, history paintings and landscapes. A scion of the famous Brueghel family of painters, he trained in Antwerp with his father and later worked for some time in Paris.

== Life ==
Brueghel was born in Antwerp where he was baptised on 24 December 1635. He was the second son of Jan Brueghel the Younger and Anna-Maria Janssens. His mother was the daughter of the Antwerp history painter Abraham Janssens. His father was the son of Jan Brueghel the Elder, who was one of the most important creative forces in early 17th century Antwerp, a prolific painter in many genres and a frequent collaborator of Rubens. His father had taken over the large workshop of Jan the Elder on his death in 1625 and continued its large output of biblical, mythological, allegorical, genre and still life paintings. Philips' brothers Jan Pieter, Abraham Brueghel, Ferdinand and Jan Baptist Brueghel also became successful artists.

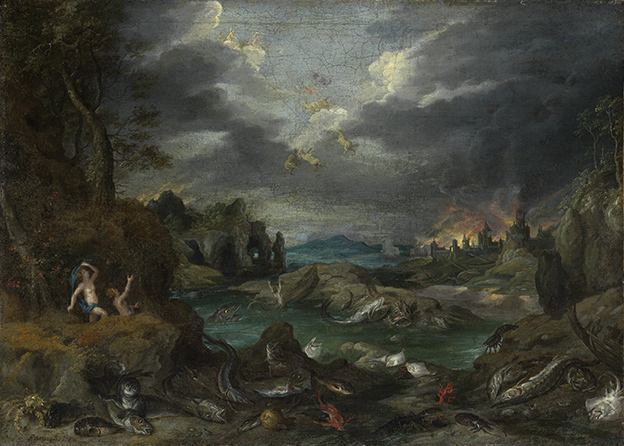
Fall of Phaethon

He trained in the family workshop and joined in the guild year 1654-1655 the Antwerp Guild of St. Luke as a 'wijnmeester', i.e. the son of a master. He continued to work in the family workshop and was sent to work in Paris in the period from 1658 to 1661. Here he lived with his uncle Jan Valdor, the husband of his mother's sister Catherine Janssens. Philips' father had signed a contract for him to work for three years for Valdor for a period of three years. He returned to Antwerp and is mentioned the last time in Antwerp in 1662.

Philips must have died before 1678 as he is not mentioned as an heir when his father died that year.

== Work ==
Very few works of Brueghel are known. He is believed to be the painter of the Fall of Phaethon signed 'P Breughel' (Staatliche Kunsthalle Karlsruhe). A still life of Pike, Barbel and other Fish in a Bowl, Celery, Radishes, Pumpkins, Melons and a Basket of Fruit by a Stone Wall (McMaster Museum of Art) signed 'PHILVPS BREVGHEL' shows a more original approach than that of his painting brothers, who had mainly remained flower painters. This work is reminiscent of the work of Peter van Boucle and other Flemish painters active in Paris.
