= David Teniers =

David Teniers may refer to three Flemish artists, father, son, and grandson:

- David Teniers the Elder (1582–1649), turned from large religious paintings to landscapes and genre scenes
- David Teniers the Younger (1610–1690), the most famous of the three, especially noted for genre scenes of peasant life
- David Teniers III (1638–1685), who painted scenes similar to his father's
