= Jan Brueghel =

Jan Brueghel can refer to two Flemish painters:

- Jan Brueghel the Elder (1568–1625)
- Jan Brueghel the Younger (1601–1678)
