= Brueghel family =

Dutch and Flemish painter family

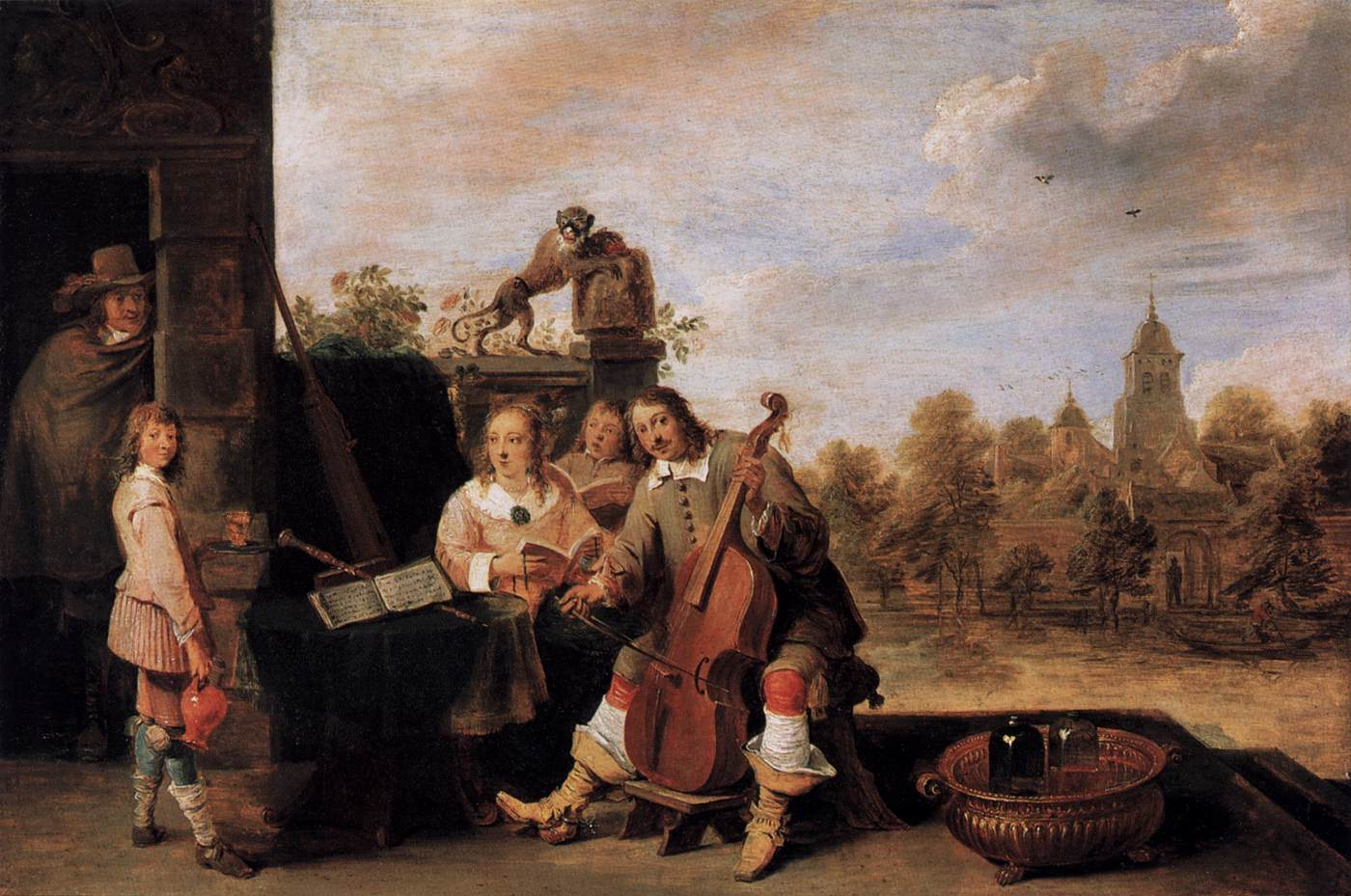
David Teniers the Younger, The Painter and His Family, c. 1645, now in the Gemäldegalerie, Berlin

The Brueghel family (/ˈbrɔɪɡəl/ BROY-gəl, US also /ˈbruːɡəl/ BROO-gəl, Dutch: [ˈbrøːɣəl]), also spelled Bruegel or Breughel, is an extended family of Flemish painters who played a major role in the development of the art in Brabant and Flanders throughout the 16th and 17th centuries. Due to the organisation in guilds and training being done with established painters and not in schools or academies, painters often passed on the knowledge from father to son (or, much more rarely, daughter), and there are many examples of Flemish painting families spanning two or more generations, e.g. the Francken family, which had at least ten painters spanning four generations. The Brueghel family produced the largest number of major painters of all Flemish families.

Pieter Bruegel the Elder used that spelling, but all later members of the family used Brueghel.

== Family tree ==
Mertens-Brueghel-Jode-Teniers family

Jan Mertens the Elder
Jan Mertens the Younger	Peeter Verhulst Bessemeers
Jan van Amstel	Adriane van Dornicke	Anna van Dornicke	Pieter Coecke van Aelst	Mayken Verhulst	Lysbeth Verhulst	Hubert Goltzius	Barbara Verhulst	Jacob de Punder
Gerard de Jode	Gillis van Coninxloo	Pieter Bruegel the Elder	Mayken Coecke	Gillis I Coignet	Juliaen Teniers Joachimszone
Pieter de Jode I	Cornelis de Jode	Pieter Brueghel the Younger	Abraham Janssens	Isabelle de Jode	Jan Brueghel the Elder	Catharina van Mariënburg	Gillis II Coignet	Suzanna Coignet	Juliaen Teniers the Elder	David Teniers the Elder	Erasmus Quellinus I
Pieter de Jode II	Pieter de Brueghel III	Anna-Maria Janssens	Jan Brueghel the Younger	Paschasia Brueghel	Hieronymus van Kessel the Younger	Ambrosius Brueghel	Catharina Brueghel	Jan Baptist Borrekens	Anna Brueghel	David Teniers the Younger	Abraham Teniers	Erasmus Quellinus II
Arnold de Jode	Jan Pieter Brueghel	Abraham Brueghel	Philips Brueghel	Jan Baptist Brueghel	Jan van Kessel the Elder	David Teniers III	Cornelia Teniers	Jan-Erasmus Quellinus
Ferdinand van Kessel	Jan van Kessel the Younger	David Teniers IV

The image above shows the main branch of the family. The complete list of all painters related to this family is longer though. In the below tree only the main family members have been included, not those brothers and sisters who didn't work as an artist or married a known artist.

Jan Mertens the Elder, sculptor, about whom very little is known
+→ Jan Mertens the Younger (died c. 1527), painter, who may be the same as Jan van Dornicke and/or the Master of 1518
¦    +→ Anna van Dornicke (died before 1529)
¦    x Pieter Coecke van Aelst (1502–1550), painter: two of his sons, Pieter II and Pauwel, were also painters
¦    x Mayken Verhulst (1518–1599), painter of miniatures, from a family of painters, and second wife of Pieter Coecke
¦    ¦    +→  Maria or Mayken Coecke
¦    ¦    x Pieter Bruegel the Elder (died 1569), marriage in 1563, to his master's daughter.
¦    ¦    ¦    +→ Pieter Brueghel the Younger (1564–1638)
¦    ¦    ¦    ¦    +→ Pieter Brueghel III (1589–?)
¦    ¦    ¦    +→ Jan Brueghel the Elder (1568–1625)
¦    ¦    ¦    x Isabelle de Jode (died 1603), daughter of engraver Gerard de Jode (1509–1591) and brother to cartographer Cornelis de Jode (1568–1600) and engraver Pieter de Jode I (1570–1634)
¦    ¦    ¦    ¦    +→ Jan Brueghel the Younger (1601–1678): his godfather was Peter Paul Rubens
¦    ¦    ¦    ¦    x Anna-Maria Janssens (1605–1668), daughter of painter Abraham Janssens (1575–1632) and sister of painter Abraham Janssens II
¦    ¦    ¦    ¦    ¦    +→ Jan Pieter Brueghel (1628–1664)
¦    ¦    ¦    ¦    ¦    +→ Abraham Brueghel (1631 – c. 1690), who spent most of his career in Italy
¦    ¦    ¦    ¦    ¦    +→ Philips Brueghel (1635 – in or after 1662), only a few paintings by him are known
¦    ¦    ¦    ¦    ¦    +→ Ferdinand Brueghel (1637 – after 1678)
¦    ¦    ¦    ¦    ¦    +→ Jan Baptist Brueghel (1647–1719), flower painter who spent most of his career in Italy
¦    ¦    ¦    ¦    +→  Paschasia Brueghel
¦    ¦    ¦    ¦    x Hieronymus van Kessel the Younger (1578 – after 1636), painter, son of the painter Hieronymus van Kessel the Elder
¦    ¦    ¦    ¦    ¦    +→ Jan van Kessel the Elder (1626–1679)
¦    ¦    ¦    ¦    ¦    x Maria van Apshoven (married 1646)
¦    ¦    ¦    ¦    ¦    ¦    +→ Ferdinand van Kessel (1648–1696)
¦    ¦    ¦    ¦    ¦    ¦    +→ Jan van Kessel the Younger (1654–1708), painter active in Spain
¦    ¦    ¦    x Catharina van Mariënburg (married 1605)
¦    ¦    ¦    ¦    +→ Anna Brueghel
¦    ¦    ¦    ¦    x David Teniers the Younger (1610–1690), married in 1637: see the Teniers family tree below
¦    ¦    ¦    ¦    +→ Catharina Brueghel
¦    ¦    ¦    ¦    x Jan Baptist Borrekens (1611–1675), married in 1636
¦    ¦    ¦    ¦    +→ Ambrosius Brueghel (1617–1675)

The Teniers family joined the Brueghel family when David Teniers the Younger married Anna Brueghel, granddaughter of Pieter Bruegel the Elder and daughter of Jan Brueghel the Elder, in 1637.

Juliaen Teniers Joachimszone (1532–1585) x Joanna van Maelbeke
+→ Juliaen Teniers the Elder (1572–1615)
x Suzanna Coignet, sister of painter Gillis II Coignet (1586 – after 1641), son of Gillis I Coignet (1542–1599) and father of painters Jacob (1610–1676) and Gillis III
+→ David Teniers the Elder (1582–1649)
x Dymphna Cornelis de Wilde (marriage in 1608)
¦    +→ David Teniers the Younger (1610–1690)
¦    x Anna Brueghel, marriage in 1637
¦    ¦    +→ David Teniers III (1638–1685)
¦    ¦    x  Ana María Bonnaerens, marriage in 1671
¦    ¦    ¦    +→ David Teniers IV, painter of whom very little is known
¦    ¦    +→ Cornelia Teniers (1640–1706)
¦    ¦    x Jan-Erasmus Quellinus (1634–1715), painter, last notable member of the large Quellinus family of sculptors and painters, the son of Erasmus Quellinus II and a grandson of Erasmus Quellinus I
¦    +→ Juliaen Teniers the Younger (1616–1679)
¦    +→ Theodoor Teniers (1619–1697)
¦    +→ Abraham Teniers (1629–1670)

== Notes ==
The main information comes from Ecartico, an artist genealogy database from the University of Amsterdam, and the artists database of the Netherlands Institute for Art History.
