= Ambrosius Brueghel =

Flemish painter (1617–1675)

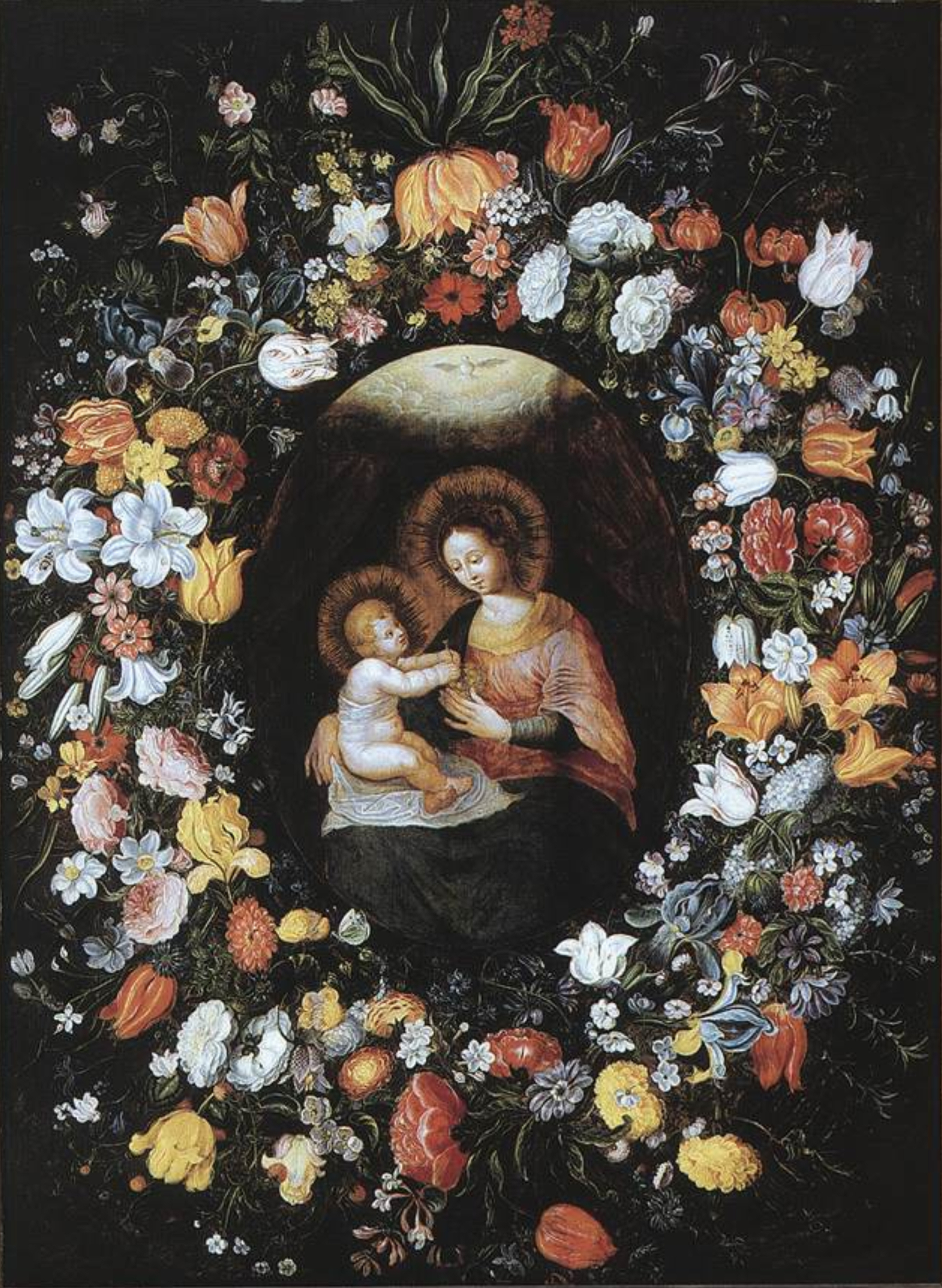
- Holy Virgin and Child in a flower garland
- Born: 10 August 1617; Antwerp
- Died: 9 February 1675 (aged 57)
- Occupation: Painter
- Spouse: Anna Clara van Triest (m. 1649)
- Children: 4
- Father: Jan Brueghel the Elder
- Family: Brueghel family

Ambrosius Brueghel (Dutch: [ɑmˈbroːzijʏz ˈbrøːɣəl]; baptized 10 August 1617 – 9 February 1675) was a Flemish painter from the famous Brueghel family of artists. Less prolific and less well-known than a number of his family members, his oeuvre is not very well understood and is believed to comprise Baroque still lifes, garland paintings as well as landscapes.

== Life ==
Ambrosius Brueghel was born in Antwerp as the son of Jan Brueghel the Elder and Catharina van Marienburg. His father was one of the leading painters in Antwerp and the son of the famous Renaissance painter Pieter Brueghel the Elder. His older (half)-brother Jan Brueghel the Younger was also a painter and took over the workshop of their father on his death in 1625. His sister Anna married the prominent court painter David Teniers the Younger in 1637. Ambrosius is known to have collaborated with his brother-in-law on some landscapes with genre scenes. His sister Paschasia married the painter Hieronymous van Kessel the Younger. Another sister Catharina married the painter Jan Baptist Borrekens.

As his father died when Ambrosius was only seven years old, he was placed under the guardianship of prominent painters Hendrick van Balen, Cornelis Schut and Pieter de Jode the Elder. Hendrick van Balen fostered his artistic training. It is possible that Ambrosius trained with his brother Jan.

Ambrosius is believed to have had plans to travel abroad after 10 September 1639 as he made a will on that date. The making of a will was customary at the time for persons who were about to embark on a long trip. It is not clear whether he ever made that trip or whether it was very short as a few months after that date he is still recorded in Antwerp and in August 1641 he is in Antwerp making a settlement with his brother Jan and his brother-in-law David Teniers who were his new guardians.

Ambrosius Brueghel became a member of the Antwerp Guild of Saint Luke in 1645. In 1649 he became a member of the chamber of rhetoric De Violieren. On 21 February of the same year he married Anna Clara van Triest who was from a well-to-do family. The couple would have four children. The artist was well-respected in the community and was appointed 'wijkmeester' (warden) of his district. In 1650, Ambrosius Brueghel visited his brother Jan in Paris.

He served as deacon of the Guild in 1653, 1665, 1671 and 1673.

== Work ==
Ambrosius Brueghel's work has been described as being in the same style as that of his father. The problem is that only very few works have been attributed to this artist and many of the attributions have been challenged. Regularly still lifes have been attributed to Ambrosius Brueghel, but none of these attributions are firm. A vanitas still life discovered in 1966 of a large vase of flowers marked AB was attributed to Ambrosius but it is now given to Adriaen van Nieulandt. The only painting that has been attributed to the artist with some level of certainty is the Holy Virgin and Child in a flower garland (Saint James Church, Antwerp). This painting falls in the genre of garland paintings, a special type of still life developed in Antwerp by artists including his father Jan Brueghel the Elder, his guardian Hendrick van Balen, Frans Francken the Younger, Peter Paul Rubens and Daniel Seghers. They typically show a flower garland around a devotional image or portrait. This genre was inspired by the cult of veneration and devotion to Mary prevalent at the Habsburg court (then the rulers over the Southern Netherlands) and in Antwerp generally.

Landscapes by Ambrosius have been recorded in the estate of the family of his guardian Hendrick van Balen. A landscape signed and dated Ambrosius Breughel fecit 1653 was in 1876 in the collection of J. Lenglart in Lille, while another Landscape, allegedly with figures by his brother-in-law David Teniers the Younger, signed Ambrosius Broeghel, was in the Fahnenburg near Düsseldorf in 1894. The location of these paintings is now unknown.

== Family tree ==
Brueghel family tree

Pieter Bruegel the Elder
Pieter Brueghel the Younger	Jan Brueghel the Elder
Ambrosius Brueghel	Jan Brueghel the Younger	Anna Brueghel x David Teniers the Younger	Paschasia Brueghel	Hieronymous van Kessel the Younger
Jan Pieter Brueghel	Abraham Brueghel	Jan Baptist Brueghel	Jan van Kessel the Elder
