= Jan Pieter Brueghel =

Flemish painter (1628–c. 1674)

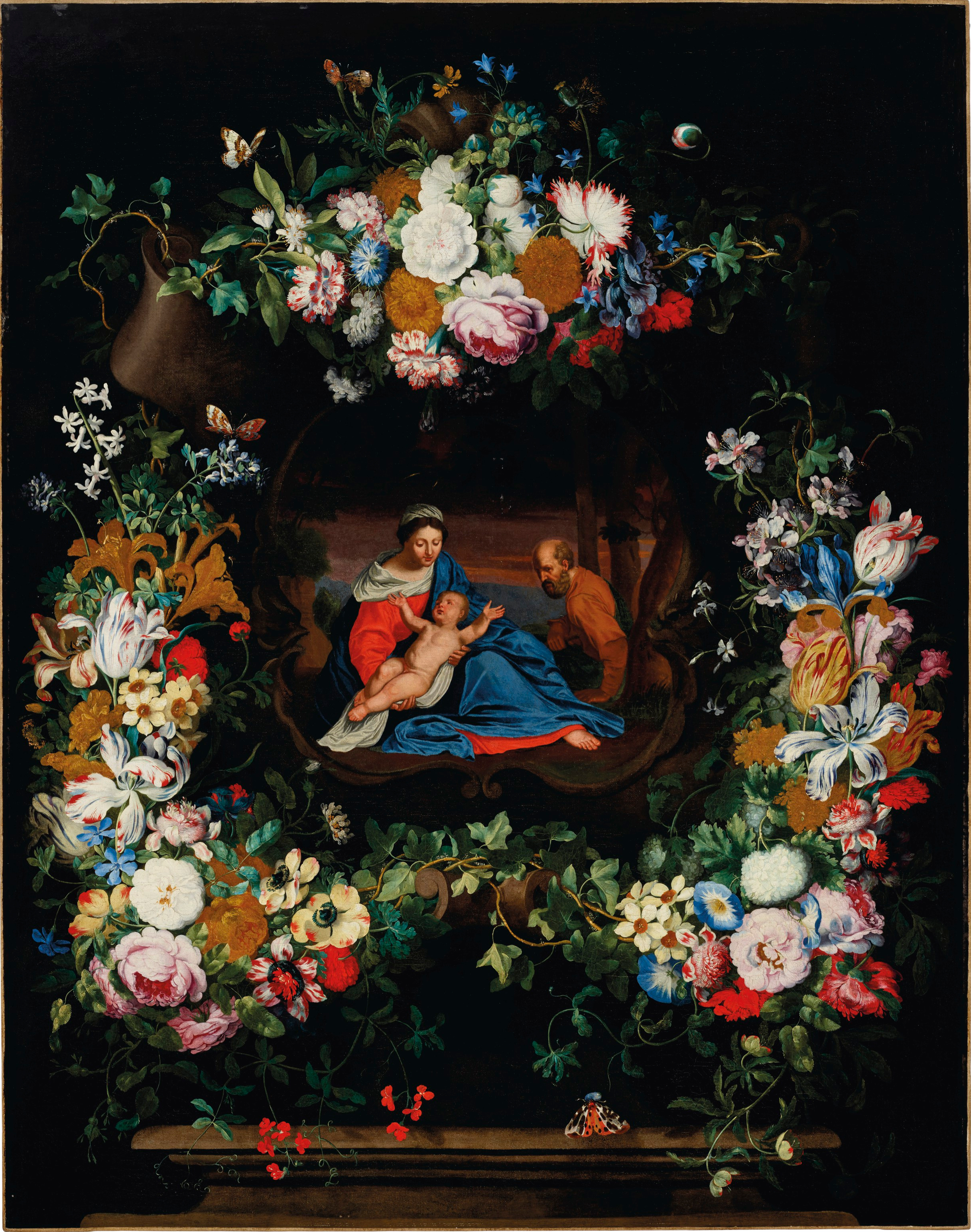
Virgin and Child with St Joseph in a garland of flowers

Jan Pieter Brueghel or Jan Peeter Brueghel (29 August 1628 (baptised) – between 1664 and 1684) was a Flemish painter who specialised in flower still lifes and garland paintings. A scion of the famous Brueghel family of painters, he trained in Antwerp with his father and later worked in Liège, Paris and Italy.

== Life ==
Brueghel was born in Antwerp where he was baptised on 29 August 1628. He was the son of Jan Brueghel the Younger and Anna-Maria Janssens. His mother was the daughter of the Antwerp history painter Abraham Janssens. His father was the son of Jan Brueghel the Elder, who was one of the most important creative forces in early 17th century Antwerp, a prolific painter in many genres and a frequent collaborator of Rubens. His father had taken over the large workshop of Jan the Elder on his death in 1625 and continued its large output of biblical, mythological, allegorical, genre and still life paintings. Jan Pieter's brothers Abraham Brueghel, Philips, Ferdinand and Jan Baptist Brueghel also became successful artists.

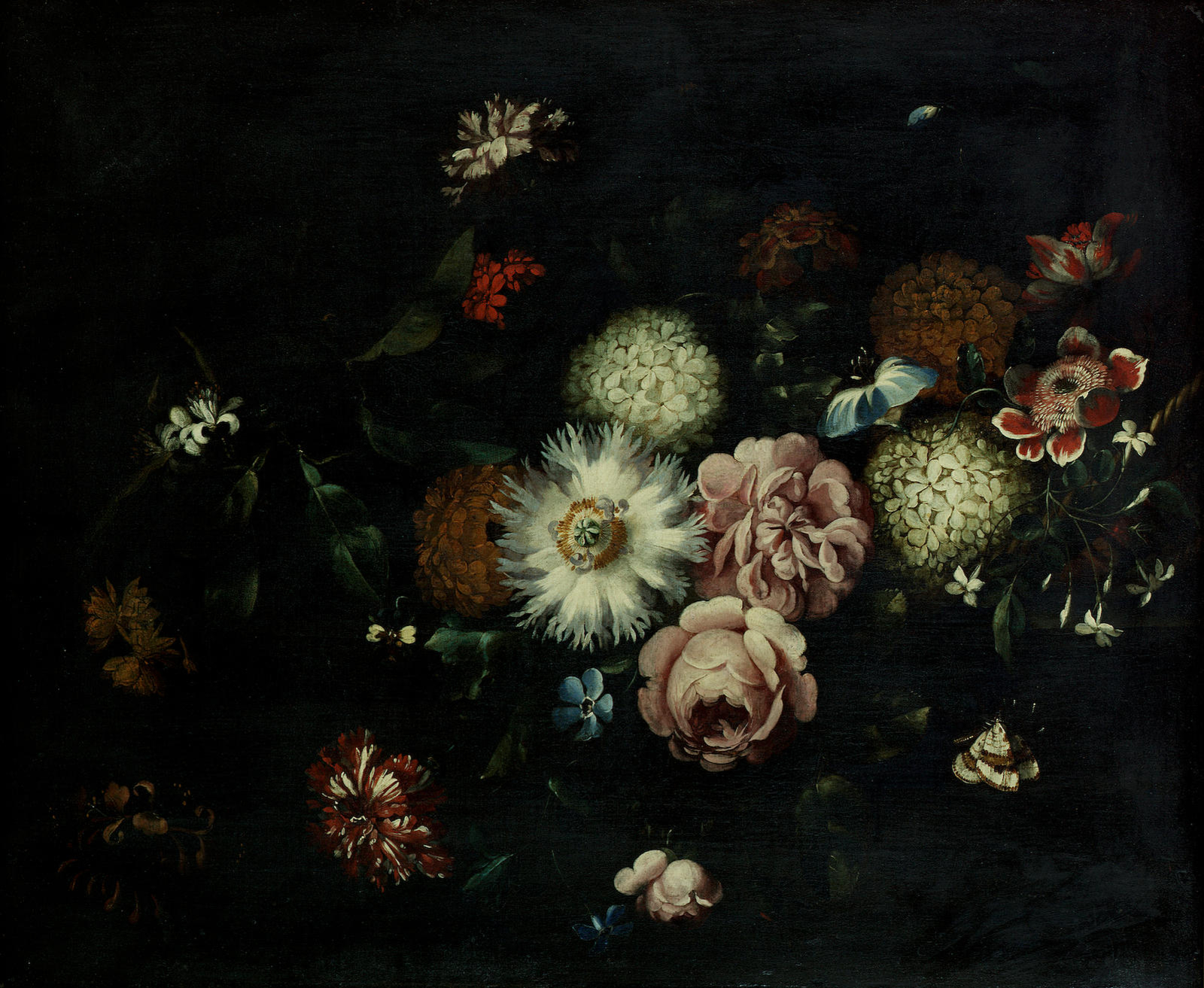
Flowers on a stone ledge with a butterfly

He trained in the family workshop and joined in 1645 the Antwerp Guild of St. Luke as a 'wijnmeester', i.e. the son of a master. He stayed in Liège for a while where he worked in the workshop of Walther Damery. He possibly studied with Jacques Damery, the brother of his host. He is recorded together with his father in Antwerp in 1660, as a witness against canon Francis Van Hilleverve. He also worked briefly in Paris but was again a resident of Antwerp in 1662.

He was in Italy from 1664 where he was recorded in Venice. His younger brother Abraham had already proceeded him to Italy and had lived in Rome since 1659. A painting by him of a Garland of flowers with the return of the Prodigal Son painted in collaboration with Erasmus Quellinus II was sent by him to Frankfurt via the art dealer Guillam Forchondt the Elder.

It is believed that Jan Pieter continued to work in Italy and died there before 1684.

== Work ==
=== General ===
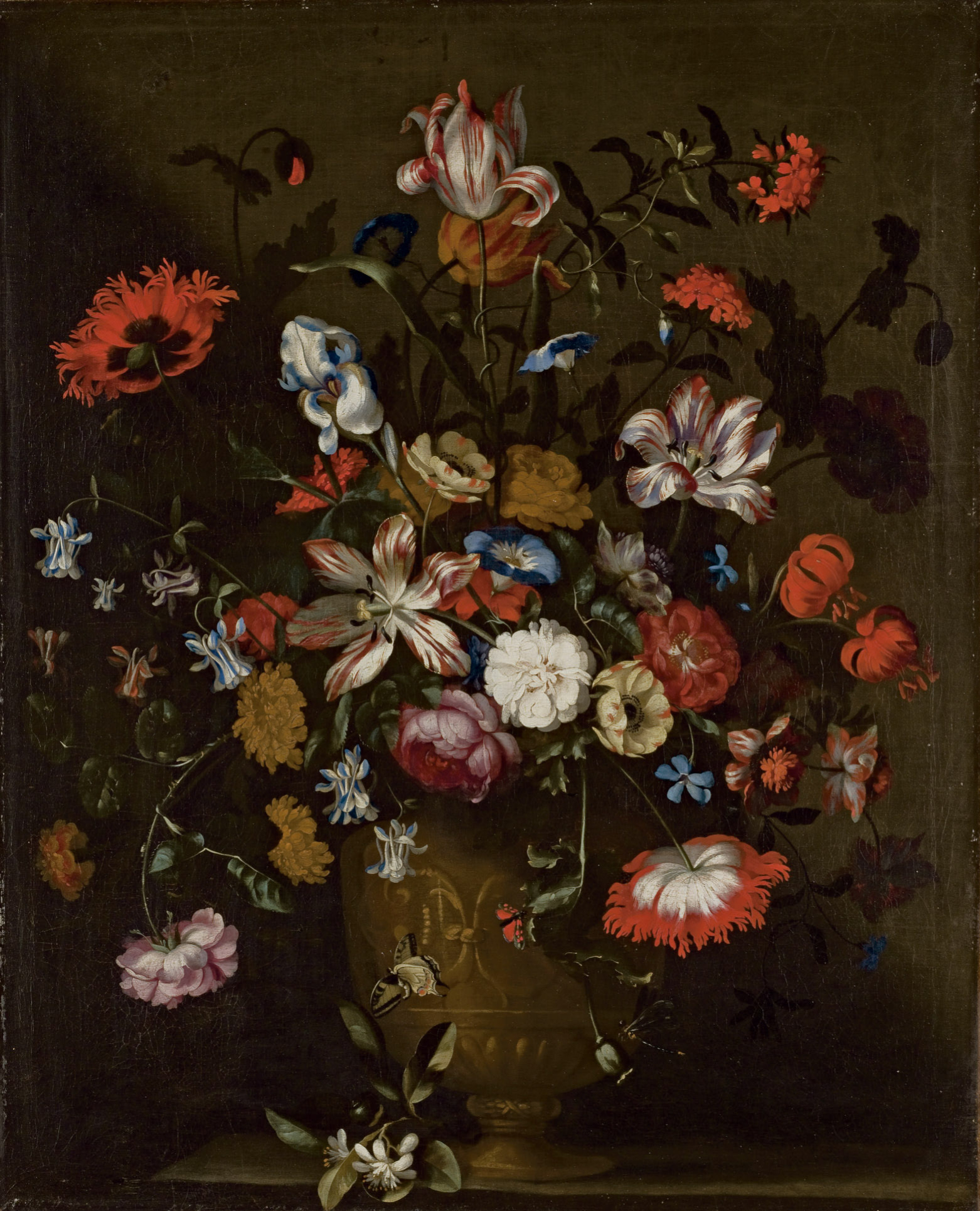
Tulips, irises, roses, volubilis and other flowers in a vase

Brueghel painted flower bouquets in vases and flower garland paintings. Only a few fully or partially signed paintings have been located. An example is the Floral still life with roses in a glass vase (Dorotheum Vienna auction of 21 October 2014, lot 25), which is one of a pair of flowers still lifes and bears the signature 'J. P. Brueghel'. As he signed some of his works with 'Jan Br., some of his works have been attributed to his father and grandfather.

The signed works have been the basis for attributing additional works to the artist, which had previously been attributed to other Flemish flower painters such as Jan Brueghel the Elder, Daniel Seghers, Jan Philip van Thielen, Jan Baptist Bosschaert, Jan van Kessel the Elder, Gaspar Peeter Verbruggen the Younger and Dutch painters such as Rachel Ruysch, Jan van Huijsum and Simon Pietersz Verelst.

=== Flower pieces ===
His style was highly influenced by his grandfather Jan Brueghel the Elder and Jan Davidsz. de Heem. In the tradition of other Antwerp flower paintings, he did not paint the flower bouquets directly from life. His bouquets are often made up of flowers which bloom in different seasons. The actual size of different flower species is also not respected as the stems of some of the smaller flowers are often extended so that they can match up with the taller flowers.

The bouquets were in fact created by using studies of individual blooms created at the time when the flowers where in season or copied from other sources. These flower paintings have been interpreted as having a symbolic meaning or possibly even moral intent. As they represent flowers and insects which only live for a brief moment, they are supposed to convey a vanitas paintings and encourage the viewer to reflect on the transience of worldly things and live a moral life. However, the principal aim of the artist in these works appears rather to create a convincing illusionistic effect.

=== Garland paintings ===
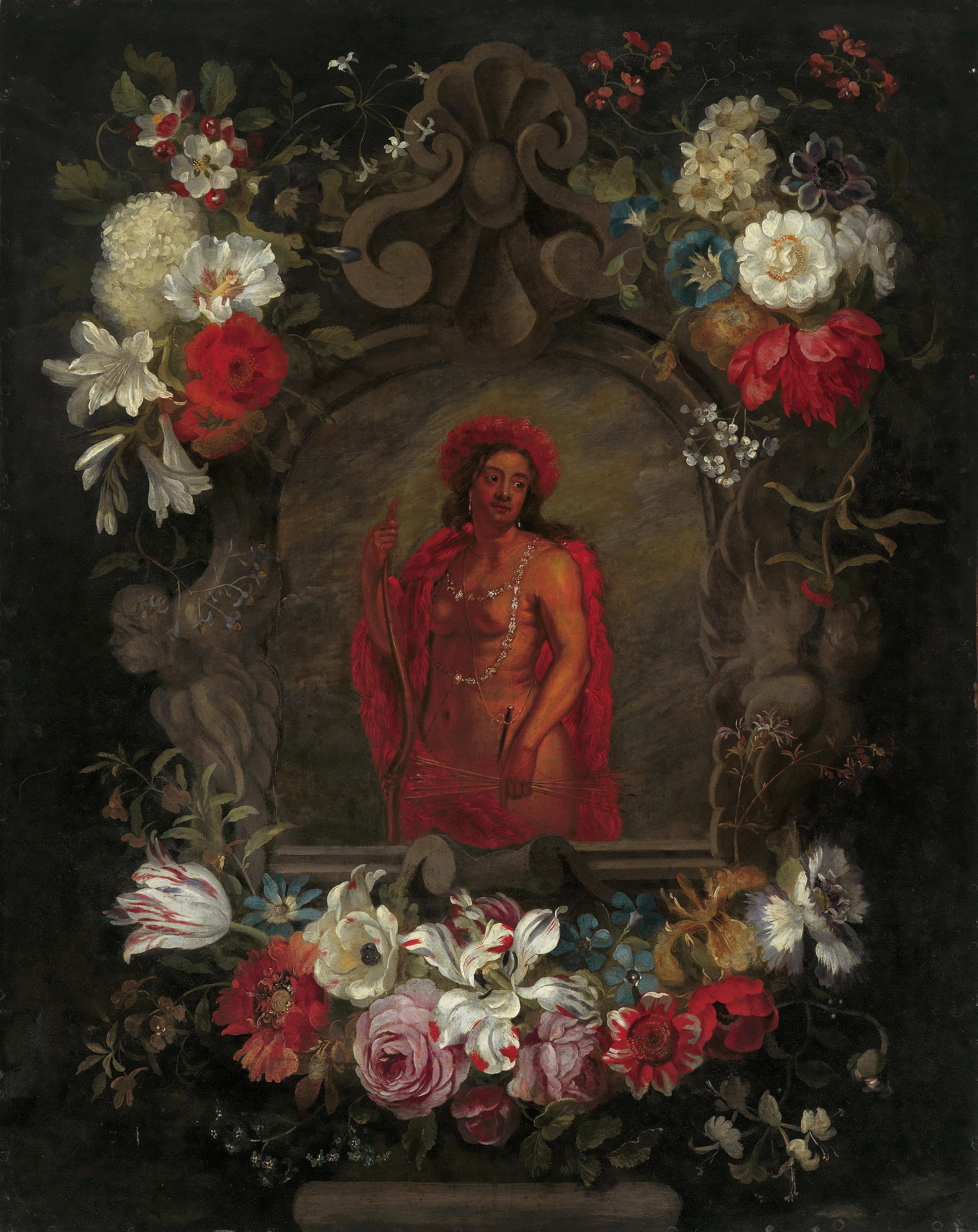
Cartouche with a personification of America, surrounded by flowers

Brueghel collaborated with figure painters in the creation of garland paintings. Garland paintings are a special type of still life developed in Antwerp by artists such as Jan Pieter's grandfather Jan Brueghel the Elder, Hendrick van Balen, Frans Francken the Younger, Peter Paul Rubens and Daniel Seghers. They typically show a flower garland around a devotional image or portrait. This genre was inspired by the cult of veneration and devotion to Mary prevalent at the Habsburg court (then the rulers over the southern Netherlands) and in Antwerp generally. In the later development of the genre, the cartouche in the centre of garland paintings was often a secular scene such as a portrait or an allegorical subject.

Garland paintings were usually collaborations between a still life and a figure painter. Brueghel collaborated with specialist figure artists who would paint the devotional images in the cartouche while Brueghel painted the flowers and flower garlands in the picture. The Antwerp painter Erasmus Quellinus II was one of his more frequent collaborators on his garland paintings. An example is their collaborative Virgin and Child with St Joseph in a garland of flowers (Christie's online auction of 1-20 October 2020 lot 54). In many works, his collaborators on these works cannot be identified with certainty and are described variously as 'follower of Jan Boeckhorst' as in the Cartouche with a personification of America, surrounded by flowers (Christie's London auction of 26 April 2006 lot 206) or 'circle of Cornelis Schut as in the Mystic marriage of Saint Catherine, surrounded by an oval garland of flowers (Christie's London auction of 3 December 1997 lot 197).

== Brueghel family tree ==
Brueghel family tree

Pieter Bruegel the Elder
Pieter Brueghel the Younger	Jan Brueghel the Elder
Ambrosius Brueghel	Jan Brueghel the Younger	Anna Brueghel x David Teniers the Younger	Paschasia Brueghel	Hieronymous van Kessel the Younger
Jan Pieter Brueghel	Abraham Brueghel	Jan Baptist Brueghel	Jan van Kessel the Elder
