= Abraham Brueghel =

Flemish painter (1631–c. 1690)

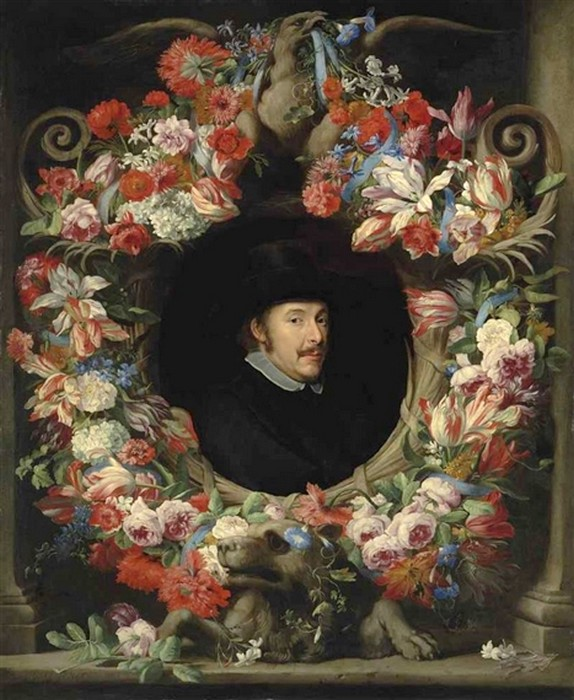
- Sculptural cartouche with garland, possibly a self-portrait
- Born: 28 November 1631; Antwerp
- Died: c. 1690 (aged 58–59); Naples
- Occupation: Painter
- Spouses: Angela Buratti (died c. 1669) and Angela Borani (died 1678)
- Family: Brueghel family

Abraham Brueghel (baptised 28 November 1631 – c. 1690) was a Flemish painter from the famous Brueghel family of artists. He emigrated at a young age to Italy where he played an important role in the development of the style of decorative Baroque still lifes.

== Life ==
=== Early life ===
Abraham was born in Antwerp, the son of Jan Brueghel the Younger, the grandson of Jan Brueghel the Elder and the great-grandson of Pieter Brueghel the Elder. Much of his artistic training came from his father, Jan Brueghel the Younger, a prolific painter and regular collaborator with Rubens. Abraham showed great promise as an artist from an early age, and started to make a name for himself in his teenage years. His father sold one of Abraham's floral still lifes when he was only 15 years old.

=== Move to Italy ===
In 1649, at the age of 18, Abraham went to Italy to complete a commission for Prince Antonio Ruffo in Sicily. It was the first of many commissions in which Abraham demonstrated his artistic abilities as a floral still life painter. Already in 1649 an inventory of his patron Prince Antonio Ruffo records nine flower paintings by the 18-year-old artist.

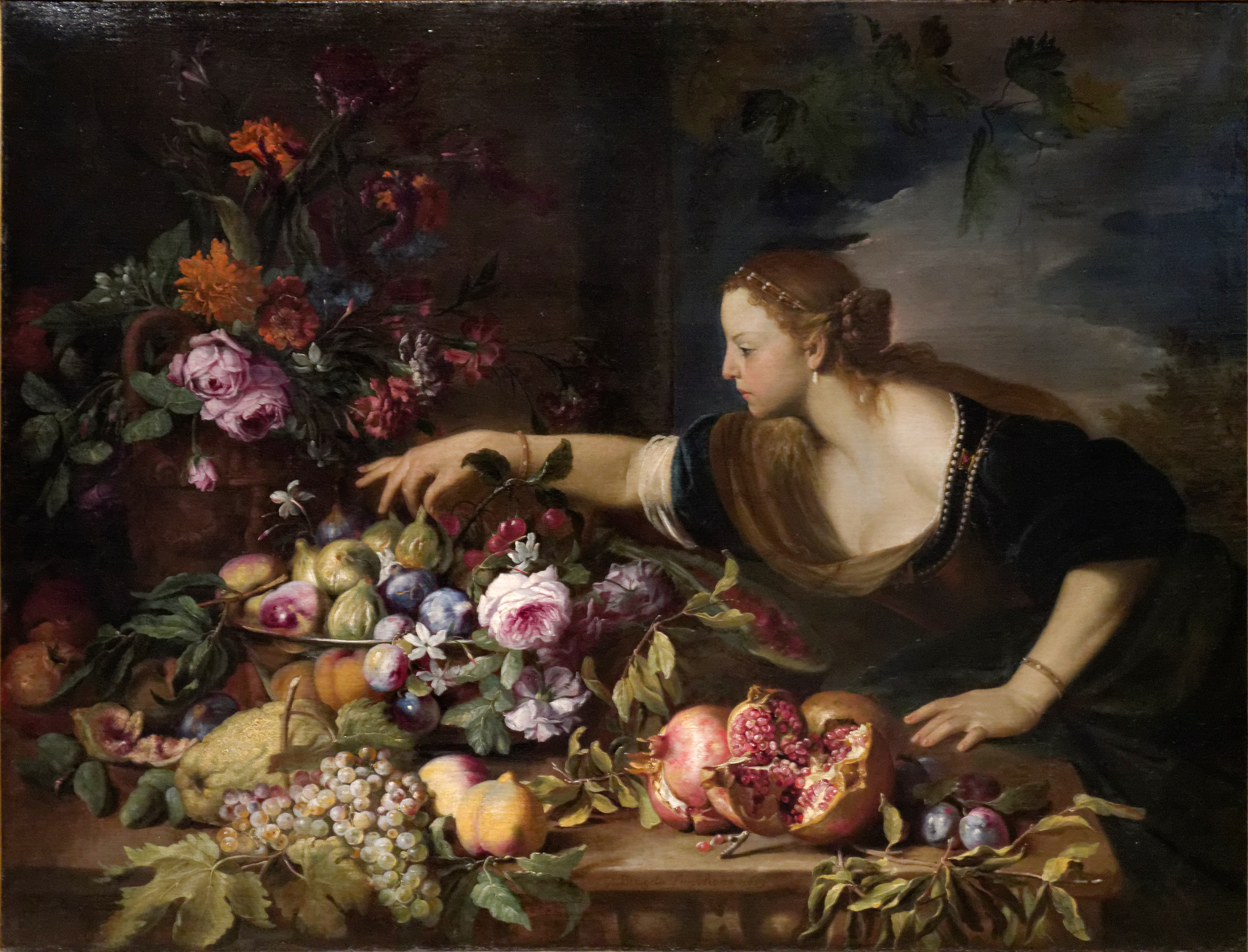
Woman grasping fruits

In 1659, Brueghel moved to Rome, Italy where in 1660 he lived on Via Babuino. He married Angela Buratti (died c. 1669) in 1666. In 1670 he was invited into the prestigious Accademia di San Luca, a Roman academy, which had as its objective the elevation of the work of artists.

Abraham joined the Bentvueghels, an association of mainly Dutch and Flemish artists working in Rome. It was customary for the Bentvueghels to adopt an appealing nickname, the so-called 'bent name'. He was given the bent name Rijngraaf, meaning 'duke of the Rhine', which was an old aristocratic title in Germany. When Abraham Genoels joined the Bentvueghels in 1670, Abraham Brueghel signed the bentbrief as "Abraham Breugel". He was around 1660 sued for allegedly hitting the French painter Francois Chiave with a plate near Via Babuino. The motive for the attack was stated to be negative comments which the Frenchman had made about Brueghel.

Some time between 1672 and 1675, Abraham left Rome to move to Naples, Italy. Here he married on 28 October 1672 Maria Angela Borani (Boccati or Boccabella, died 1678). He played an important role in the development of still life painting in Naples, which had, before his arrival in the city, resisted the Flemish-Roman style of decorative still lifes.

Breughel remained in Naples until his death. He is believed to have died c. 1690 in Naples and in any event no later than 1697.

== Work ==
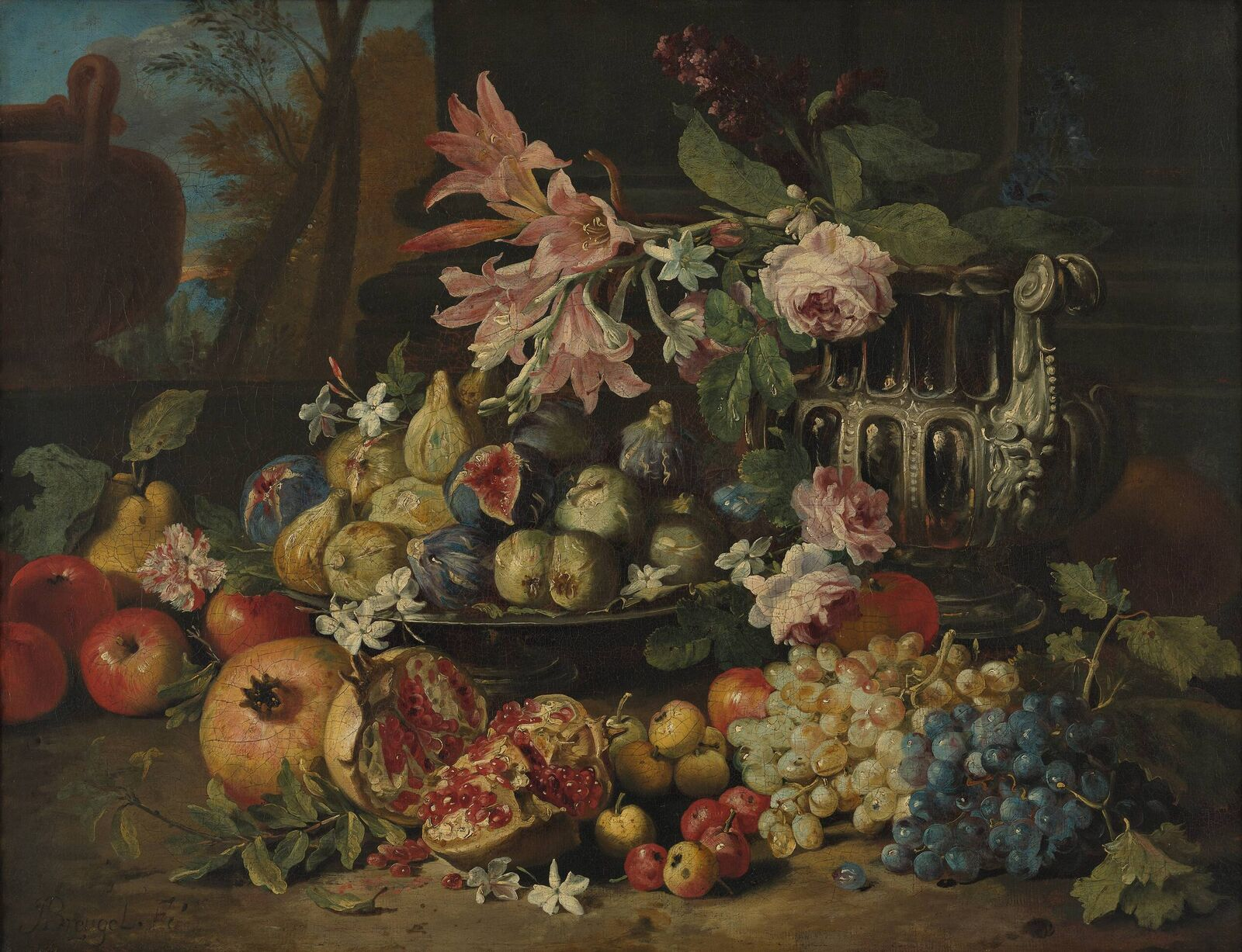
A still life of fruit and flowers in a landscape

Abraham Brueghel established a reputation for his still lifes and in particular, floral still lives. One hunting still life signed and dated by him is known. Due to the lack of evolution during the artist's mature period and the scarcity of dated works, it is difficult to establish a chronology of Abraham's artistic development. His brushstrokes were generally slightly more painterly during his Roman period, while his palette became brighter and stronger during his later years.

The increasingly lush still lifes of the Flemish painters Frans Snyders, Jan Fyt and Pieter Boel who had also worked in Italy were the principal influences on Abraham Brueghel. Joannes Hermans, another Flemish painter in Rome also painted grandiose still lifes combining human figures, flowers and fruit, which anticipated Brueghel's arrival in Rome in 1653. Brueghel combined the Flemish preference for decorative profusion and anecdote with the sweeping movement of the High Baroque of his Italian contemporaries, such as Michele Pace del Campidoglio and Michelangelo Cerquozzi. The result of the complementary influences were compositions that appear casual, while maintaining strong composition and clarity of detail.

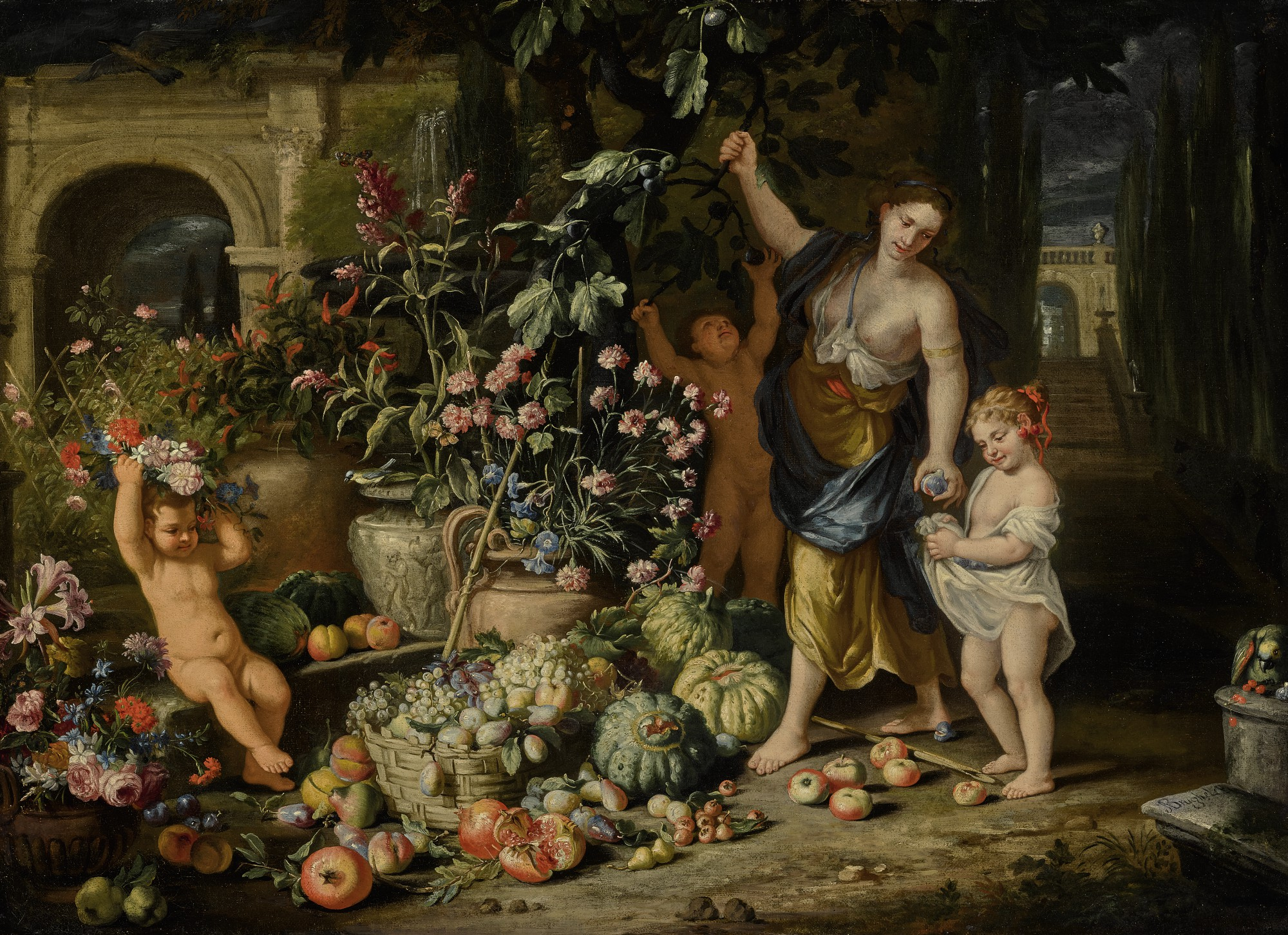
Young woman picking figs with three children in a terraced garden, with Nicola Vaccaro

Abraham Brueghel is especially known for his still life paintings of southern fruits and flowers, which were typically assembled in front of a landscape. They are frequently enhanced by a precious vase, an antique monument or fragments of Roman sculpture. His cartouches are heavier and more decorative.

He often collaborated with other specialist painters to create complex Baroque compositions. He usually painted the landscapes in these collaborations himself while the staffage was created by well-known Italian painters, such as Carlo Maratta, Giovanni Battista Gaulli, Nicola Vaccaro and Giacinto Brandi. A few collaborations between Abraham Brueghel and Guillaume Courtois, a French painter active in Rome, are recorded. An example is the Still life of fruits and flowers with a figure (Sold at Sotheby's on 29 January 2015 in New York, lot 302). The still life was painted by Brueghel while Courtois painted the figure. The painting is a variant of the Grapes and pomegranate with a vase of flowers and a female figure (private collection), which has been dated to the end of the 1660s.

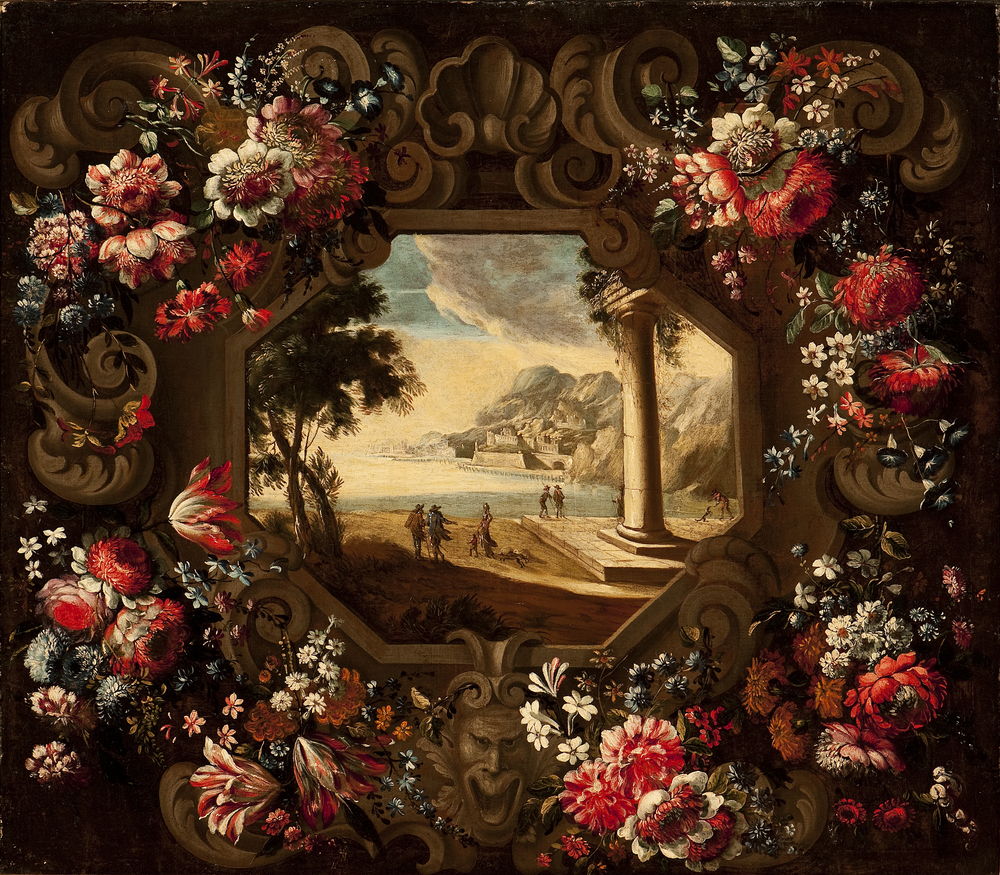
Flower garland and marine landscape of the Golf of Gaeta, with Gennaro Greco

He also collaborated with specialist landscape and vedute painters to create collaborative works combining landscape and still life painting. An example is the Flower garland and marine landscape of the Golf of Gaeta, a collaboration with vedute painter Gennaro Greco. It shows in the centre a harbour scene with figures in the foreground which is surrounded by a flower garland. The work is characteristic of late 17th century Neapolitan painting which aimed almost exclusively at ornamental and decorative effect rather than at naturalism. This type of painting falls into the category of 'garland paintings', a type of still life invented in early 17th century Antwerp by Abraham's grandfather Jan Brueghel the Elder. It became popular and leading Flemish still life painters, in particular Daniel Seghers, helped spread the genre abroad. Paintings in this genre initially showed a flower or, less frequently, a fruit garland surrounding a devotional image. In the later development of the genre, the devotional image was replaced by other subjects such as portraits, mythological subjects, allegorical scenes and landscapes.

== Family tree ==
Brueghel family tree

Pieter Bruegel the Elder
Pieter Brueghel the Younger	Jan Brueghel the Elder
Ambrosius Brueghel	Jan Brueghel the Younger	Anna Brueghel x David Teniers the Younger	Paschasia Brueghel	Hieronymous van Kessel the Younger
Jan Pieter Brueghel	Abraham Brueghel	Jan Baptist Brueghel	Jan van Kessel the Elder
