= Jan Baptist Brueghel =

Flemish Baroque flower painter

Jan Baptist Brueghel (baptised 26 December 1647 – 1719) was a Flemish Baroque flower painter.

== Biography ==
Brueghel was born in Antwerp. He travelled to Rome where he joined the Bentvueghels, an association of mainly Dutch and Flemish artists working in Rome. It was customary for the Bentvueghels to adopt an appealing nickname, the so-called 'bent name'. Jan Baptist Brueghel was given the bent name "Meleager". The early Dutch biographer Houbraken mentioned Brueghel in a poem about the Bentvueghels at the end of his second volume on artists. Houbraken mentioned him again in his third volume in the list of artists who signed Abraham Genoels' bentbrief.

He was the younger brother of Abraham Brueghel who accompanied him to Naples, but returned to Rome after his brother's death. Like his brother, he is known for fruit still lifes.

Jan Baptist Brueghel died in Rome.

Brueghel family tree

Pieter Bruegel the Elder
Pieter Brueghel the Younger	Jan Brueghel the Elder
Ambrosius Brueghel	Jan Brueghel the Younger	Anna Brueghel x David Teniers the Younger	Paschasia Brueghel	Hieronymous van Kessel the Younger
Jan Pieter Brueghel	Abraham Brueghel	Jan Baptist Brueghel	Jan van Kessel the Elder

== Sources ==
- Jan Baptist Brueghel on Artnet
