= Jan Brueghel the Younger =

Flemish painter (1601–1678)

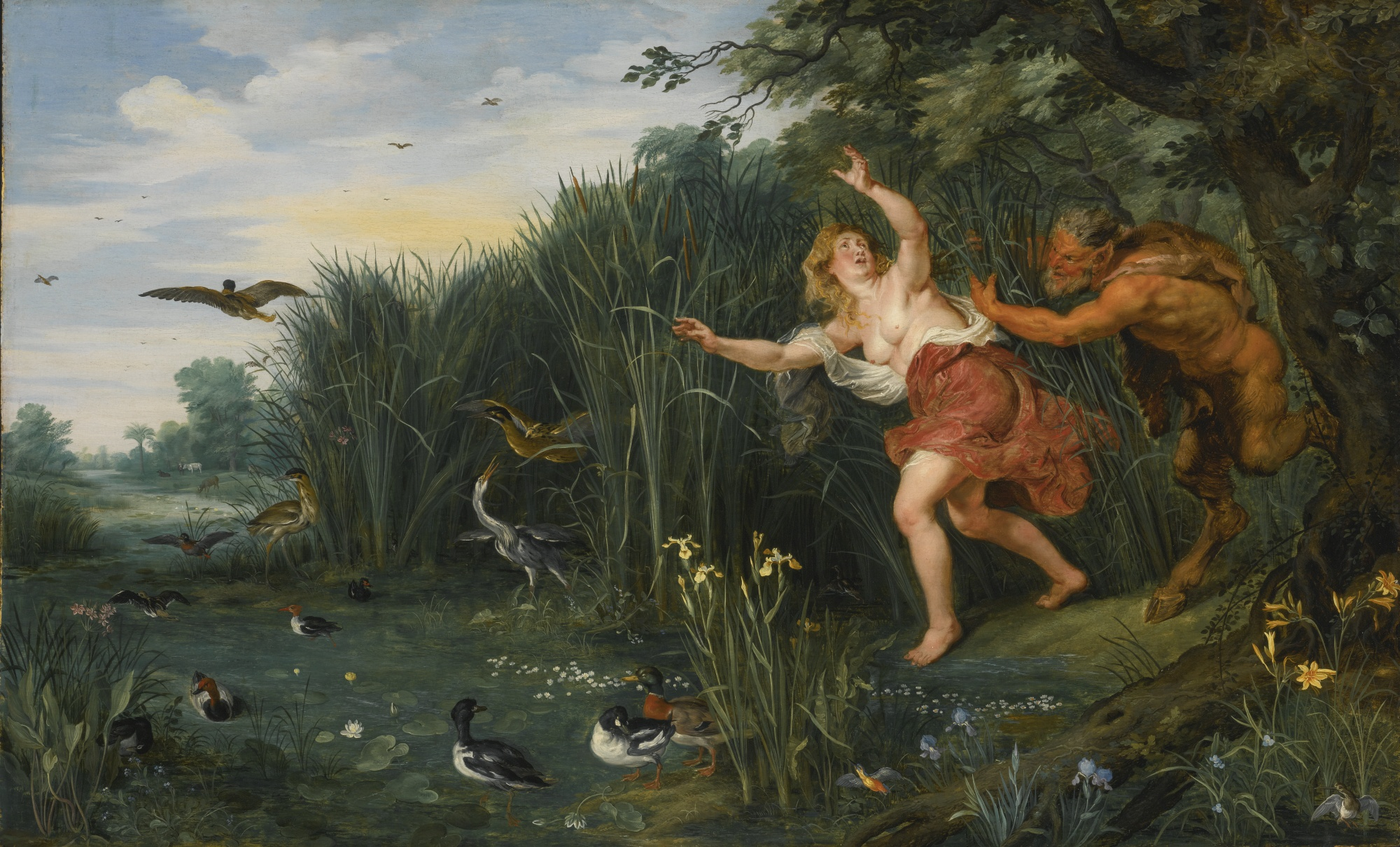
- Landscape with Pan and Syrinx, figures by Rubens
- Born: 13 September 1601; Antwerp
- Died: 1 September 1678 (aged 76); Antwerp
- Occupation: Painter
- Notable work: Adam and Eve in the Garden of Eden
- Spouse: Anna Maria Janssens (m. 1626)

Jan Brueghel (also Bruegel or Breughel) the Younger (/ˈbrɔɪɡəl/ BROY-gəl, US also /ˈbruːɡəl/ BROO-gəl; Dutch: [ˈjɑm ˈbrøːɣəl]; 13 September 1601 – 1 September 1678) was a Flemish Baroque painter. He was the son of Jan Brueghel the Elder, and grandson of Pieter Bruegel the Elder, both prominent painters who contributed respectively to the development of Renaissance and Baroque painting in the Habsburg Netherlands. Taking over his father's workshop at an early age, he largely painted the same subjects as his father in a style which was similar to that of his father. He gradually was able to break away from his father's style by developing a broader, more painterly, and less structured manner of painting. He regularly collaborated with leading Flemish painters of his time.

== Life ==
Jan Brueghel was born in Antwerp on 13 September 1601 as the son of Jan and Isabella de Jode. His mother was the daughter of the cartographer, engraver and publisher Gerard de Jode. He trained with his father in his workshop. His father was a friend and close collaborator of Rubens. Jan likely assisted with his father's large-scale commissions.

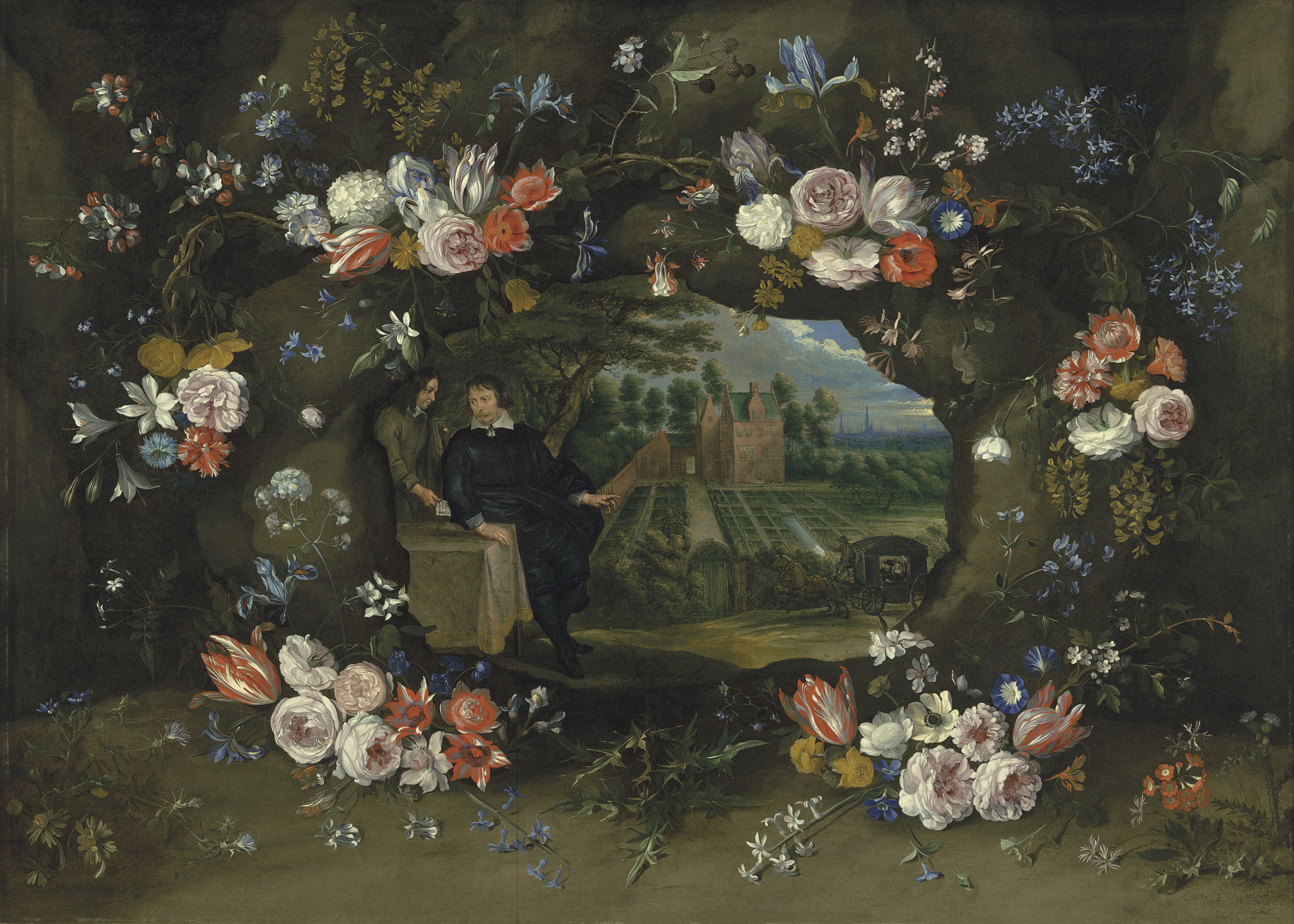
Nicolaas de Man at his country estate, portrait by Jan Thomas van Ieperen and landscape by Lucas van Uden

On the wishes of his father he traveled around 1622 to Milan where he was welcomed by Cardinal Federico Borromeo. The cardinal was a patron and friend of his father who had met in Rome about 30 years earlier. In what was likely an act of rebellion against his father, he went to Genoa where he stayed with his cousins, the Antwerp painters and art dealers Lucas de Wael and Cornelis de Wael. Their mother was a sister of Jan's mother. At the time his friend and fellow Antwerp artist Anthony van Dyck was also active in Genoa. He later worked in Valletta on Malta in 1623. From 1624 to 1625 he lived in Palermo on Sicily at the time when van Dyck was also working there.

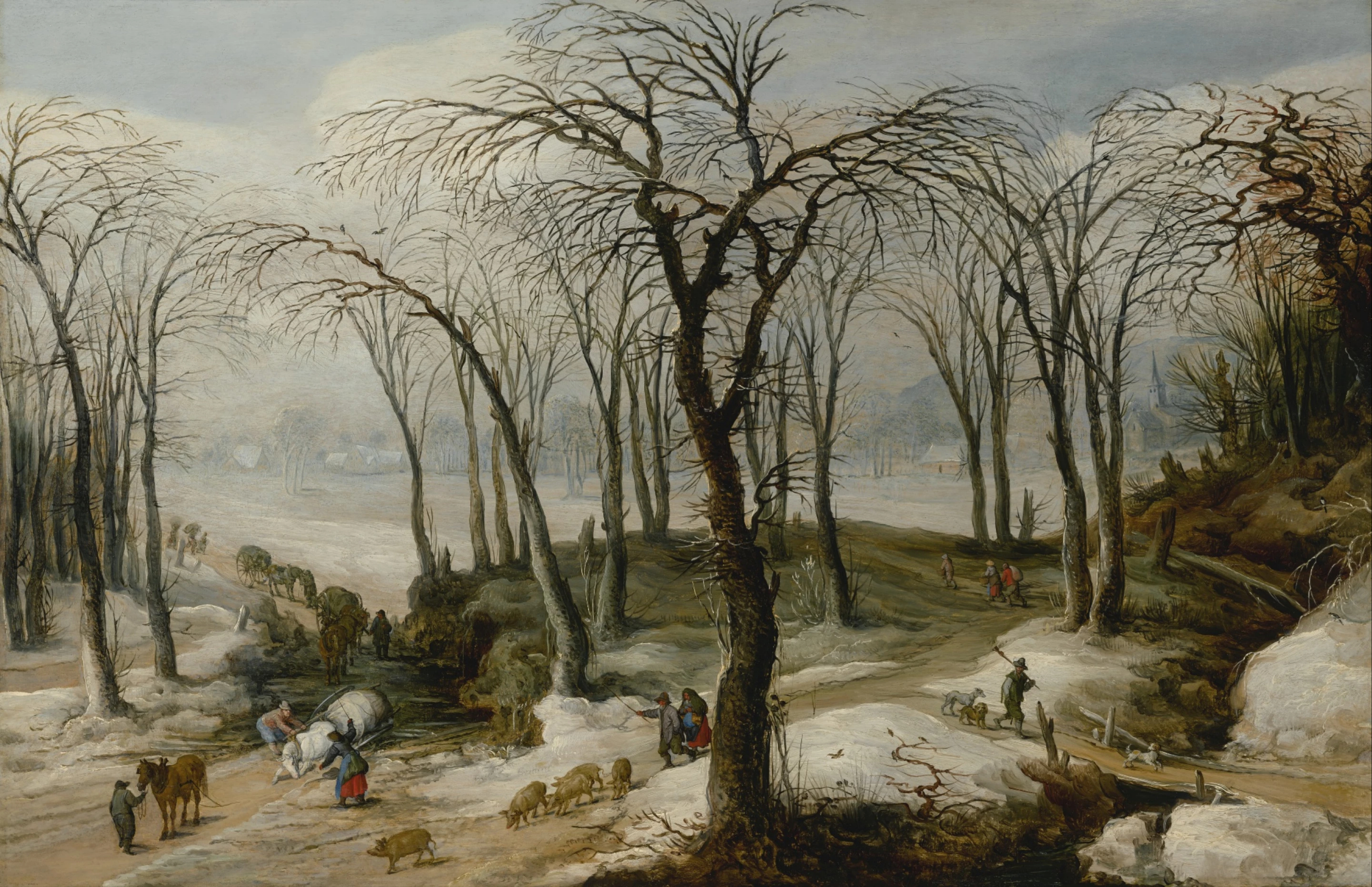
Winter landscape, with Joos de Momper (II)

Jan learned that his father had died on 13 January 1625 from cholera only after his return to Northern Italy in Turin. Wanting to return to Antwerp immediately, he had to delay his departure for 16 days due to a severe fever. After recovering from his illness, he set off for his homeland by way of France. In Paris he met the Antwerp art dealer and painter Peter Goetkint the Younger, who was the son of Peter Goetkint the Elder, the master of Jan's father. Goetkint was eager to return to Antwerp because his wife was expected to deliver a baby soon. The child was born on 25 August, the day on which Jan Breughel arrived in Antwerp with his travelling companion who died a few days later. Jan took over the management of his father's workshop, sold the finished works of his father and finished some of his father's unfinished paintings. In the Guild year 1624–1625, Jan became a master painter of the Guild of Saint Luke of Antwerp.

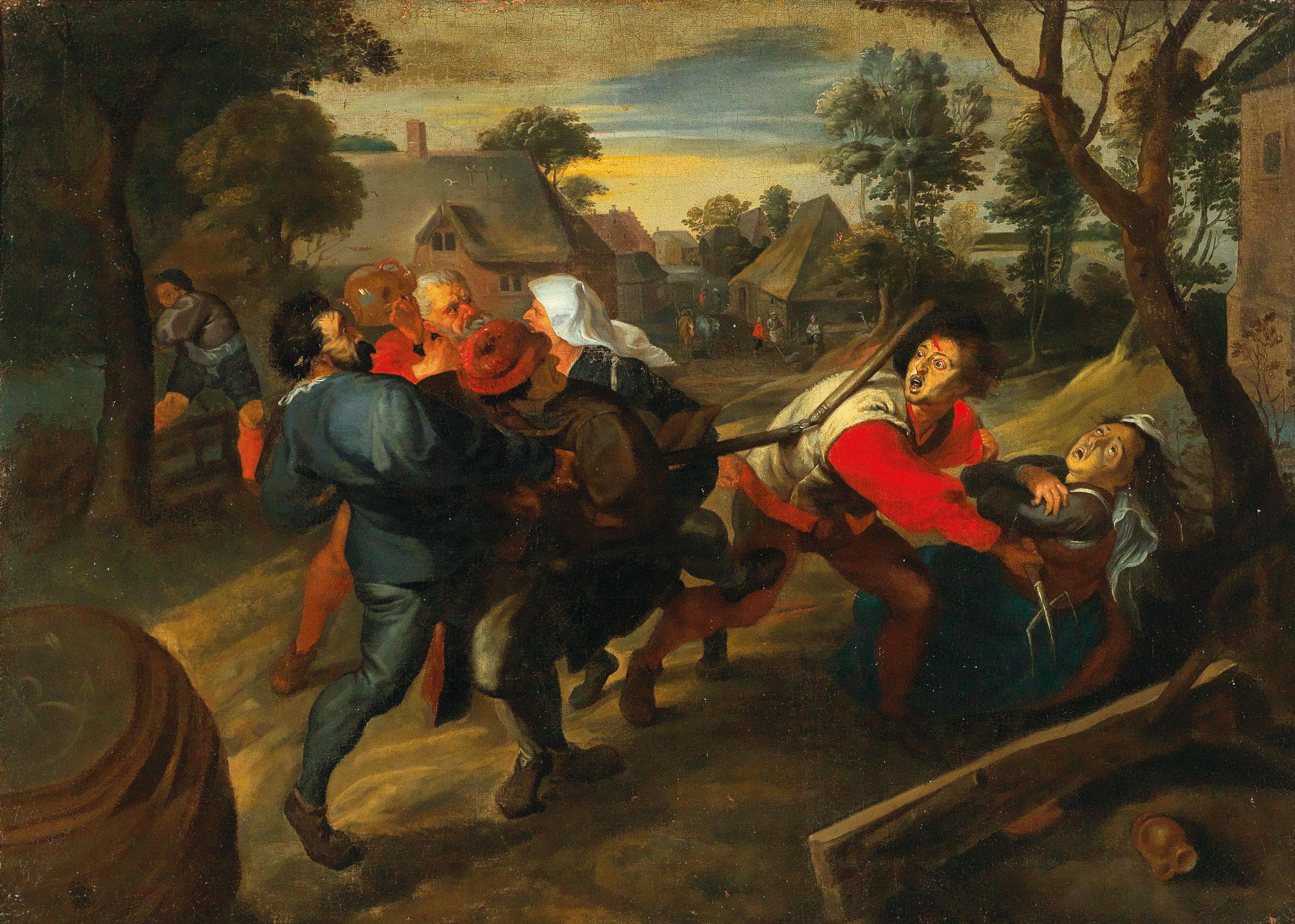
Fight between Peasants

In 1626 he married Anna Maria Janssens, daughter of Abraham Janssens, a prominent history painter in Antwerp. He continued to operate the large workshop of his father. In 1630 he became dean of the Guild of Saint Luke, and was commissioned by the French court to paint a series of paintings of the biblical character Adam. It seems that his studio declined after this period and that he started to paint smaller scale paintings which commanded lower prices than those produced earlier.

He worked independently in Paris in the 1650s and produced paintings for the Austrian court in 1651. He is recorded again in Antwerp in 1657 where he remained for the remainder of his life . During a meeting of the Antwerp Guild of St Luke held on 8 October 1672, he got into a heated argument with Peter van Brekeveldt, another former dean of the guild, who injured him in an eye. As this injury affected his ability to paint, he sued van Brekeveldt for indemnification. He died on 1 September 1678 at his home address on the Pruymenstraat in Antwerp.

His pupils included his older sons Abraham, Philips and Jan Peeter, his nephew Jan van Kessel, and his younger brother Ambrosius.

== Work ==
=== General ===
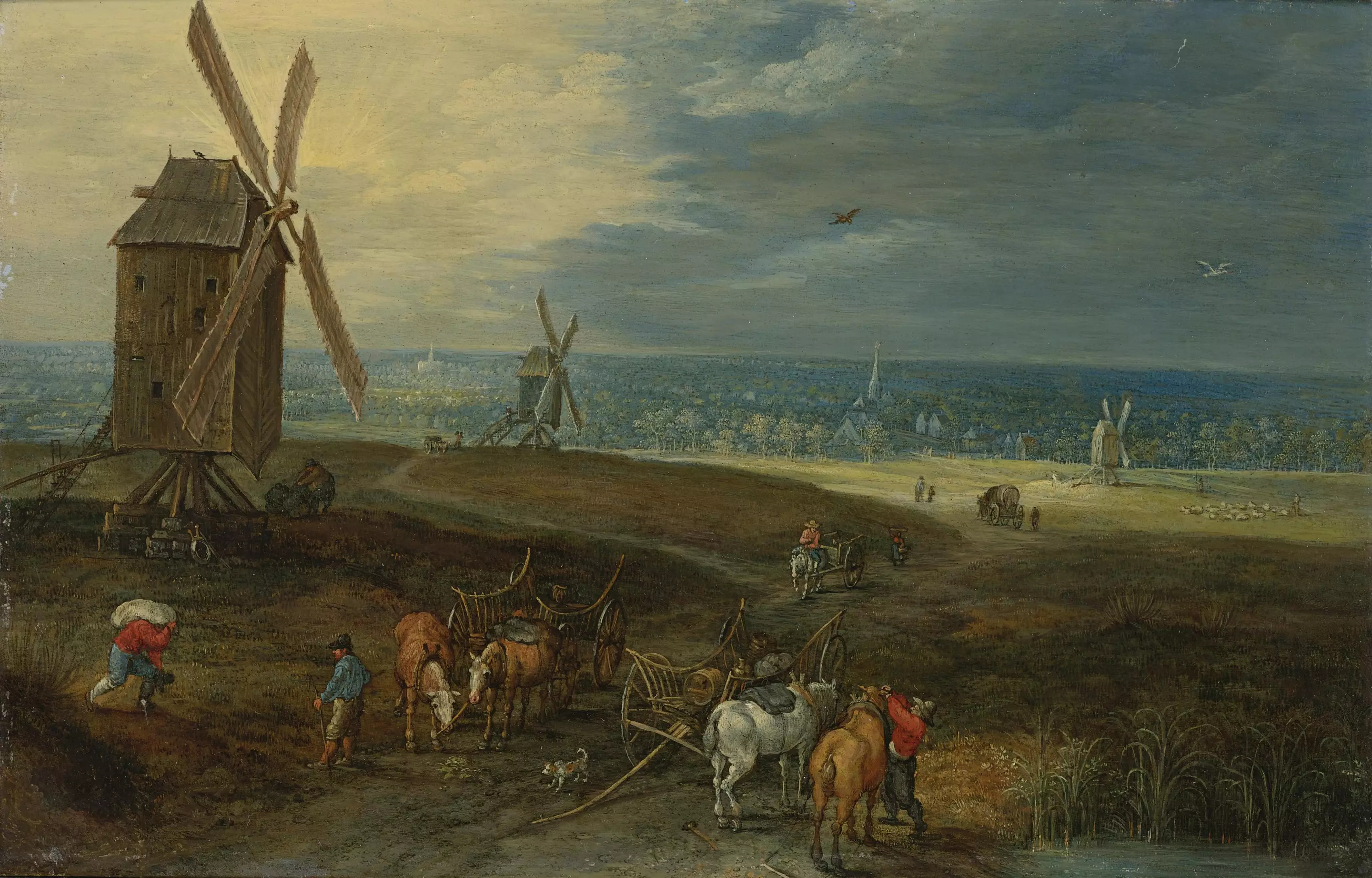
Extensive Landscape with Travellers Before a Windmill

Taking over his father's workshop at an early age, he painted the same subjects as his father in a style which was similar to that of his father. About 340 paintings have been attributed to him. His repertoire included history paintings, allegorical and mythological scenes, landscapes and seascapes, hunting pieces, village scenes, battle scenes and scenes of hellfire and the underworld. Unlike his father, he did not paint many flower still lifes. Like his father and uncle, he would also reinterpret the genre and landscape paintings of his grandfather Pieter Brueghel the Elder. An example is the Fight between Peasants (Dorotheum Vienna 30 April 2019, lot 383), which goes back to a now lost painting of his grandfather, which was likely in the collection of his father and of which a print exists. Whereas in the print after Pieter Brueghel the Elder the viewer looks at the scene a 'spectator from a raised stage', in Jan Brueghel the Younger's version the viewer is more involved due to the lower viewpoint. Jan de Younger further created a new painting category of animals in landscapes. After the death of his father he changed his signature from 'Brueghel' to 'Breughel'.

While he did not surpass his father in the quality of his output, his early works can hardly be distinguished from those of his father in terms of their high level of execution. He gradually was able to break away from his father's style by developing a broader, more painterly, and less structured manner of painting.

=== Landscapes ===
He painted a wide variety of landscapes including: landscapes of woods, rivers and harbours, villages, cityscapes, architectural views with figures, veduti, hell scenes, landscapes with the Holy Family, paradise landscapes and allegorical landscapes. These landscapes show his father's influence although he would develop some personal touches in his later career. His best works are his wide landscapes, which he produced on his own or in collaboration with other painters such as Hendrick van Balen the Elder and Joos de Momper. During his career, he collaborated with many other artists such as Jan van Balen - the son of his father's collaborator Hendrick van Balen the Elder, Pieter de Lierner, Adriaen Stalbemt, Lucas Van Uden, his brother-in-law David Teniers the Younger, his father-in-law Abraham Janssens, Sebastiaen Vrancx, Denijs van Alsloot and Hendrik de Clerck. In view of the strong demand for large decorative landscapes at the time, Jan the Younger would sometimes have his father's works copied in his workshop and then sell them under his father's signature. In the wide landscapes he often reprised compositions of his father but executed them in a different palette. Among his veduta paintings can be counted a View of the palace of Brussels with Archdukes Albert and Isabella (c. 1627, Museo del Prado) executed in collaboration with Sebastiaen Vrancx.

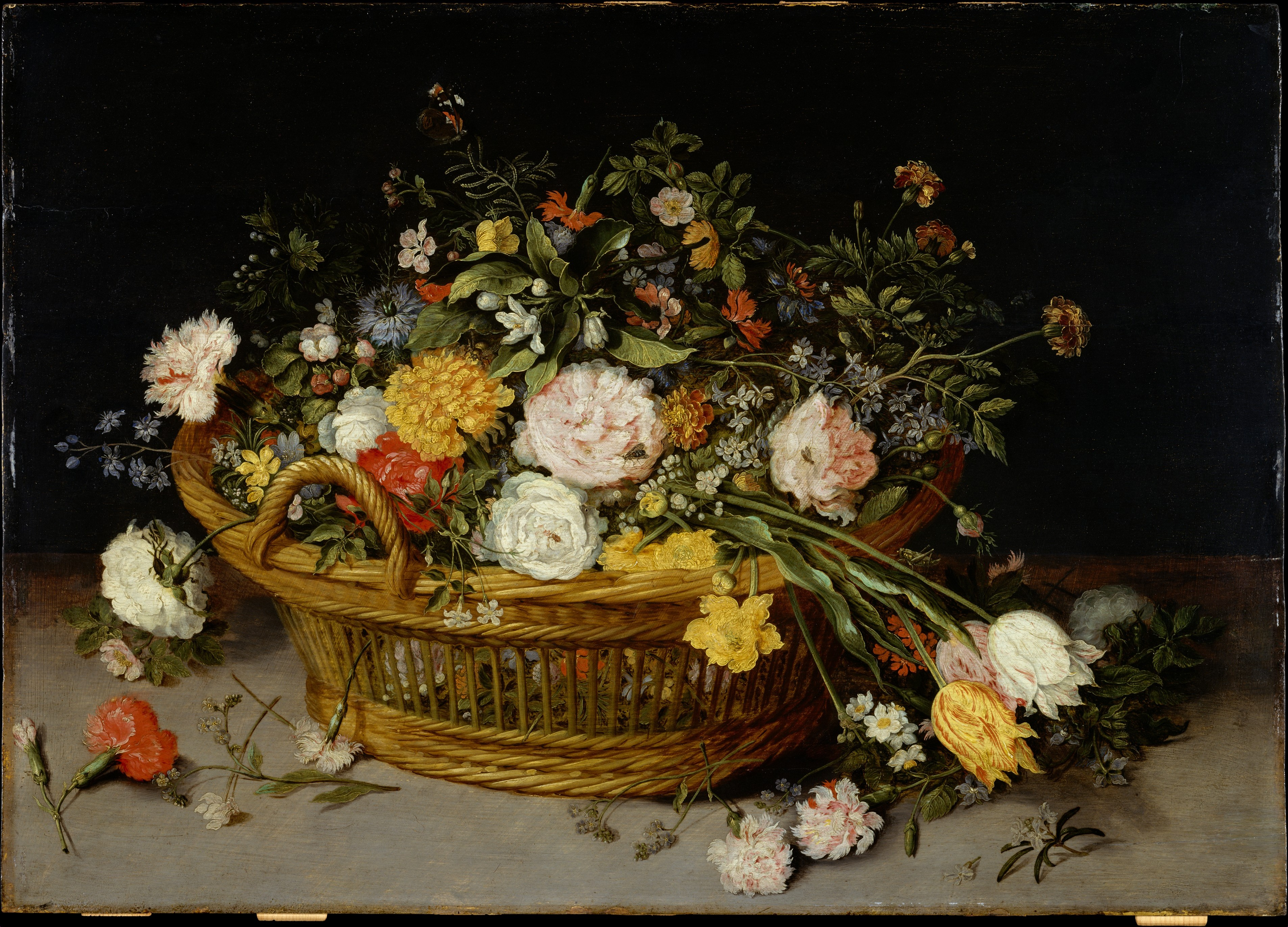
Basket of Flowers

In his village landscapes Jan initially followed his father's precedent and gradually developed his own idiom in the 1640s.

=== Still lifes ===
A less prolific flower painter than his father, he was inspired by his father's works on which he produced his variations. His flower pieces are usually executed on a smaller scale and are less compact, slimmer and less detailed.

His father had created the new still life category of garland paintings, a special type of still life developed in Antwerp along with other artists such as Hendrick van Balen the Elder, Frans Francken the Younger, Peter Paul Rubens and Daniel Seghers. These paintings typically show a flower garland around a devotional image or portrait. This genre was initially inspired by the cult of veneration and devotion to Mary prevalent at the Habsburg court (then the rulers over the Southern Netherlands) and in Antwerp generally. Jan also painted various garland paintings in collaboration with other artists. They show the influence of Daniel Seghers. An example is the Nicolaas de Man in the grounds of his country estate in which the portrait was painted by Jan Thomas van Ieperen and the landscape by Lucas van Uden (Christie's London auction of 6 December 2018 lot 26).

=== Allegorical paintings ===
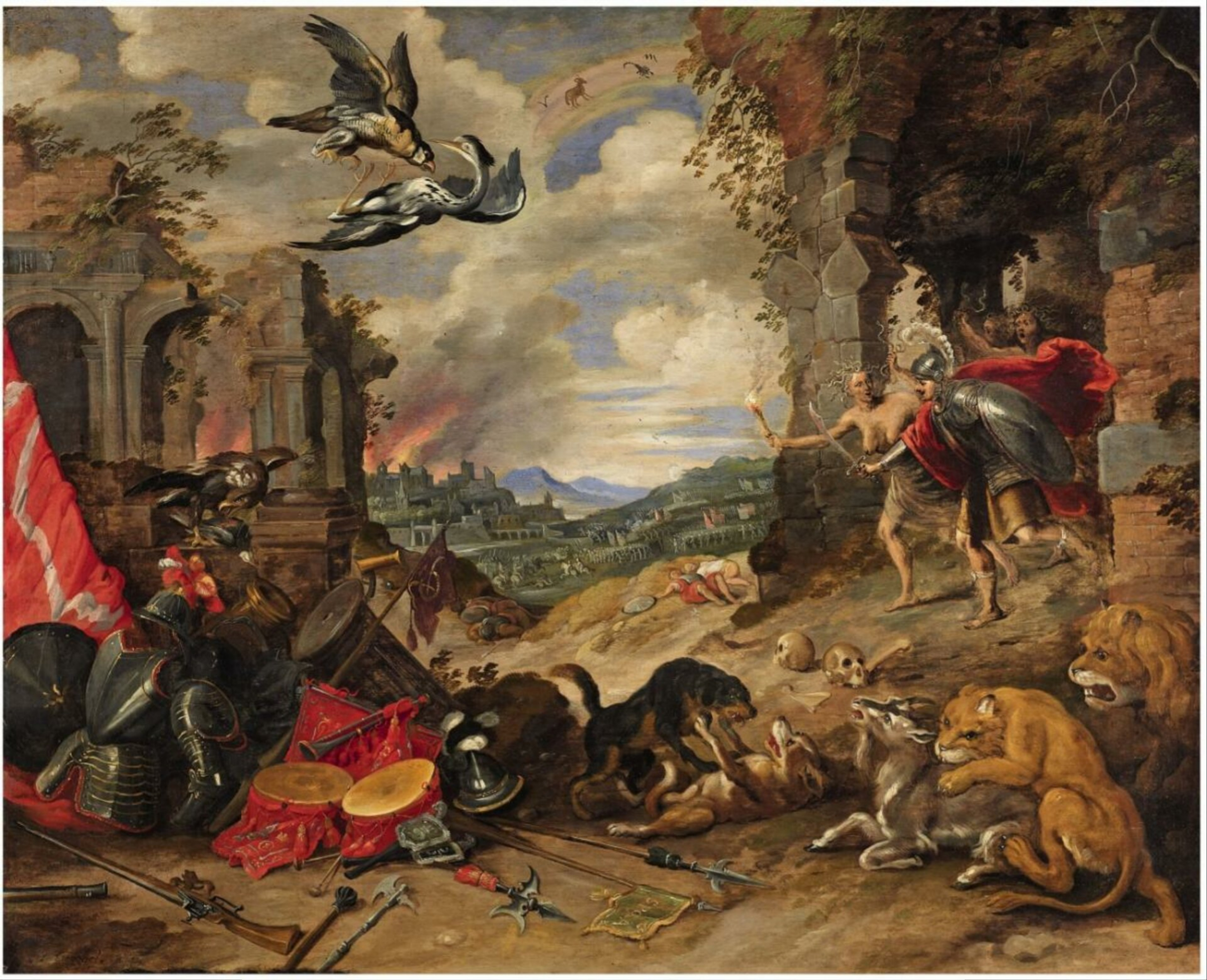
Allegory of War

Like his father, Jan the Elder produced various sets of allegorical paintings, in particular on the themes of the Five senses, the Four Elements. These paintings were often collaborations with other painters such as is the case with the five paintings representing the Five senses on which Brueghel and Pieter van Avont collaborated and of which an Allegory of Smell was auctioned at Dorotheum on 18 December 2017. Another recurring allegorical theme also treated by his father is Abundance. An example is the Allegory of abundance (c. 1624, Museo del Prado'') in which fertility is represented by a six-breasted figure at the centre of the composition.

He gradually developed his own themes and style for his allegorical subjects. From the 1640s he created complex allegories dealing with subjects such as the horrors of war and the benefits of commerce, the arts and science. In particular the subject of the horrors of war occupied Jan Brueghel in the 1640s, when Europe was emerging from the Thirty Years' War. The long-hoped-for end of the war was achieved by the Peace of Westphalia in 1648. A work made against this background is the Allegory of war (Lempertz 16 November 2013, Cologne Lot 1243). The work is full of symbols of war and strife such as weapons, fighting animals, zodiac symbols of bad luck in the heavens, the furies, a burning city, the god of war and the battling troops in the background which all evoke the theme of the horrors of war. In these mature works Jan Brueghel the Younger distanced himself from his father's models to create his own visual language, reflecting the new art and mood of his time.

=== Singeries ===
Jan Breughel the Elder had contributed to the development of the genre of the 'monkey scene', also called 'singerie' (a word, which in French means a 'comical grimace, behaviour or trick'). Comical scenes with monkeys appearing in human attire and a human environment are a pictorial genre that was initiated in Flemish painting in the 16th century and was subsequently further developed in the 17th century. Monkeys appear in medieval cathedral sculpture as symbols of evil, while in Renaissance art they were a personification of man. Monkeys were regarded as shameless and impish creatures and excellent imitators of human behaviour. These depictions of monkeys enacting various human roles were a playful metaphor for all the folly in the world. Painters could use the figure of the monkey to express moral judgement and dubious traits of human behaviour.

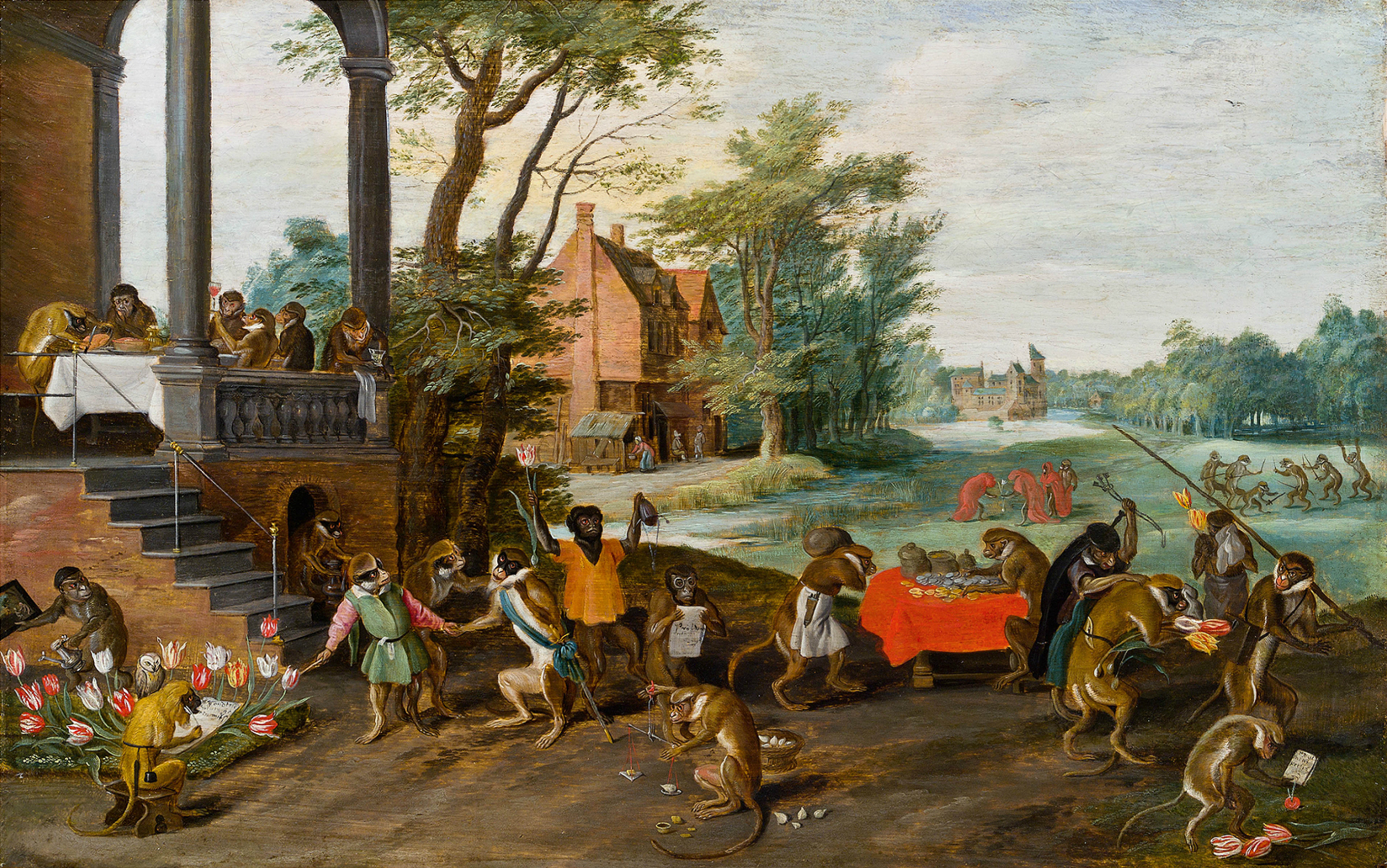
Allegory of the Tulipomania

The Flemish engraver Pieter van der Borcht introduced singeries as an independent theme around 1575 through a series of prints, which were strongly embedded in the artistic tradition of Pieter Bruegel the Elder. These prints were widely disseminated causing the theme to be picked up by other Flemish artists. The Antwerp artist Frans Francken the Younger was the first one to do so. He was quickly followed by Jan Brueghel the Elder, Sebastiaen Vrancx and Jan van Kessel the Elder. Jan Brueghel the Elder's son-in-law David Teniers the Younger later became the principal practitioner of the genre and developed it further with his younger brother Abraham Teniers. Later in the 17th century Nicolaes van Verendael painted these 'monkey scenes' as well.

Jan Brueghel the Younger also practised this genre. An example is his Allegory of Tulipomania or Satire of Tulipomania of which he painted at least four versions, of which three place the scene outdoors and one situates it in a loggia. The painting mocks the obsession of Dutch society with the trade and speculation in tulips. A lively trade in tulips and tulip bulbs had developed in the Dutch Republic with prices rising to unprecedented levels. Speculation was rife, resulting in big profits and big losses. Brueghel's Satire of Tulipomania pokes fun at the tulip traders. The version in the Frans Hals Museum in Haarlem shows monkeys negotiating, weighing bulbs, counting money and handling administrative tasks. The monkey on the left holds a list of bulb prices. On the right, a monkey is urinating on tulips, thus mocking this tulip mania.

== Gallery ==
Selected works

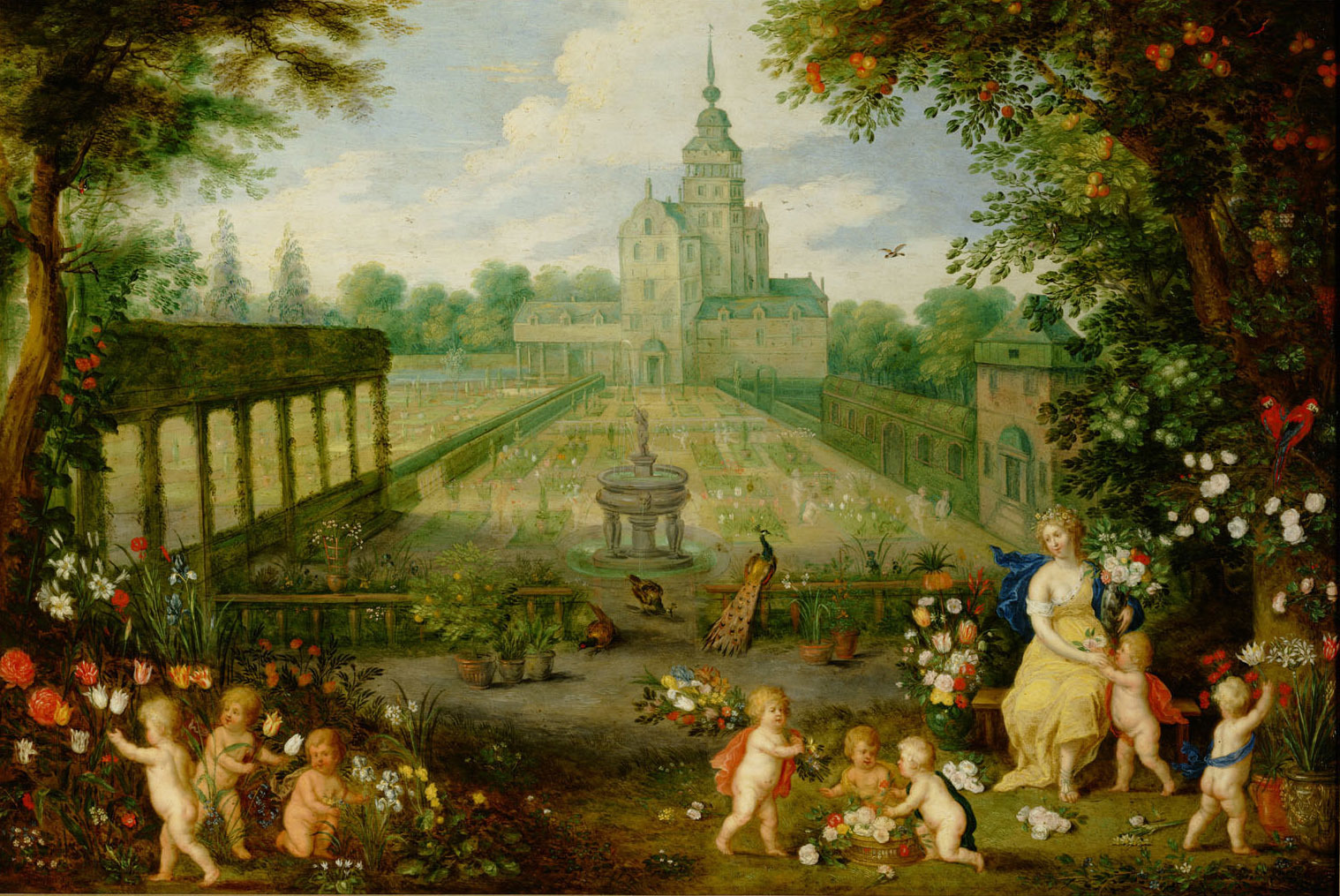
Flora in the Garden, c. 1630, Kunsthistorisches Museum

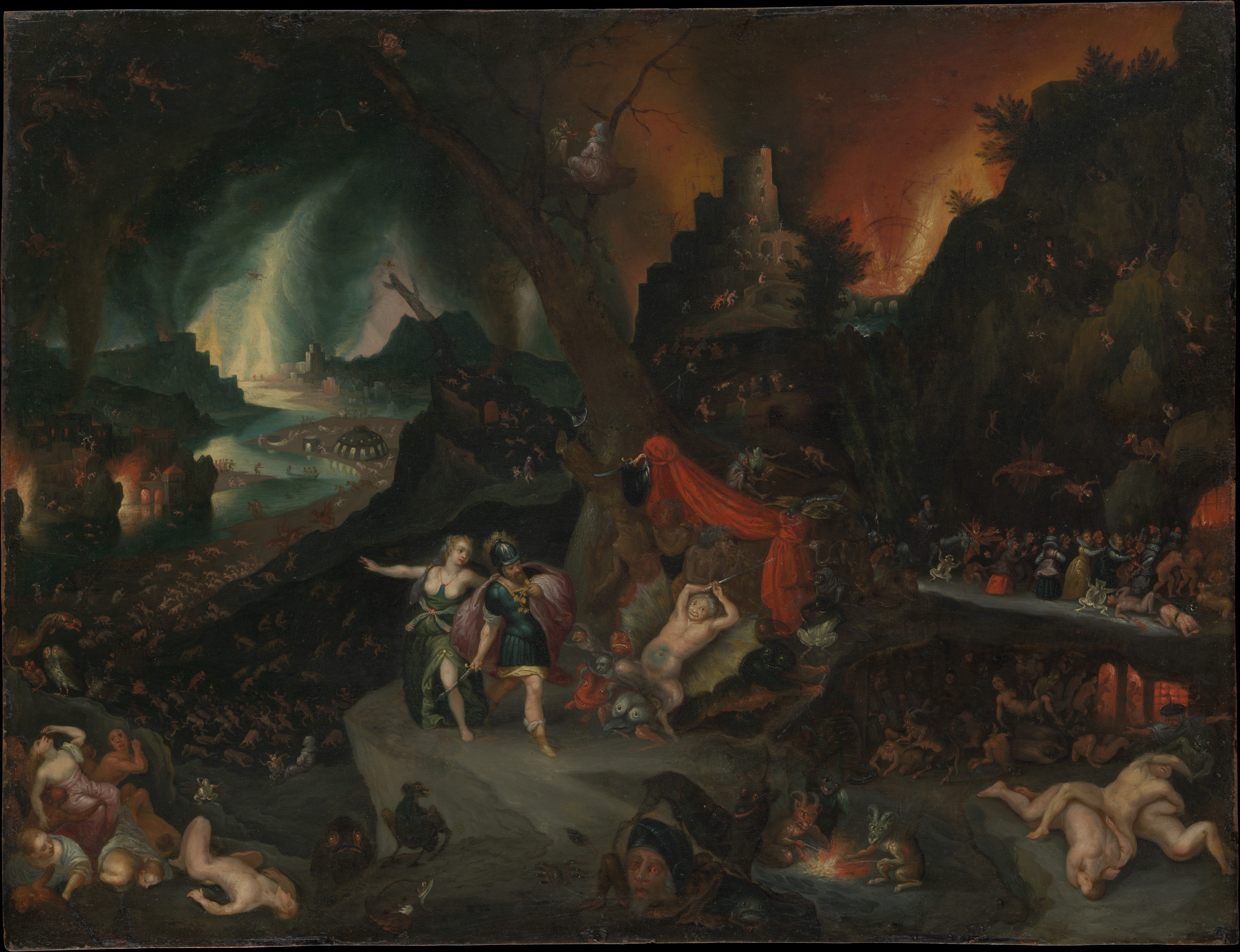
Aeneas and the Sibyl in the Underworld, c. 1630, Metropolitan Museum of Art

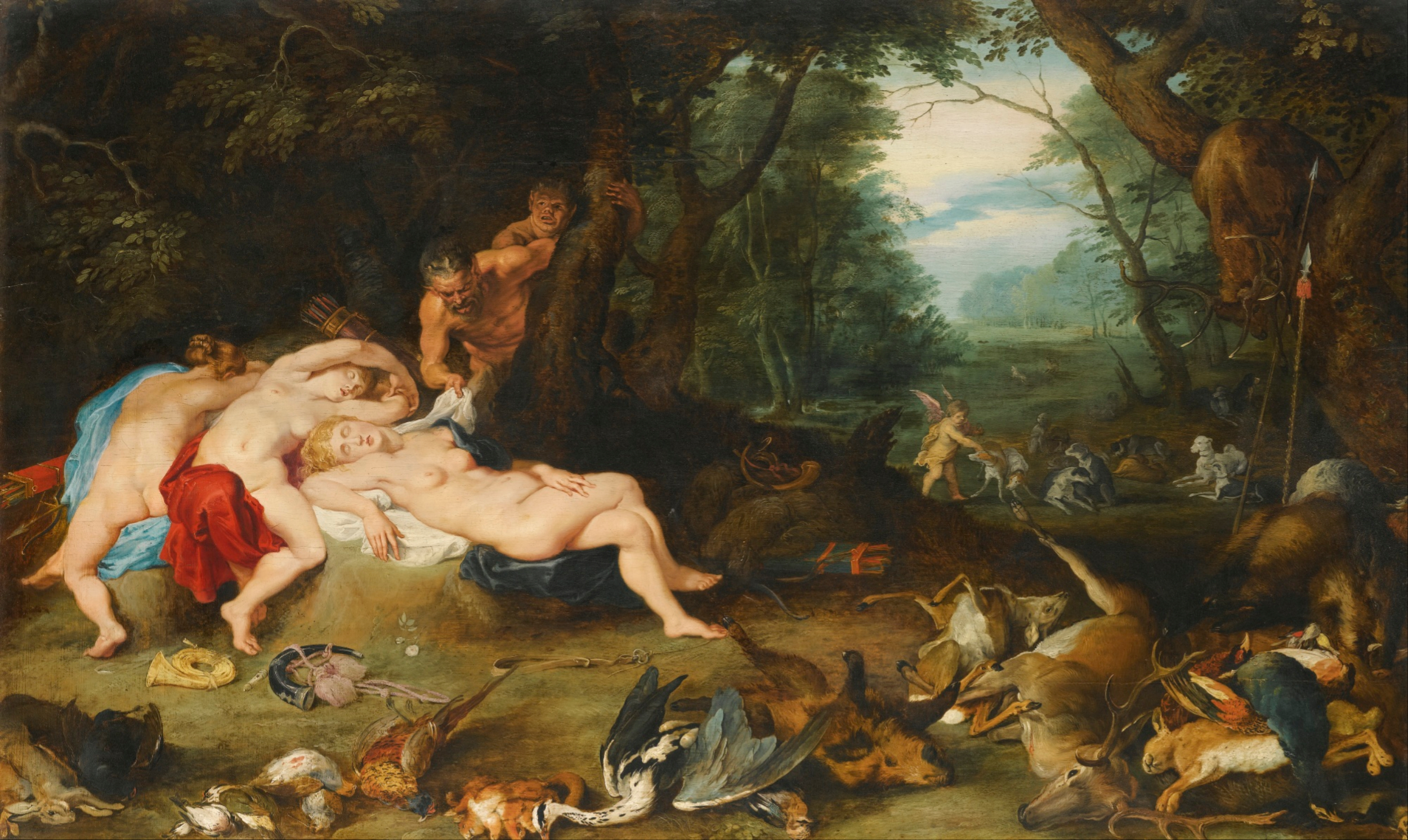
Landscape with Diana and her Nymphs, figures by workshop of Rubens

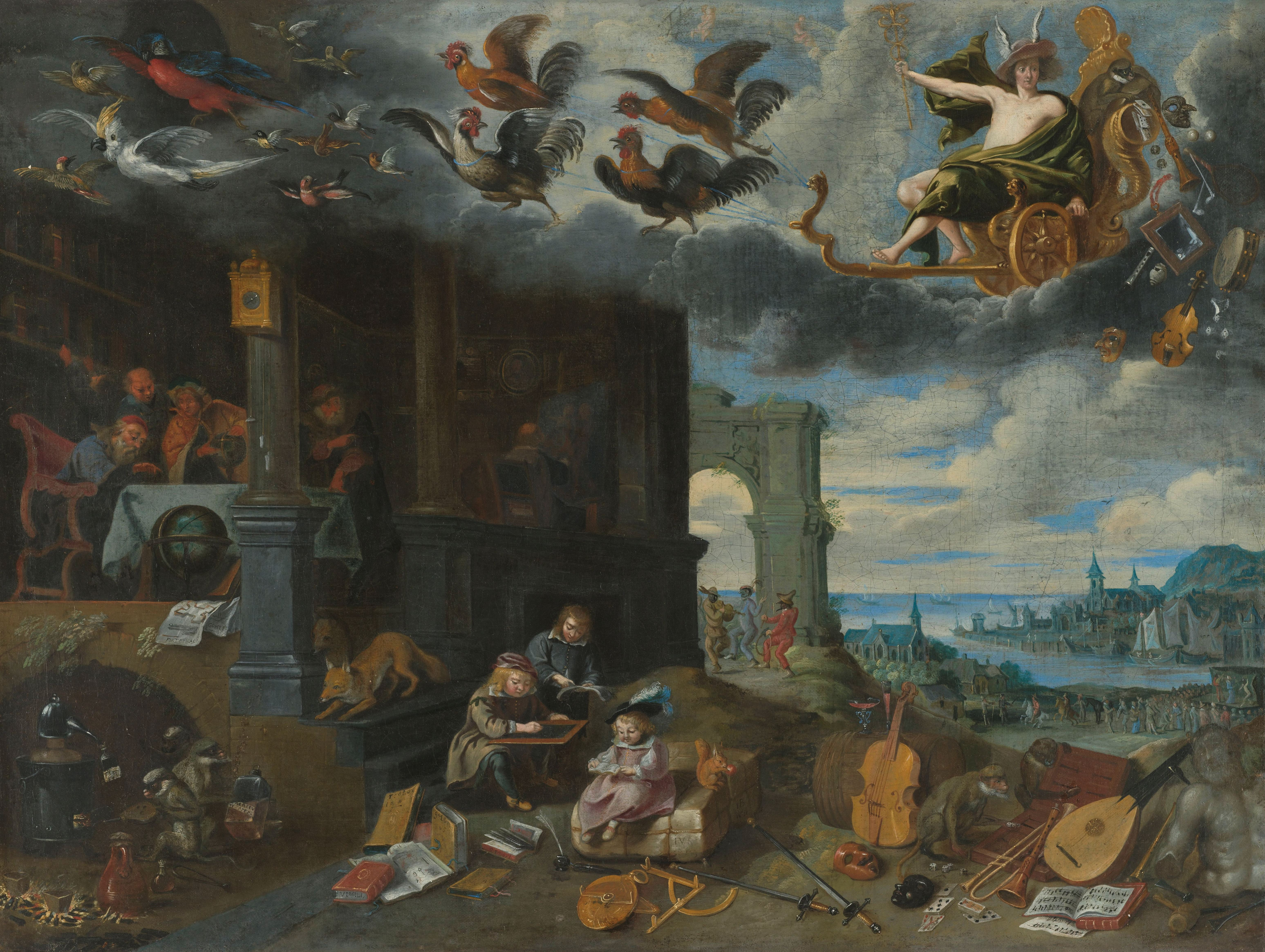
The apotheosis of commerce and science, 1640s, Rijksmuseum

== Family tree ==
Brueghel family tree

Pieter Bruegel the Elder
Pieter Brueghel the Younger	Jan Brueghel the Elder
Ambrosius Brueghel	Jan Brueghel the Younger	Anna Brueghel x David Teniers the Younger	Paschasia Brueghel	Hieronymous van Kessel the Younger
Jan Pieter Brueghel	Abraham Brueghel	Jan Baptist Brueghel	Jan van Kessel the Elder
