= David Teniers III =

Flemish painter and tapestry designer (1638–1685)

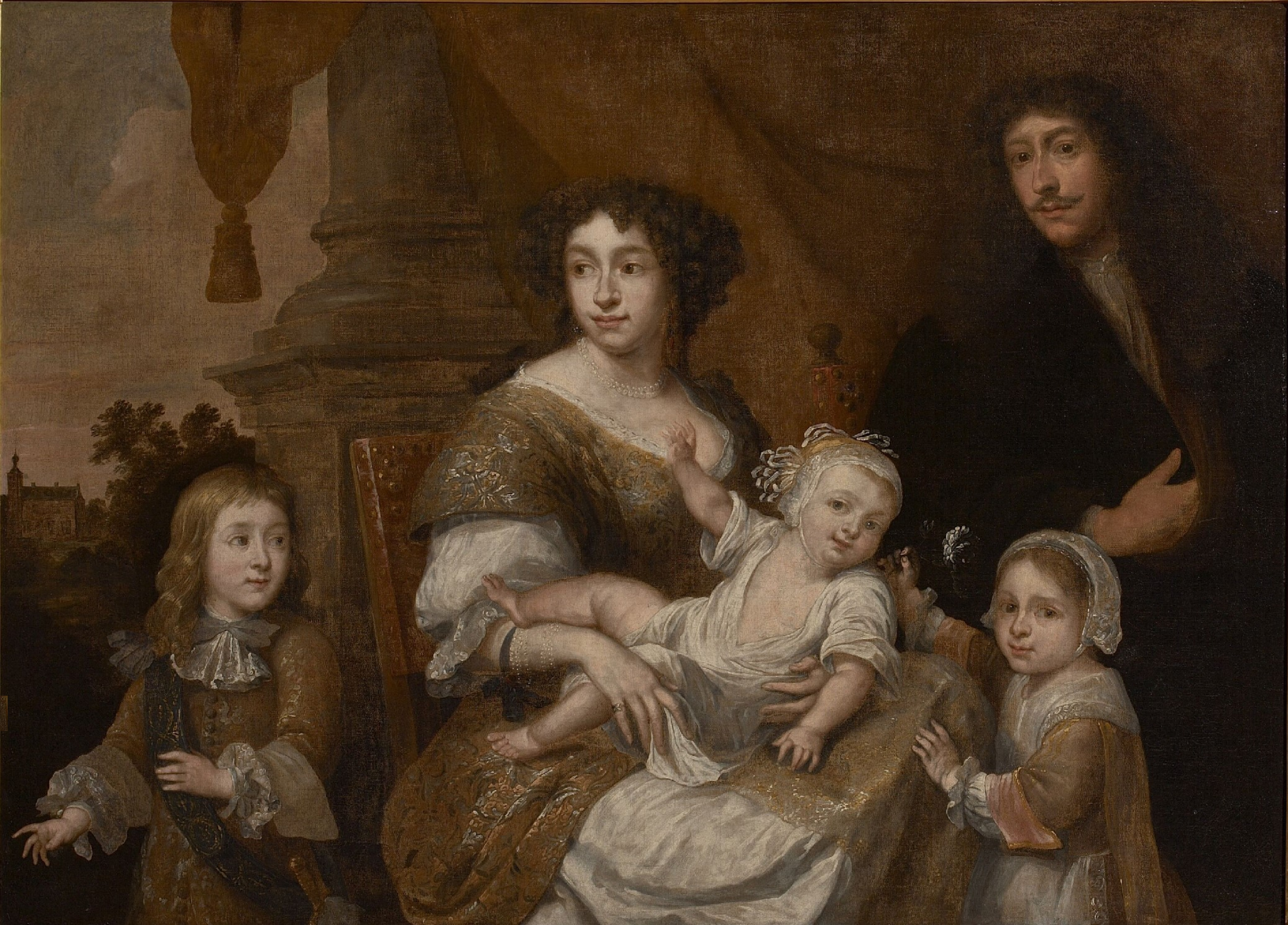
The family of David Teniers III by Juliaen Teniers the Younger

David Teniers III, also referred to as David Teniers Junior (baptized 10 July 1638 – 2 October 1685) was a Flemish painter and tapestry designer who was mainly active in Antwerp, Madrid and Brussels. He is known for his portraits, religious compositions and genre scenes.

== Life ==
David Teniers III was born in Antwerp where he was baptized on 10 July in the St. James' Church. He was a scion of two very prominent artist families from Antwerp: his father was the painter David Teniers the Younger and his mother was Anna Brueghel, the daughter of Jan Brueghel the Elder and granddaughter of Pieter Bruegel the Elder. His grandfather was the painter David Teniers the Elder. His father had close links with Peter Paul Rubens as is demonstrated by the fact that Rubens' second wife Helena Fourment was David III's god-mother.

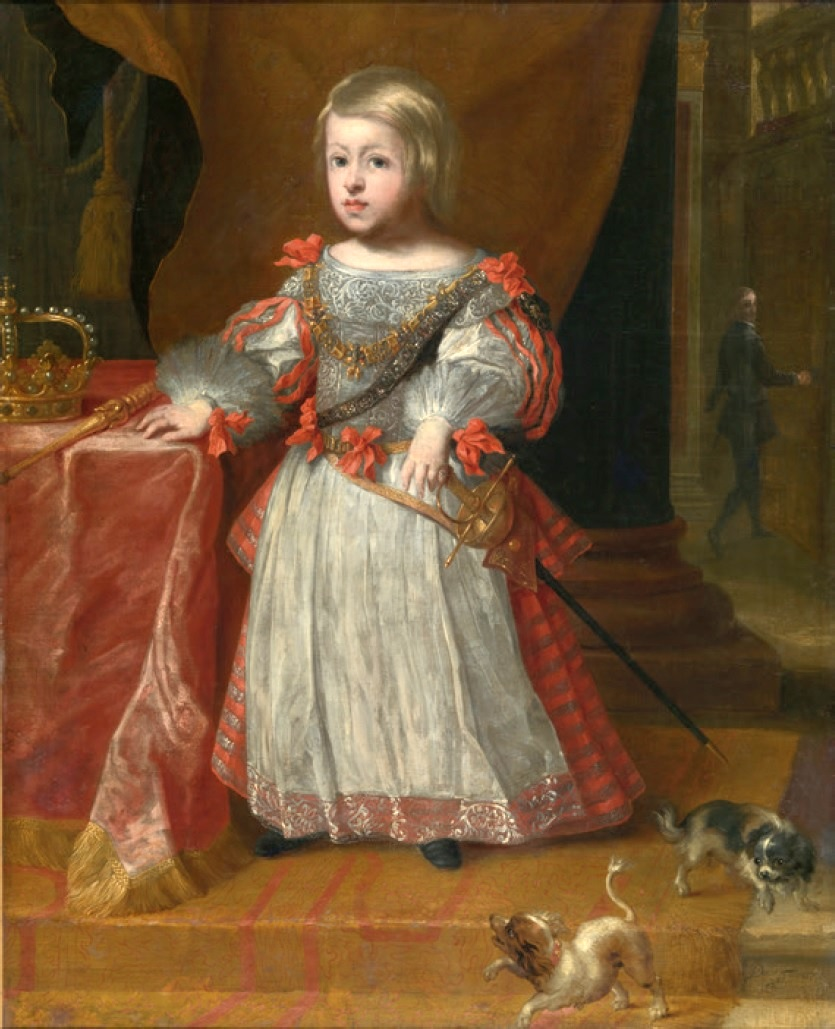
Childhood portrait of Charles II of Spain

When his father was called to the court in Brussels around 1650 to become court painter to Archduke Leopold Wilhelm of Austria, the family Teniers moved from Antwerp to Brussels. Originally destined for an ecclesiastical career, David III showed such an aptitude for drawing and painting as a collaborator of his father that he chose to become a painter. David III's mother died on 11 May 1656 and his father remarried on 21 October of the same year to Isabella de Fren, the 32-year-old daughter of Andries de Fren, secretary of the Council of Brabant.

His father sent him to Madrid in 1661 with a letter of recommendation from Luis de Benavides Carrillo, Marquis of Caracena, then governor of the Southern Netherlands. He left on 26 April 1661. He was active in Spain as a designer of cartoons for tapestries and as a portrait painter. He remained at the court of Philip IV of Spain until 1663. The Spanish king bestowed upon him the honorary title of gentleman of the artillery of His Majesty.

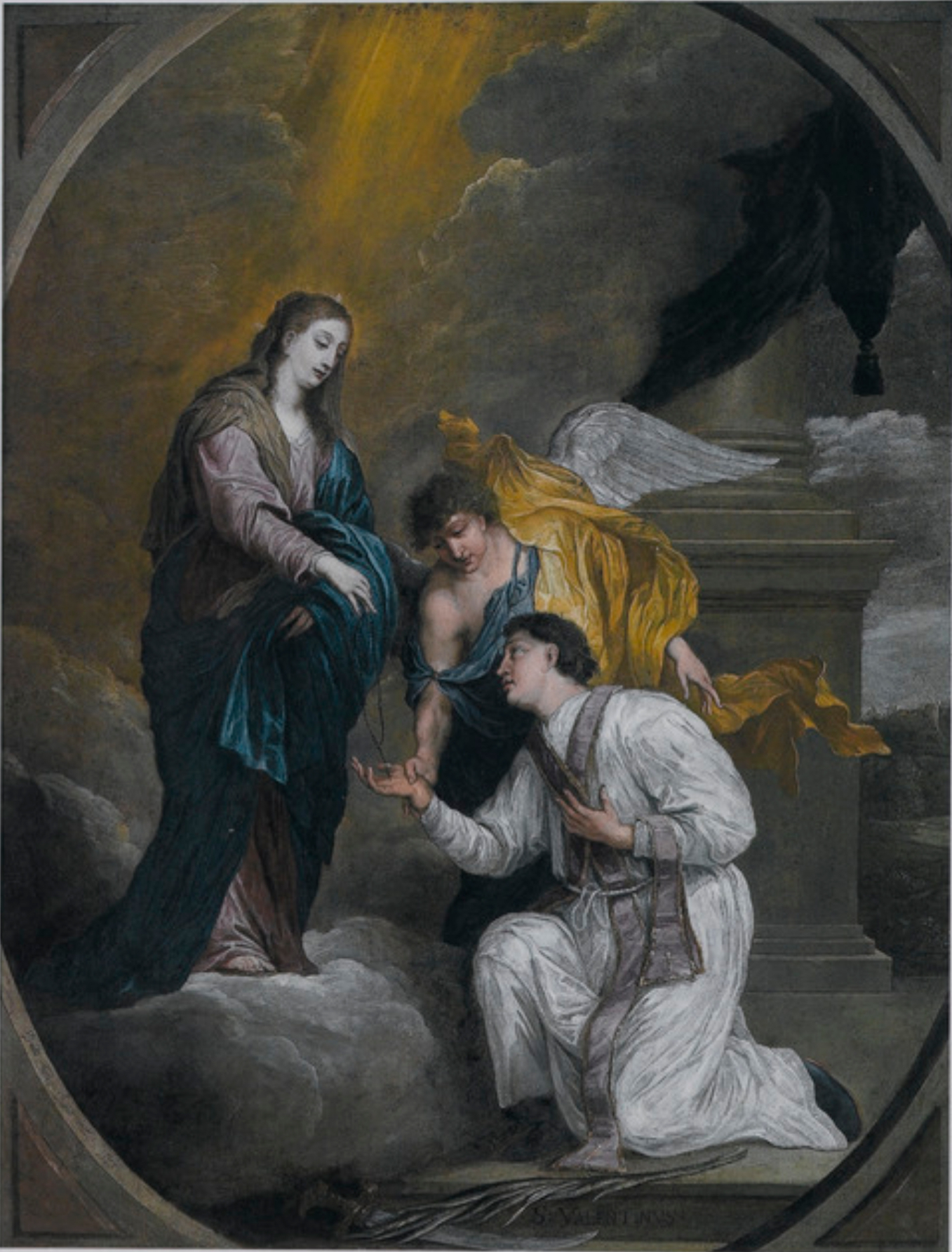
St Valentine receiving a rosary from the hands of the Virgin

Upon his return to Flanders he married Ana María Bonnaerens on 4 August 1671 in Dendermonde. His wife was from a wealthy bourgeois family from Dendermonde. The couple had six children of whom the eldest, David Teniers IV (1672–1731), appears to have been yet another painter in the dynasty. David Teniers III kept a record of his household's incomings and outgoings, which has been preserved and carries the title Handtboeck daer in staedt gespecificeert alle goederen ende gronden van erven, renten ende obligatiën, competerende aen d' Heer david teniers ende myne Huysvrouw, J. Anna Maria Bonnarens, die getrouwt zyn den 4. Augustus, 1671 (Manual in which are specified all assets and funds inheritances, annuities and obligations belonging to Mr. David Teniers and his housewife Anne-Marie Bonnarens, who married on 4 August 1671). It contains information about the household of the artist, which has been helpful in establishing some of the facts of his life.

He initially stayed at his father's country estate and collaborated with his father on various projects. He seems to have been unhappy with his share in the payments received for some of their collaborative works. After settling in Brussels in 1675, he entered the local Guild of Saint Luke. He received Flemish as well as Spanish pupils including Frans Jochin, Lodewyk van der Vinne, Cascarillo and Jan van Diest.

He died in Brussels on 2 October 1685.

== Work ==
David Teniers III painted portraits, genre scenes and religious compositions. He is stylistically close to the elegance of Anthony van Dyck or Gonzales Coques but remained thematically closer to the genre scenes painted by his father and grandfather.

David Teniers III was also sought after as a designer of tapestries. His main contribution here is the cartoons for genre scenes executed in the family tradition for tapestries, which were woven in the workshops of Brussels and Lille.

The Museo del Prado holds a series of works that have been attributed to him as well as several signed copies realized in 1673 after sketches of Rubens for a series of tapestries destined for the Monastery of the Convent of Las Descalzas Reales in Madrid.
