= Anna Brueghel =

Brabant painter (1620–1656)

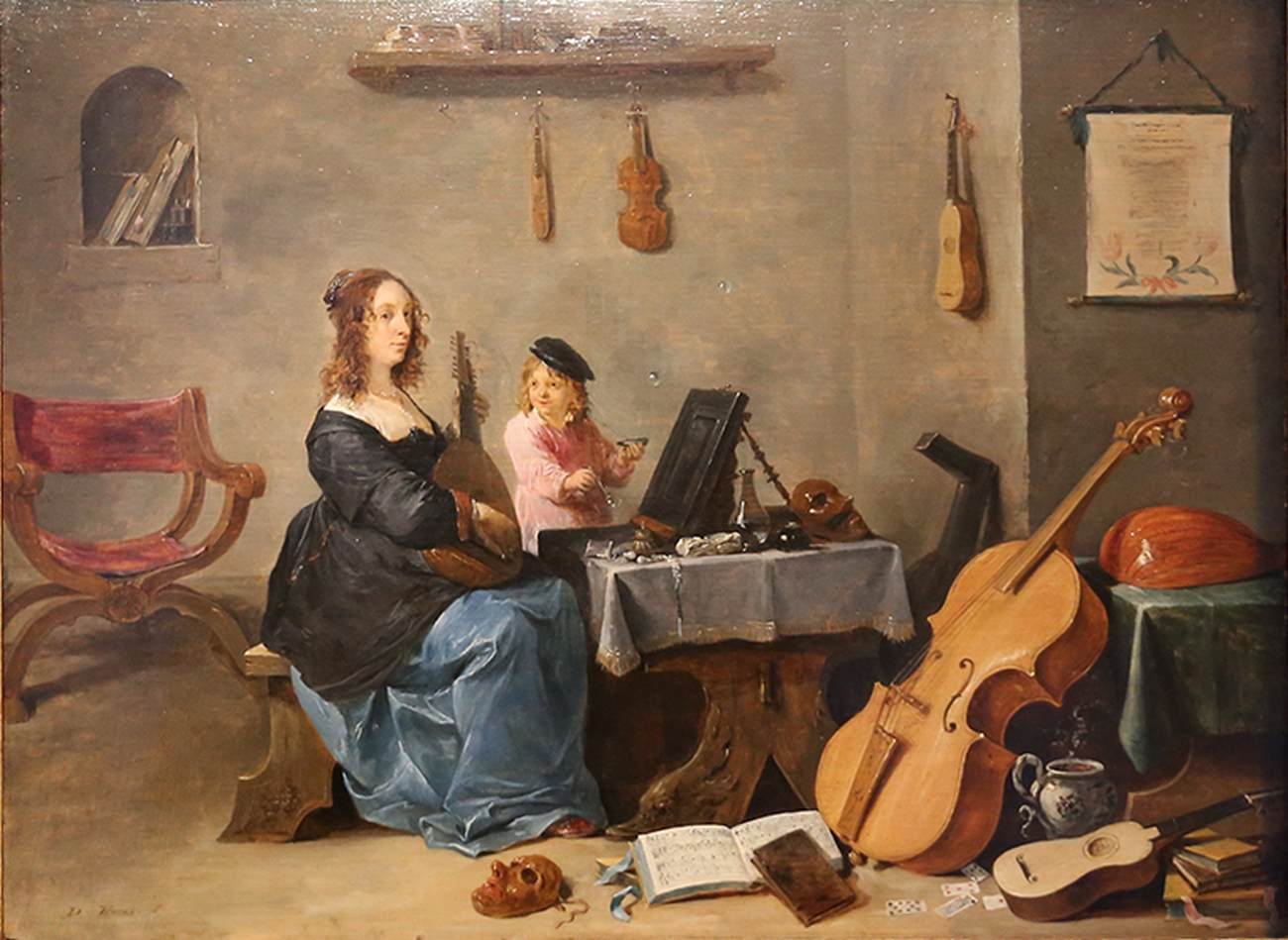
- "Portrait of Anna Brueghel and her son David Teniers III" (circa 1645) by David Teniers II
- Born: 4 October 1620; Antwerp, Duchy of Brabant (now Belgium)
- Died: 11 May 1656 (aged 35); Brussels, Duchy of Brabant (now Belgium)
- Resting place: Church of St. James on Coudenberg
- Other names: Anna Teniers
- Occupations: Painter, artists model
- Spouse: David Teniers II (m. 1637–)
- Children: 8
- Father: Jan Brueghel the Elder
- Relatives: Pieter Bruegel the Elder (paternal grandfather)
- Family: Brueghel family

Anna Brueghel (4 October 1620 – 11 May 1656) was a Flemish painter from Brabant, none of whose work is known to have been preserved. She was the daughter of Jan Brueghel the Elder, and the wife of David Teniers II. She also went by the name Anna Teniers.

== Biography ==
Anna Brueghel was born on 4 October 1620 in Antwerp (now Belgium). She was the daughter of Jan Breughel the Elder and his second wife, Catharina van Mariënborch. After her father's death in 1625, Anna Brueghel was a ward of Peter Paul Rubens.

In 1637, she married David Teniers II (also known as David Teniers the Younger). Together they had eight children. She would act as the artists model for many of Teniers' portraits of witches. Around 1650, the family moved to Brussels because Teniers became a court painter.

She died on 11 May 1656, in Brussels, and was buried in the Church of St. James on Coudenberg.

== Children ==
With her husband David Teniers II, Anna Brueghel had eight children:

- David Teniers III (baptized 10 July 1638–1685), married Anna Maria Bonnarens
- Cornelia Teniers (baptized 7 January 1640–1706), married to Jan Erasmus Quellinus
- Anna-Maria Teniers (baptized 19 January 1644–?)
- Clara Teniers (baptized 29 January 1646–?)
- Antoon Teniers (baptized 12 June 1648 –?)
- Anna Teniers (baptized 5 October 1651–?)
- Justinus Leopold Teniers (baptized 5 February 1653–18 September 1684)
- Anna Catharina Teniers (baptized 24 February 1655–1656)
