= Jan van Kessel =

Jan van Kessel may refer to one of the following 17th and 18th century painters:

- Jan van Kessel the Elder (1626–1679), a painter from Antwerp, specialized in flower and animal painting
- Jan van Kessel the Younger (1654–1708), his son, specialized in portraits
- 'the other' Jan van Kessel (c. 1620 – in or after 1661), a still life painter from Antwerp who moved to Amsterdam
- Jan van Kessel (Amsterdam) (1641–1680), a Dutch Golden Age landscape painter
- Jan Thomas van Kessel (1677–1741), a genre and portrait painter from Antwerp
- Pseudo-Jan van Kessel the Younger, the notname given to a still life artist or workshop active in Southern Europe in the late 16th and early 17th century
