= Van Kessel =

Van Kessel is a Dutch toponymic surname meaning "from/of Kessel". There are two towns Kessel in Belgium, two in The Netherlands, and one just across the border in Germany. It could also refer to the medieval County of Kessel with Kessel (Limburg) as its capital, or the extended Ambacht of Kessel that existed until 1675. Notable people with the surname include:

- Corné van Kessel (born 1991), Dutch cyclo-cross cyclist
- Ferdinand van Kessel (1648–1696), Flemish painter, son of Jan the Elder
- Gino van Kessel (born 1993), Curaçaoan footballer
- Henk van Kessel (born 1946), Dutch motorcycle racer
- Jan van Kessel (Amsterdam) (1641–1680), Dutch painter
- Jan van Kessel the Elder (1626–1679), Flemish painter
- Jan van Kessel the Younger (1654–1708), Flemish court painter in Spain, son of the above
- 'the other' Jan van Kessel (c.1620–1661), Flemish still life painter
- Jan Thomas van Kessel (1677–1741), a Flemish painter
- John Van Kessel (born 1969), Canadian ice hockey player
- Lieve van Kessel (born 1977), Dutch field hockey player
- Peter van Kessel (c. 1635–1668), Flemish still life painter
- Peter van Kessel (historian) (born 1933), Dutch historian
- Theodor van Kessel (1620 – 1696), Flemish engraver

== See also ==
- Kessel (surname)
- Van Dessel (disambiguation)
