= Kesel =

Kesel is a surname. Notable people with the surname include:

- Barbara Kesel (born 1960), American writer and editor of comic books
- Herbert Kesel (1931–2011), German rower
- Karl Kesel (born 1959), American comics writer and inker

== See also ==
- Kessel (surname)
