= Dessel (disambiguation) =

Dessel is a municipality located in the province of Antwerp, in Belgium.

Dessel may also refer to:

== Surname ==
- Cyril Dessel (born 1974), French professional road racing cyclist
- Elda Dessel (1925-2010), Argentine actress

== See also ==
- Van Dessel (disambiguation)
