= Peter van Kessel =

Flemish painter (c.1635–1668)

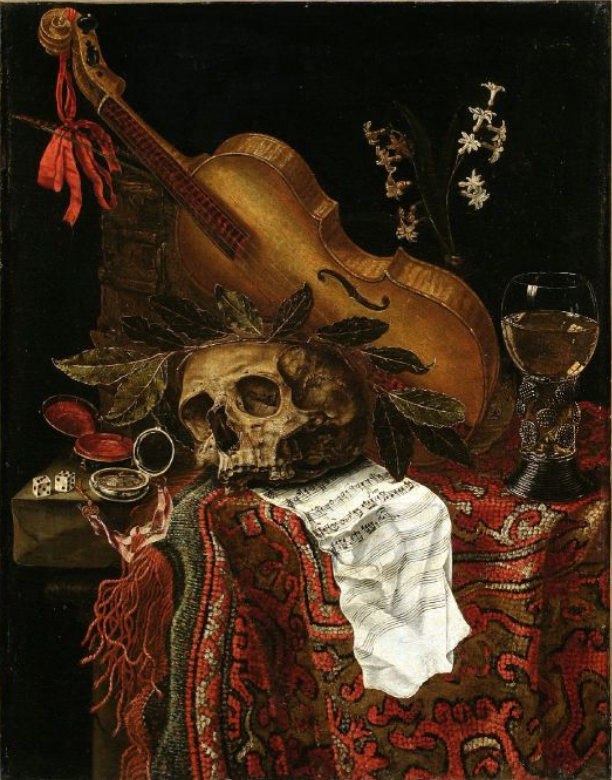
Vanitas still life

Peter van Kessel or Peeter van Kessel (Antwerp, c. 1635 – Ratzeburg, early October 1668) was a Flemish still life painter who worked in a number of sub-genres but is principally known for his flower pieces, game pieces, garland paintings and vanitas paintings. He trained in Antwerp but mainly worked abroad, and in particular in Northern Europe.

== Life ==
Little is known about the life and training of Peter van Kessel. He was likely born in Antwerp between 1630 and 1640. He is not mentioned in the records of the Guild of Saint Luke of Antwerp, which may indicate that he trained and later worked in the workshop of a family member who was a master of the guild. It is not clear whether he was related to the van Kessel family of still life painters, which was related to the Brueghel family of artists. The earliest known work by the artist dates from 1658.

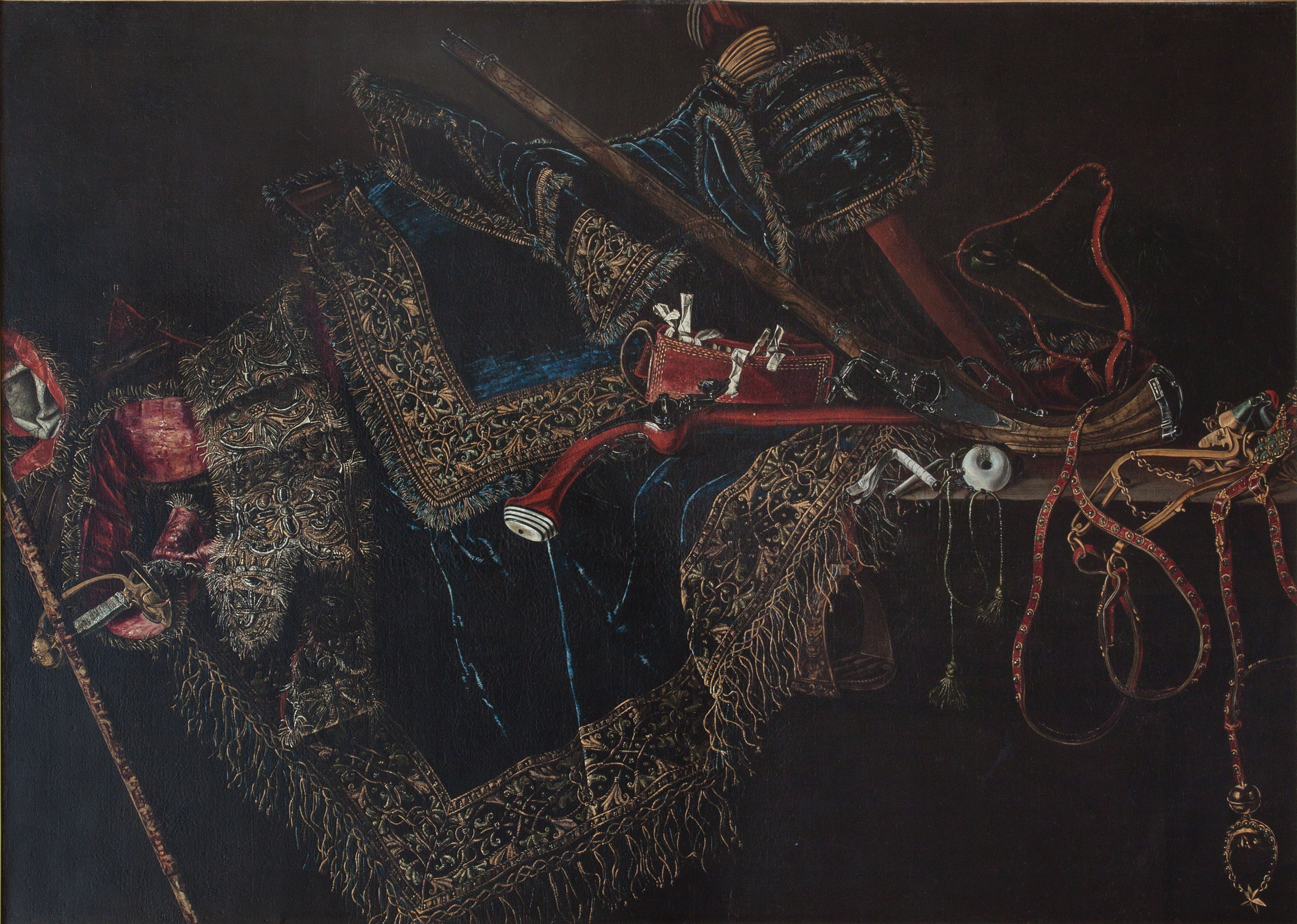
Hunting equipment

In 1658 the artist was likely active in Germany as he should likely be identified with the artist referred to as Peter Kessel who was recorded in Würzburg and Bamberg at that time. He is later recorded in Gdańsk. On his way to work at the court in Copenhagen, he stayed for a while in Lübeck in 1668. Here he worked initially in the workshop of the local painter Burchard Wulff. Later the dean of the local painter's guild Hans Götjens allowed him to work on his own. Götjens also let van Kessel stay in his home. This gave rise to a conflict between dean Gotjens and the local painter's guild which filed a complaint accusing the dean of allowing a foreign master to practise the painter's trade without being properly registered with the local guild. The guild members also felt insulted because Götjens had stated that none of them could paint as well as van Kessel.

From the documents relating to the complaint it appears that van Kessel was at the time just stopping over for about a month in Lübeck while he was on his way to Copenhagen to which he had been allegedly called by the Danish king. Van Kessel was separately also accused of having made derogatory remarks about the members of the Council of Lübeck in retribution of which he was threatened with arrest. A wigmaker paid van Kessels bail for him and in return van Kessel painted some works for the wigmaker.

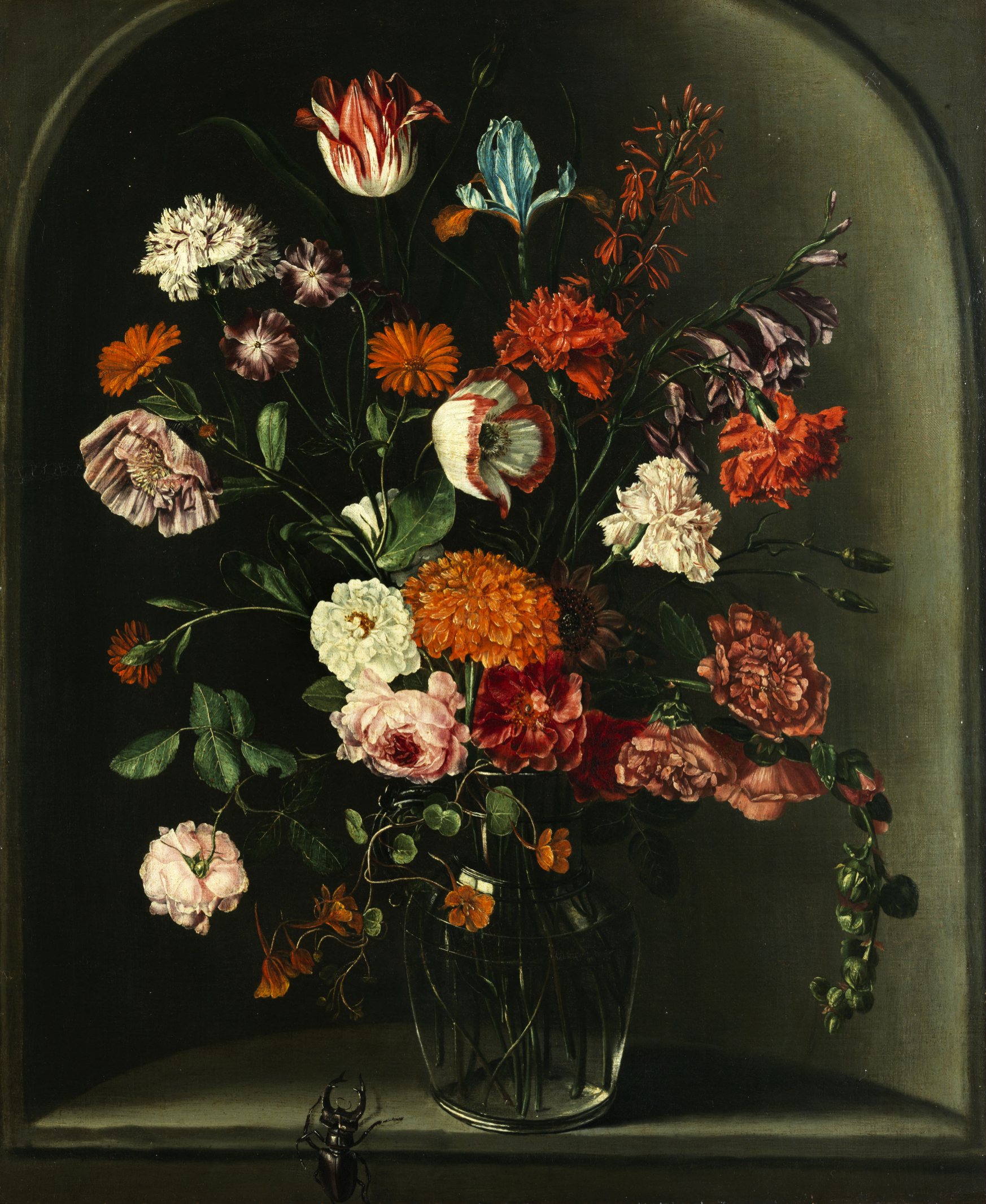
Floral still life in a niche with a stag beetle

Later van Kessel travelled to Copenhagen where he worked at the Danish court. He died in Ratzeburg in early October 1668.

== Work ==
=== General ===
Van Kessel was a specialist still life painter. He practised many of the sub-genres of still life such as flower pieces, fruit still lifes, vanitas still lifes, garland paintings, hunting pieces and game pieces. His earliest dated work dates from 1658.

=== Flower paintings ===
An important portion of van Kessel's output is constituted by floral still lifes. An example is the Floral still life in a niche with a stag beetle (at Hampel Munich sale of 30 March 2017 lot 263<) which shows flowers in a glass vase set in a stone gray niche. The flowers do not reach outside of the niche. The glass vase stands at the very edge of the niche. A stag beetle is about to climb the wall recess and unto to the ledge on which the vase stands. The painter has arranged the flower container in the vase in such a way that all flowers, including roses, tulips, carnations, marigolds and other garden flowers are equally lit up in front of the dark niche wall. Probably as a vanitas reminder (discussed below), the stems or petals of the hollyhock on the right and the nasturtium on the left are shown already drooping slightly. This type of painting is very reminiscent of the still life in a niche paintings of earlier Flemish artists such as Osias Beert.

=== Garland paintings ===
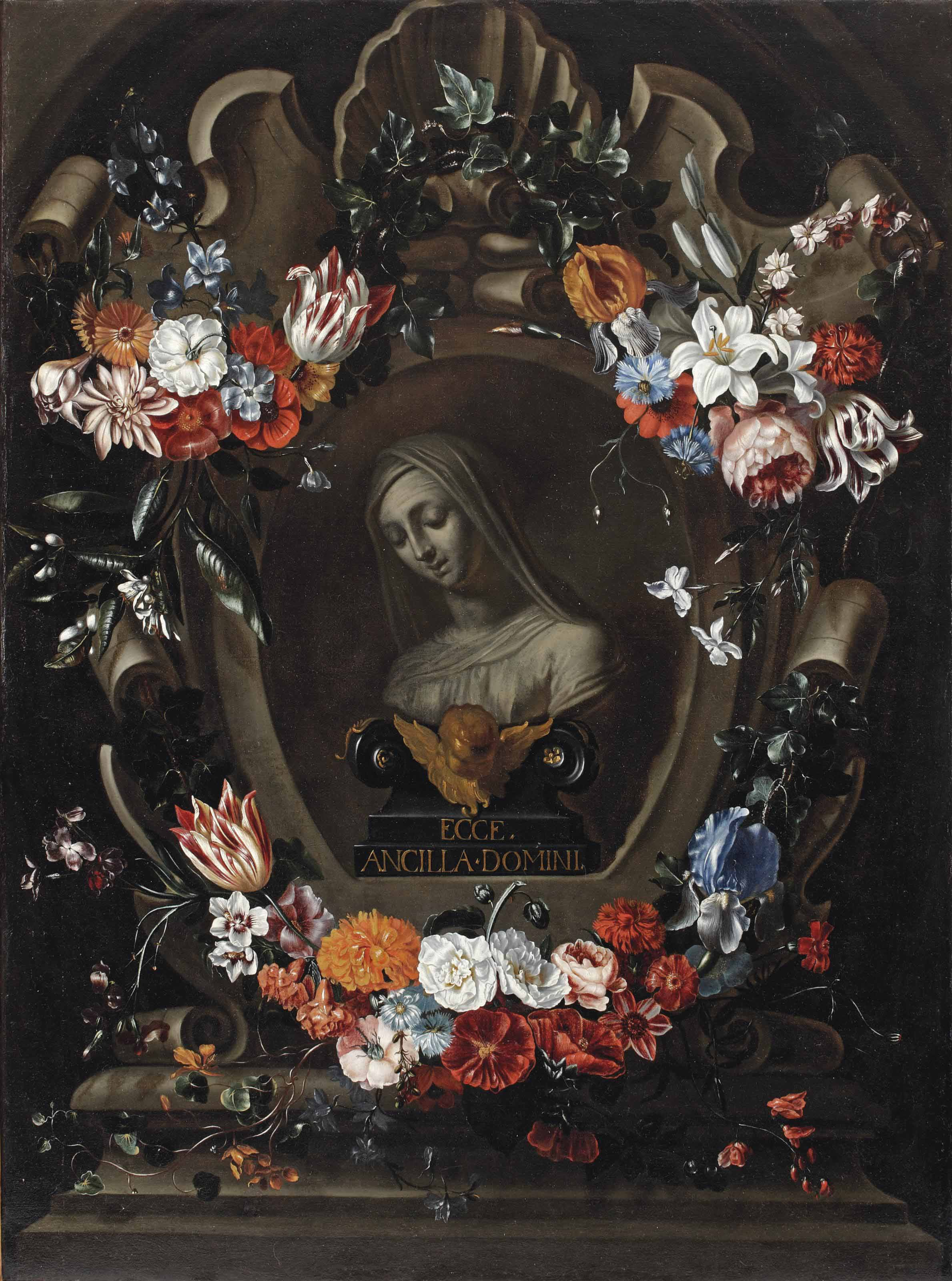
Garland of flowers surrounding a stone cartouche enclosing a bust of the Virgin

A portion of van Kessel's output falls into the category of 'garland paintings'. Garland paintings are a type of still life invented in early 17th century Antwerp by Jan Brueghel the Elder and subsequently practised by leading Flemish still life painters, and in particular Daniel Seghers. Paintings in this genre typically show a flower or, less frequently, fruit garland around a devotional image or portrait. In the later development of the genre, the devotional image is replaced by other subjects such as portraits, mythological subjects and allegorical scenes.

Garland paintings were usually collaborations between a still life and a figure painter. Van Kessel's collaborators on his garland paintings have not been identified. Van Kessel would have painted the fruit and flower garlands while his collaborators would then have painted the figure or figures inside the cartouche. The Garland of flowers surrounding a stone cartouche enclosing a bust of the Virgin is an example of a garland painting attributed to van Kessel. The flowers in the painting resemble those of the Garland surrounding a stone cartouche with a chalice in the Staatsgalerie Bamberg, dated 1658. Stylistically his garland paintings are close to those created by Jan van Kessel the Elder who may have been a family member.

=== Vanitas still lifes ===
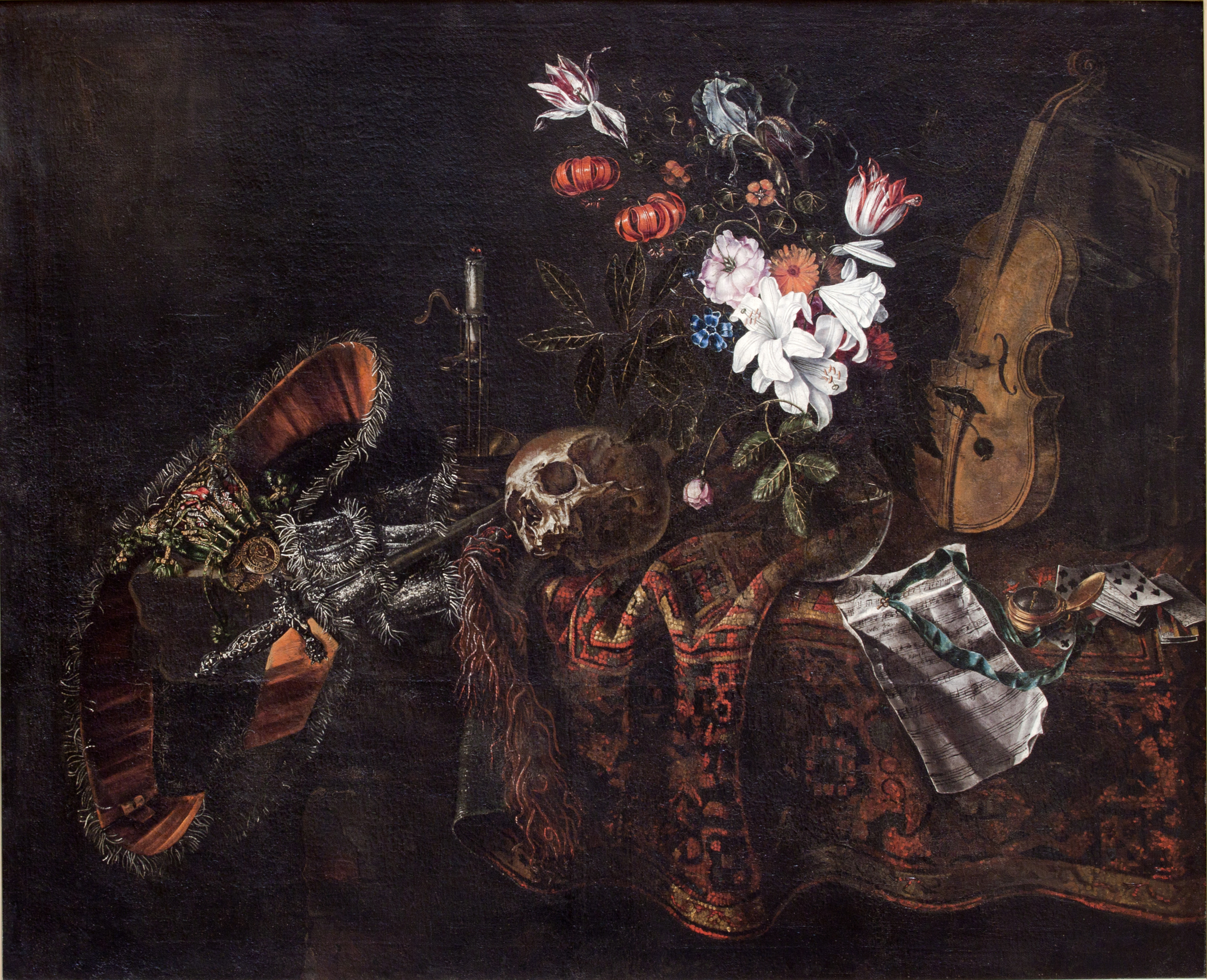
Vanitas still life

Van Kessel is also known for his vanitas still lifes, a genre of still lifes which offers a reflection on the meaninglessness of earthly life and the transient nature of all earthly goods and pursuits. The motif of Vanitas or transience of life is inspired by the Christian belief that the world is solely a temporary place of fleeting pleasures and sorrows from which mankind can only escape through the sacrifice and resurrection of Jesus.

While he painted some pure vanitas paintings, the vanitas theme is also present in his flower paintings. For instance, in the Floral still life in a niche with a stag beetle discussed above the wilting flowers express the vanitas theme of impermanence and death. A pure vanitas painting is his composition Vanitas still life (dated 1668, Museum Catharijneconvent in Utrecht). This composition contains the typical symbols present in vanitas paintings: a skull with a laurel wreath (referencing the passing of glory), dice (referencing the vicissitudes of life), a wine glass, sheet music and a violin (refencing the fleetingness of physical and spiritual pleasures), wilting flowers and an hourglass (refencing decay and the passing of time). The Vanitas still life in the Maribor Regional Museum in Maribor reprises many of the same symbols. In this work, objects that allude to military glory (military distinctions, a sword) are placed on the left while those referencing cultural achievements such as books and music are placed on the right. Physical and spiritual achievements are placed among the symbols of death and decay such as the extinguished candle, the skull and the wilting flowers to convey the idea that all achievements eventually fall into oblivion or extinction.
