= Pseudo-Jan van Kessel the Younger =

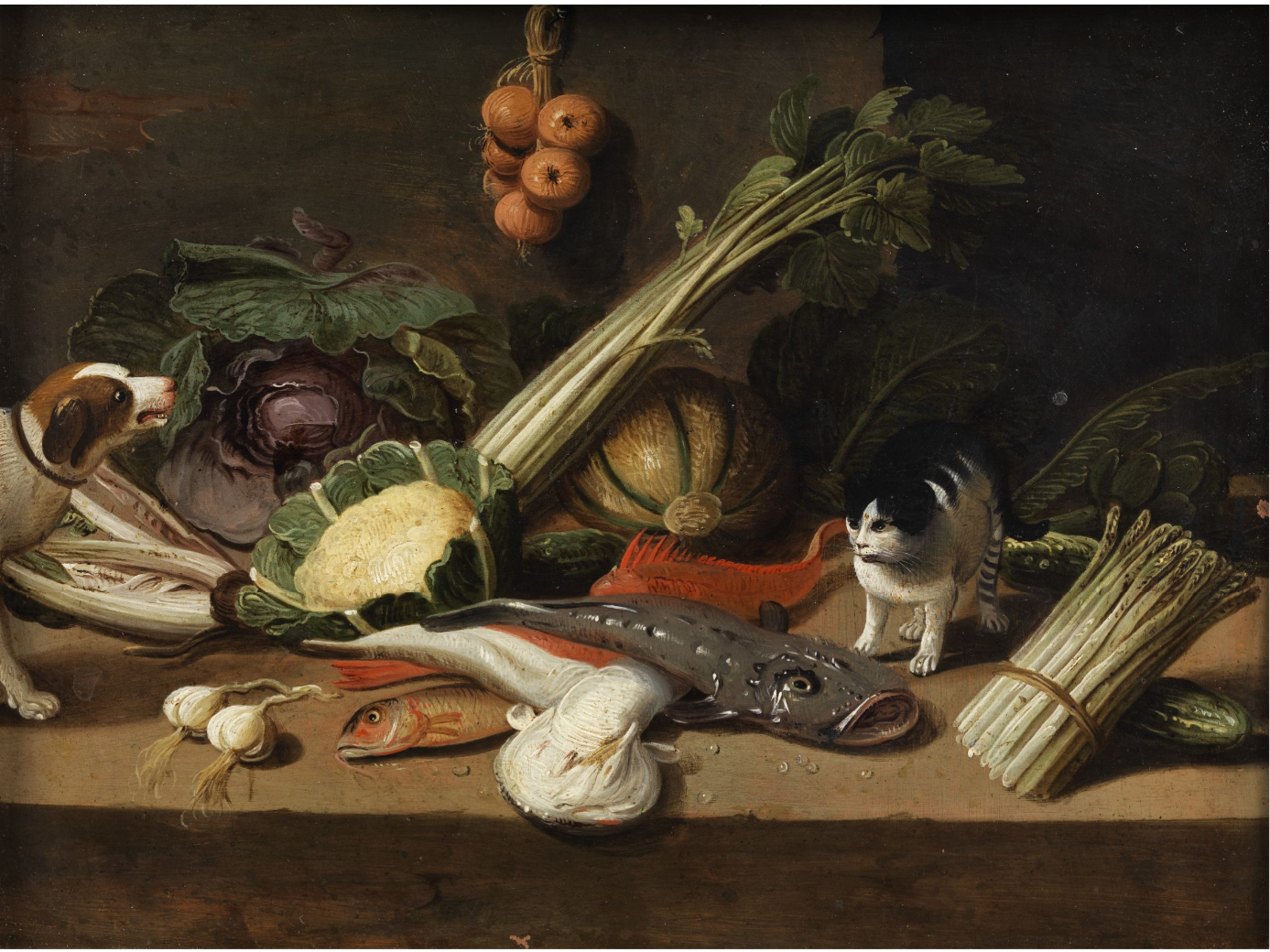
Still life with fish, vegetables, a cat and a dog

Pseudo-Jan van Kessel the Younger or Pseudo-Jan van Kessel the (II) is the notname given to an artist or workshop to whom or which are attributed about 200 small still lifes likely dating to the late 16th and early 17th century. The artist's works rely on combinations of a limited number of motifs in rather simple to quite elaborate compositions. The motifs in the paintings are rendered in a rather naive and decorative manner. While the Flemish influence in the works hints at a Flemish artist or an artist who trained with a Flemish artist, the artist is believed to have been active in southern Europe, probably Italy.

== Identification of the oeuvre ==
None of the works attributed to Pseudo-Jan van Kessel the Younger are signed. Klaus Ertz and Christa Nitze-Ertz catalogued a large part of the oeuvre as the work of Jan van Kessel the Younger in their Die Maler Jan van Kessel : Jan van Kessel der Ältere 1626–1679 : Jan van Kessel der Jüngere 1654–1708 : Jan van Kessel der 'Andere' ca. 1620-ca. 1661: kritische Kataloge der Gemälde, Lingen : De Luca, 2012.

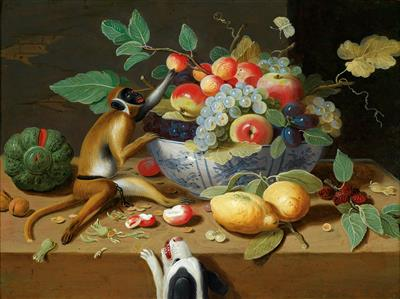
Still life of fruit with a monkey and a dog

As Jan van Kessel the Younger's small known authentic oeuvre is different in style and execution and substantially higher in quality than the works so attributed were re-attributed by the Dutch at historian Fred G. Meijer to an anonymous artist or a workshop identified by the notname Pseudo Jan van Kessel the Younger. For the sake of convenience, the Netherlands Institute for Art History (RKD) catalogued paintings by Pseudo-Jan van Kessel II previously (until 2017) as 'studio of Jan van Kessel the Elder'.

The artist is believed to have been working in southern Europe, likely Italy, during the late 16th and early 17th century. The themes and style of the works suggest that the artist was Flemish or of Flemish descent or was trained in the Flemish style.

The artist should be distinguished from the artist referred to as Pseudo van Kessel, who painted subjects that resemble those of Jan van Kessel the Elder, particularly in the color palette, and in whose work the influence of Osias Beert and Jacob van Es is obvious. This Pseudo van Kessel was possibly a Flemish artist by the name of Raffo Morghen or the German painter Gorthard de Wedig (Cologne 1583–1641).

== Work ==
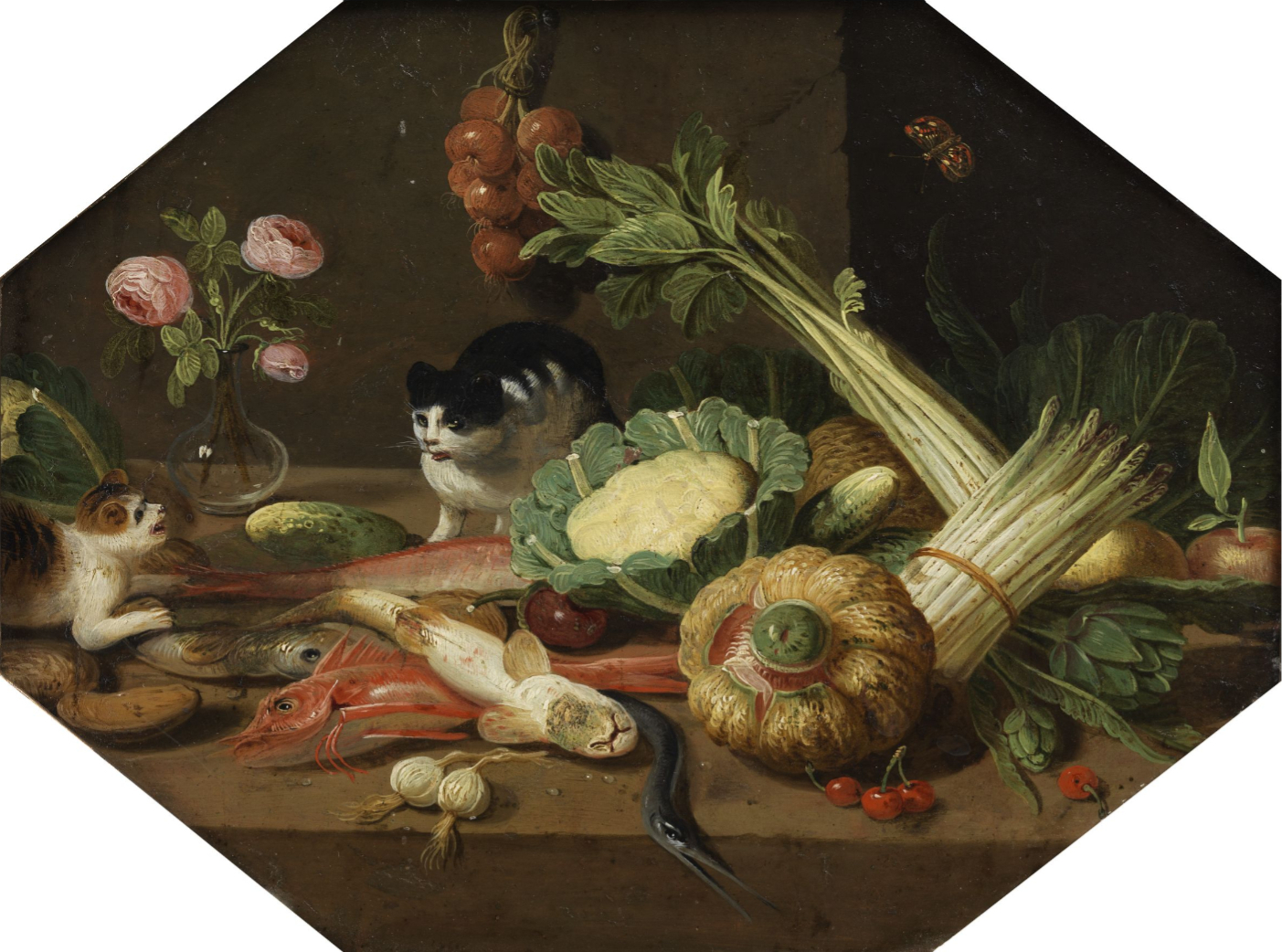
Still life with fish, vegetables, flowers and two cats

The works attributed to Pseudo-Jan van Kessel the Younger often occur in pairs and occasionally in larger sets. They are typically small in size and mostly painted on unmarked copper, occasionally on walnut panels, while one is executed on slate. The copper supports, as well as the fact that several of the works have an Italian provenance, suggest that these works were painted in Southern Europe, probably in Italy.

Pseudo-Jan van Kessel the Younger occasionally borrowed motifs from Flemish examples, but only in one instance (a pair of gurnards) from Jan van Kessel the Elder, with whose oeuvre there is no further direct relationship. The variety in quality of execution and their apparent mass production suggest that these still lifes were the product of a studio, rather than of one individual artist.
