= Kessell =

Kessell is a surname. Notable people with the surname include:

- Mary Kessell (1914–1977), British artist
- Rick Kessell (born 1949), Canadian ice hockey player
- Simone Kessell (born 1975), New Zealand actress

Fictional characters:

- Akar Kessell, character in The Icewind Dale novels by R.A. Salvatore

== See also ==
- Kessel (surname)
