= Jan Thomas van Kessel =

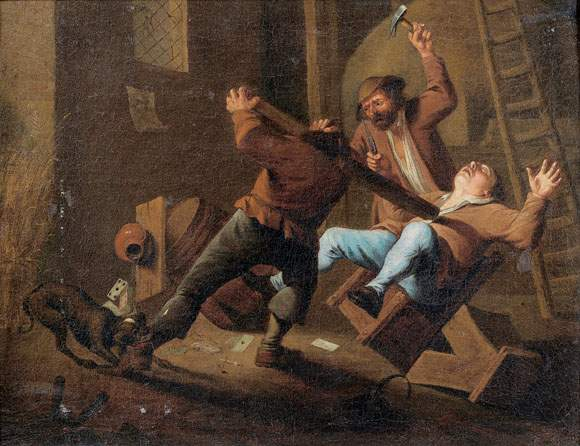
Brawl in an inn after a card game

Jan Thomas van Kessel (Antwerp, 10 September 1677 – Antwerp, 1741) was a Flemish painter and draughtsman. He was principally a genre painter who created scenes of peasants, wedding festivals and interiors of inns. He also painted some portraits and possibly also religious scenes. He was a member of the important van Kessel family of artists, which was related by marriage to the Brueghel family of artists.

== Life ==
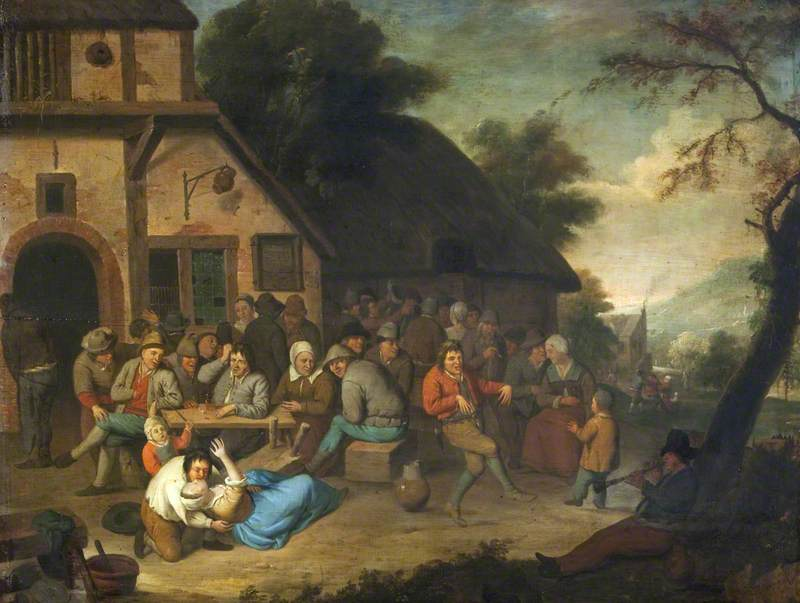
Peasants carousing outside an inn

Jan Thomas van Kessel was born in Antwerp on 10 September 1677 as the son of Thomas van Kessel. His father was the son of the prominent painter Jan van Kessel the Elder and a brother of the painters Jan van Kessel the Younger and Ferdinand van Kessel. Through his grandfather Jan van Kessel the Elder he was related to the Brueghel family of artists as his great-grandfather Hieronymus van Kessel the Younger was married to Paschasia Brueghel who was the daughter of Jan Brueghel the Elder).

Father Thomas van Kessel had not chosen an artistic career like his own father and brothers but had become a notary in Antwerp. Jan Thomas, on the other hand, chose to follow in the footsteps of many members of his family who had become artists. In the guild year running from 18 September 1691 to 18 September 1692 he was registered as a pupil of Peter Ykens in the registers of the Antwerp Guild of St. Luke.

It is believed that after the death of his master Peter Ykens in 1695 he continued his studies in Breda with his uncle Ferdinand van Kessel who was working there on a commission for the palace of William III of Orange. He stayed in Breda during the years 1696 and 1697. He then spent some time in Paris around the period 1702–03.

He returned to Antwerp where he registered as a master in the Antwerp Guild in the guild year 1703–1704. He married Isabella Bruynel.

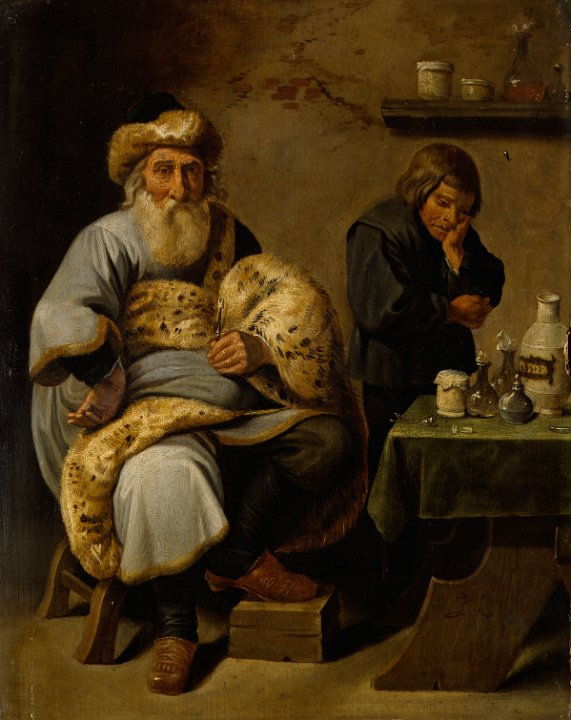
The dentist

He remained in Antwerp until his death in 1741.

== Work ==
Van Kessel was principally a genre painter who created scenes of peasants, wedding festivals and interiors of inns. He also painted some portraits and may also have made some religious compositions.

His work shows the strong influence of David Teniers the Younger, the leading Flemish genre painter in the second half of the 17th century. Teniers had been an important innovator of genre painting through his vivid depictions of peasants, soldiers and other 'lower class' individuals, whom he showed engaged in drinking, smoking, card or dice playing, fighting, music making etc. usually in taverns or rustic settings. He also painted scenes with alchemists and medical professionals. Van Kessel often depicted similar subject matter as Teniers such as in the Brawl in an inn after a card game (1701, Piasa (Paris) auction of 22 July 2007, lot 57) and the Peasants carousing outside an inn (Packwood House, Warwickshire).

A Flagellation of Christ (possibly 1709, Museum Catharijneconvent) has also been attributed to him.
