= Jan van Kessel the Younger =

Flemish painter

Jan van Kessel II
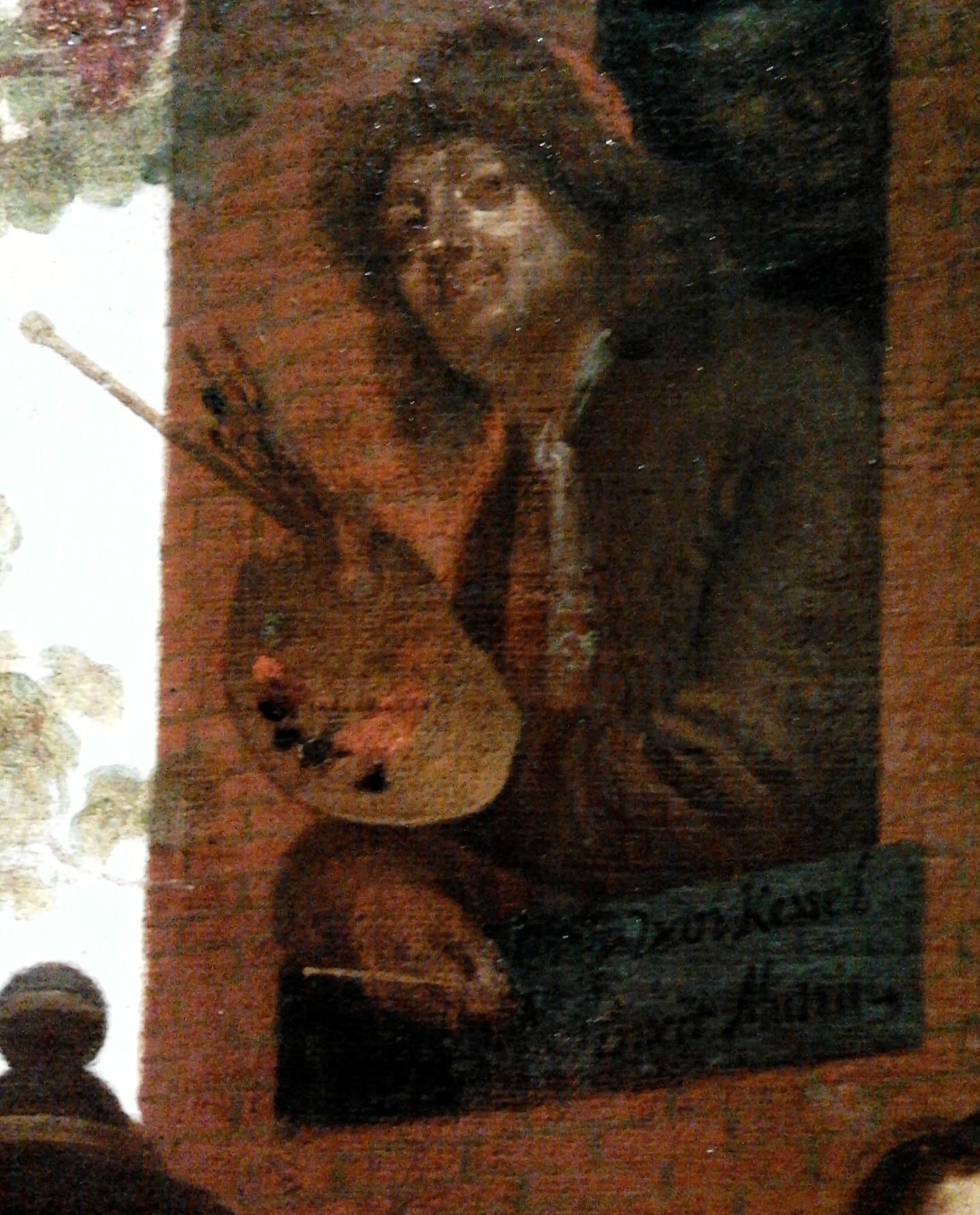
- Self-portrait, detail of his Portrait of a family in a garden, 1679
- Born: 23 November 1654; Antwerp
- Died: 1708 (aged 53–54); Madrid
- Father: Jan van Kessel the Elder

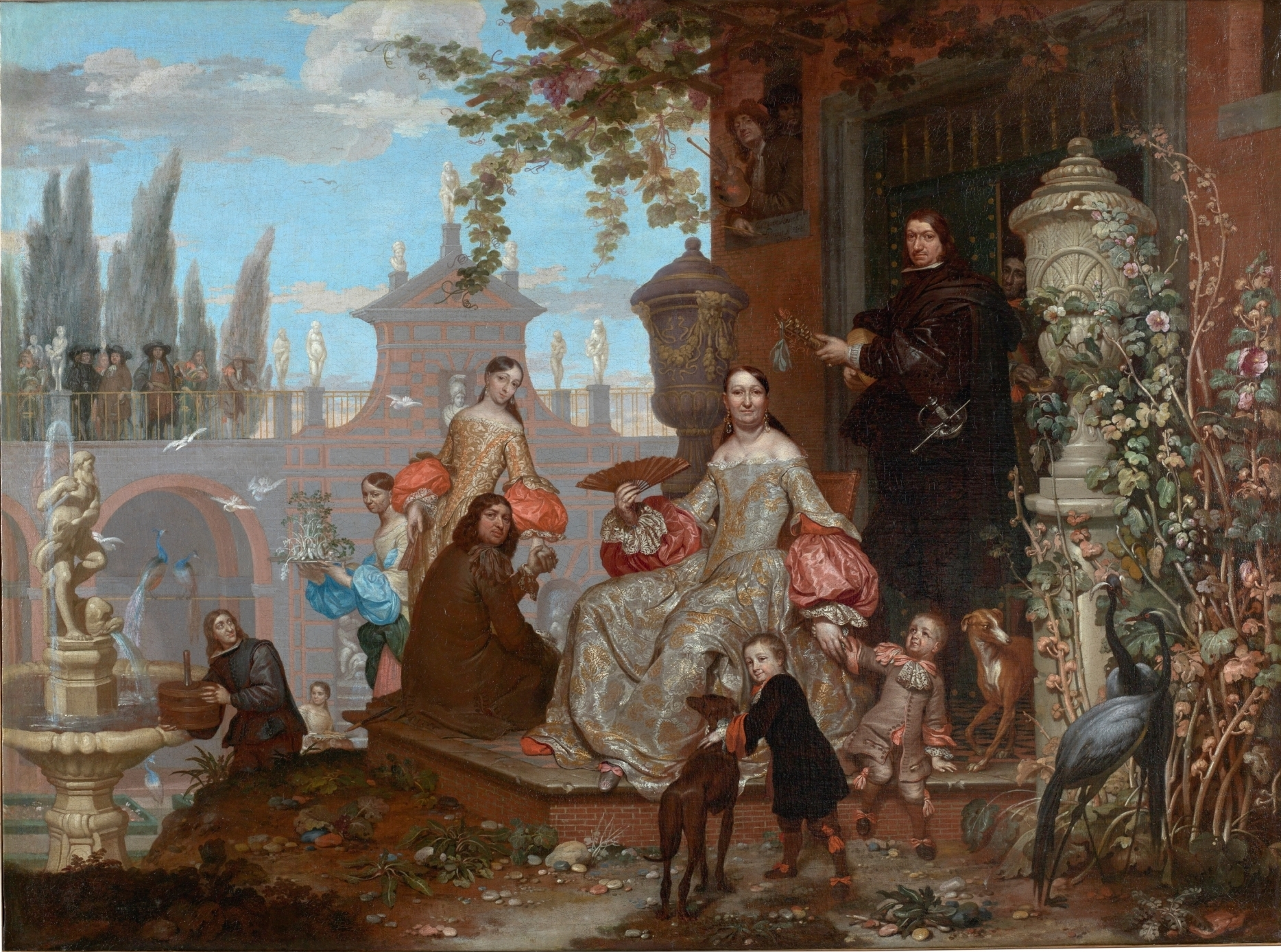
Portrait of a family in a garden, 1679, Prado Museum

Jan van Kessel the Younger or Jan van Kessel II (Antwerp, 23 November 1654 – Madrid, 1708), known in Spain as Juan Vanchesel el Mozo or el Joven, was a Flemish painter who after training in Antwerp worked in Spain. Known mainly for his portraits he became a court painter to the King and Queen of Spain. A few landscapes and mythological and allegorical scenes have also been attributed to him. He was formerly believed to have been active as a landscape painter, but this is now no longer generally accepted.

== Life ==
Jan van Kessel the Younger was born in Antwerp as the son of Jan van Kessel the Elder (1626–1679) and Maria van Apshoven. He was a scion of the famous Flemish dynasty of painters of the Brueghel family. His father was the son of Hieronymus van Kessel the Younger and Paschasia Brueghel (the daughter of Jan Brueghel the Elder). Jan van Kessel the Younger was thus, through his paternal grandmother, the great-grandson of Jan Brueghel the Elder and great-great-grandson to Pieter Brueghel the Elder. As his mother was the daughter of the painter Ferdinand van Apshoven the Elder, he was also related to the van Apshoven family of artists. His brother Ferdinand was also a painter.

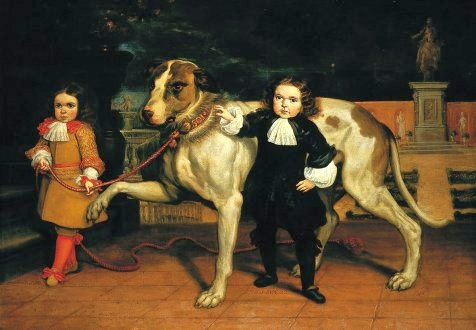
Dwarfs with a dog

He likely trained under his father Jan van Kessel the Elder. Rather than becoming a master in the Antwerp Guild of Saint Luke, he moved to Madrid in or before 1679. In Madrid he became a painter to the court and gained a reputation mainly through his portraits.

The artists gained recognition at court under the reign of Charles II of Spain for the portraits he made of Queen Marie Louise d'Orléans, first wife of Charles II. In 1686 he became officially the painter of the Queen. He is said to have received a commission from the Queen to paint scenes on the ceiling of her chambers in the Royal Alcazar of Madrid. Upon the death of the first wife of Charles II, van Kessel continued to serve as a portrait painter at the court and gained the favour of the king's new wife, Maria Anna of Neuburg.

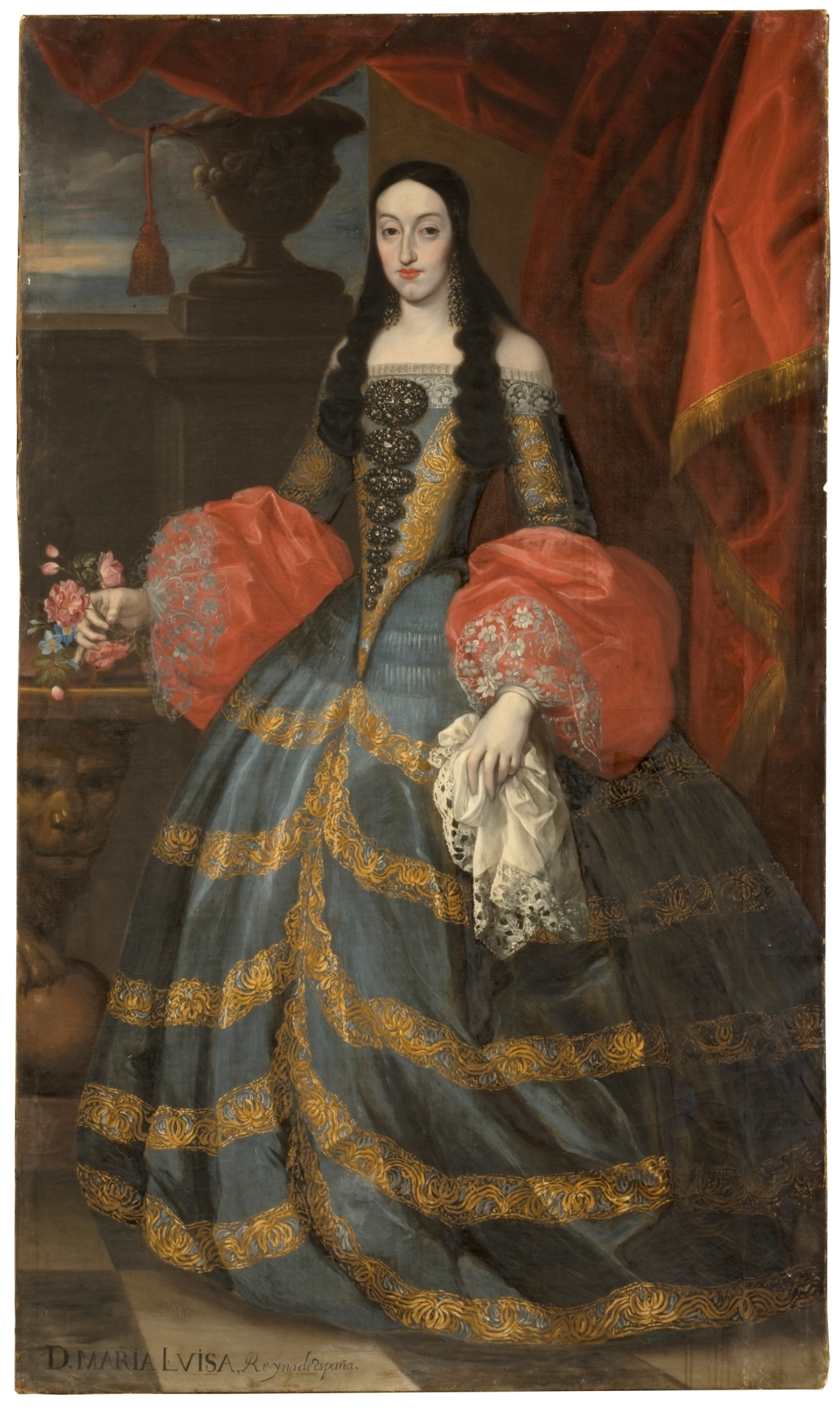
Portrait of Marie Louise d’Orléans (attributed)

With the change of ruling dynasty from the Habsburgs to the Bourbons following the accession to the throne of Philip V of Spain in 1700, the artist's popularity at court went into decline. This was likely due to his continued close relationship with the widowed former Queen, whom he accompanied in her exile in Toledo with the title of furrier's aid. He did not join her in her exile to Bayonne in 1706 due to his precarious health. Instead, van Kessel returned to Madrid. The new king was not happy with his work possibly due to the ascendancy of French tastes at the Bourbon court. The artist had become well-off by that time.

He is believed to have died in Madrid in 1708.

== Work ==
=== General ===
He is said to have painted portraits, flower pieces, still lifes, game pieces, art galleries and landscapes. Some art historians have questioned whether the attribution to Jan van Kessel the Younger of still lifes. Such attribution may have been caused in certain instances by confusion with other artists with a similar name all active in the 17th century. In addition to his father, there was another Antwerp painter with the name Jan van Kessel (referred to as 'the other' Jan van Kessel) who painted still lifes, while in Amsterdam there was a Jan van Kessel known as a landscape painter. To complicate things further, because his father had an uncle also called Jan van Kessel, his father is sometimes referred to as Jan van Kessel II and Jan van Kessel the Younger as Jan van Kessel III. Finally there was another member of the van Kessel family who was called Jan Thomas van Kessel who worked principally as a genre painter.

As van Kessel rarely signed his paintings, his oeuvre has been reconstructed based on stylistic grounds.

=== Portraits ===
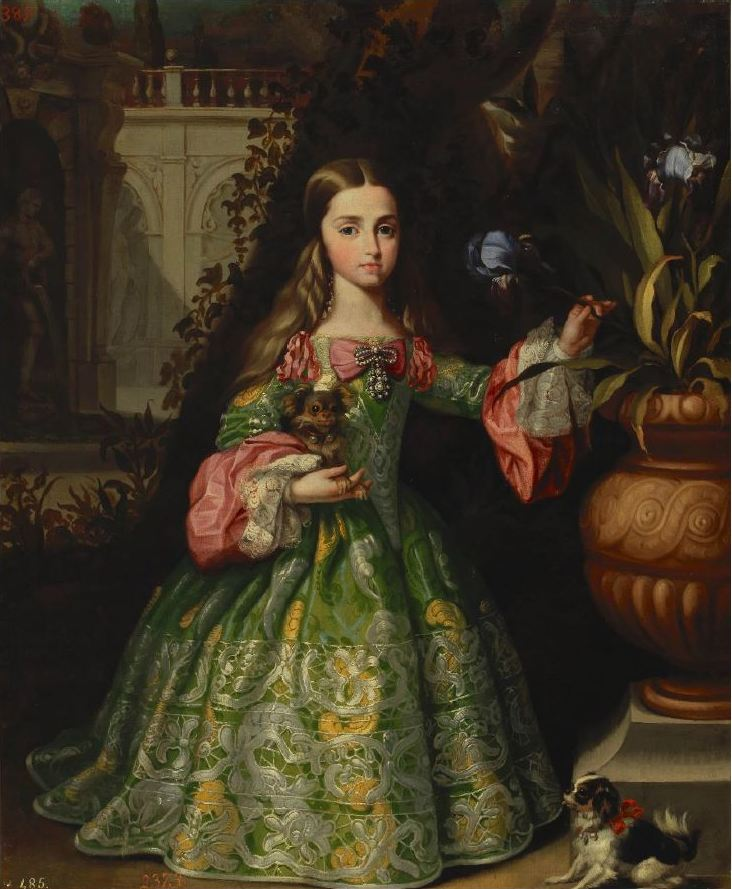
Portrait of Maria Nicolasa de la Cerda

Van Kessel's main duty as a court painter was to paint portraits of the royal family and in particular the queen. His portrait style was described by his contemporary Antonio Palomino as very close to that of his fellow Flemish painter Anthony van Dyck. Upon his arrival in Spain he seems to have followed the style of royal portraiture introduced by Diego Velázquez and continued by Claudio Coello. These portraits were characterized by their simplicity of shapes and color which included hardly any props or symbols and set off the sitter against a neutral background. This influence of the local Spanish portrait tradition is visible in the Portrait of Maria Anna of Neuburg (1690, private collection in Madrid). He abandoned this style in the Portrait of Maria Anna of Neuburg by adding more color and a view into a landscape in the background. This work forms a pair with the Portrait of Charles II of Spain. The two oval works had originally been part of a larger square painting representing flower garlands which would have encircled the oval portrait. He had already commenced his innovation of Spanish court portraiture in the Portrait of Maria Nicolasa de la Cerda (c. 1685, Ministry of Public Administration, Madrid) in which he used vivid color and played with the contrast between a clear light and carefully placed shadows. Some portrait paintings have been attributed to him on stylistic grounds by comparing it to his signed paintings. This is the case of the Portrait of Marie Louise d’Orléans, which is still listed as by an unknown painter on the Prado Museum website.

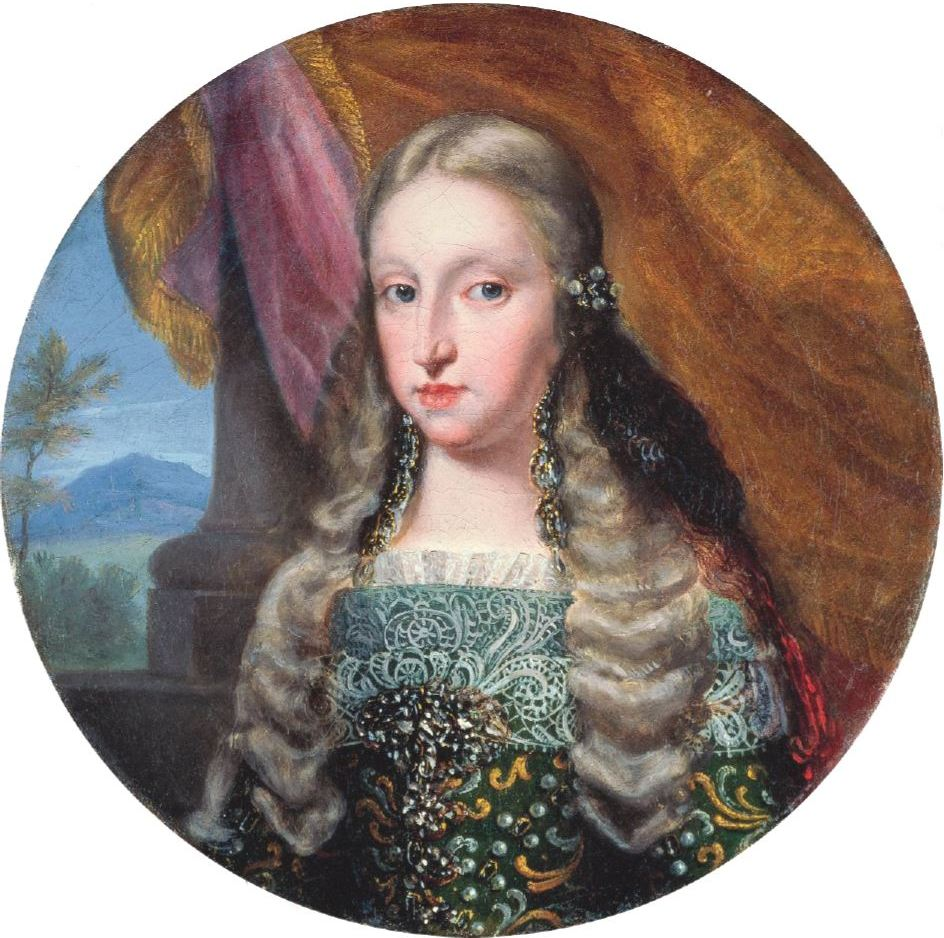
Portrait of Maria Anna of Neuburg

Van Kessel was a specialist of the genre of group portraits. An example is the Portrait of a family in a garden in the Prado Museum, which depicts a Flemish gentleman (believed to be a protector or patron of van Kessel) with his family. The symbolic intent of the work is to praise family life and family virtues such as fidelity. The guitar playing man symbolises family harmony and the dog the virtue of fidelity. The mature woman surrounded by the small children symbolizes the virtue of charity while the young couple holding hands represent conjugal love. The painting includes a self-portrait of the artist who is leaning out of a window in the background to the right. A slightly different version of the work, painted in the same year as the Prado version, is in the National Museum in Warsaw.

He was also known as a painter of small portraits. Such works were very much in vogue among the higher nobility of that period. They were treated as intimate objects that were regaled between family members as well as friends and were therefore in a less formal style than the official portraits. They had the advantage that they could be carried easily by their owners as an object to remember their loved ones by. The first known small portrait he made was the effigy of Charles II (now lost) which was placed in the "big jewel" that the king gave to his spouse Maria Anna of Neuburg as a matrimonial present upon his arrival in Spain in 1690. Another example are the pair of small portraits of Charles II of Spain and Maria Anna of Neuburg (Colección Abelló, Madrid), which are less formal than traditional official portraits. A pair of small portraits of the royal couple are also attributed to him in the Lázaro Galdiano Museum and were likely created to be sent to the Russian court as a diplomatic gift as it shows the king in armor. In another pair of small portraits in a private collection, dated between 1696 and 1700, Charles II of Spain is represented as Saint Ferdinand and Maria Anna of Neuburg as Saint Helena. A further pair of small portraits of the royal couple are in the Museo Nacional de Artes Decorativas in Madrid. Two small effigies of Philip V of Spain and his spouse Maria Luisa of Savoy, dated around 1701, are in the collection of the Real Academia de la Historia in Madrid.

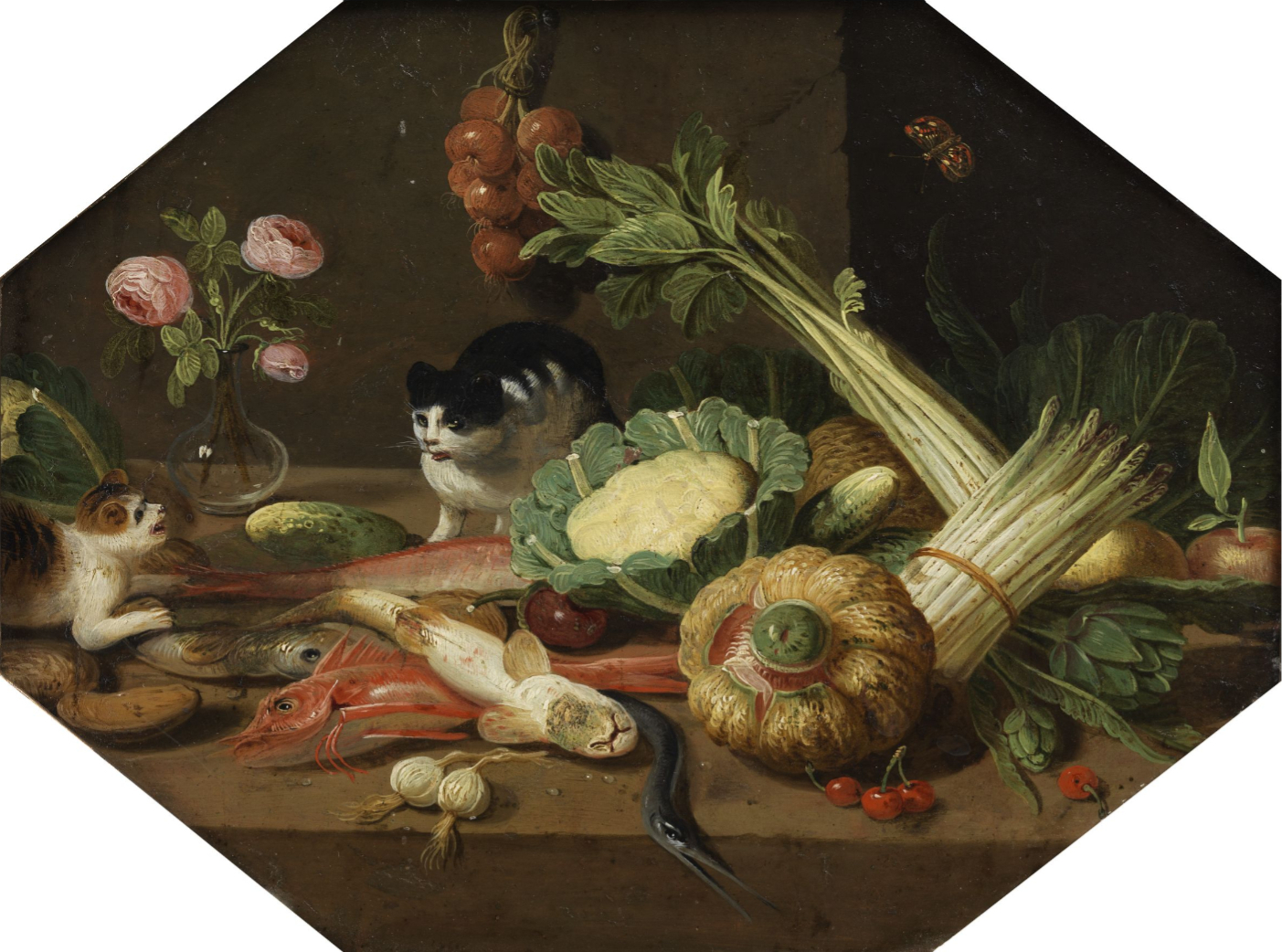
Still life with fish, vegetables, flowers and two cats, formerly attributed to Jan van Kessel the Younger and now to Pseudo-Jan van Kessel the Younger

=== Still lifes ===
While some art historians have questioned whether Jan van Kessel the Younger was a still life painter, various still lifes have been attributed to him. Similar in style to those of his father, these still lifes are perfectly balanced compositions, which are characterized by an attention for detail and the use of delicate colours. It has been speculated that the Flemish style of these still lifes gradually took on some of the features of the style of still life painting of his adoptive country Spain.

A number of still life works previously given to Jan van Kessel the Younger by scholars Klaus Ertz and Christa Nitze-Ertz in their 2012 publication on the painters called Jan van Kessel, has since 2017 been reattributed by the Netherlands Institute for Art History (RKD) to Pseudo-Jan van Kessel the Younger. Pseudo-Jan van Kessel the Younger is the notname given to an artist or workshop to whom or which are attributed about 200 small still lifes produced in Southern Europe in the late 16th and early 17th century. Jan van Kessel the Younger's small known authentic oeuvre is different in style and execution and substantially higher in quality than the works, which have now been attributed to Pseudo Jan van Kessel the Younger.

=== Landscapes ===
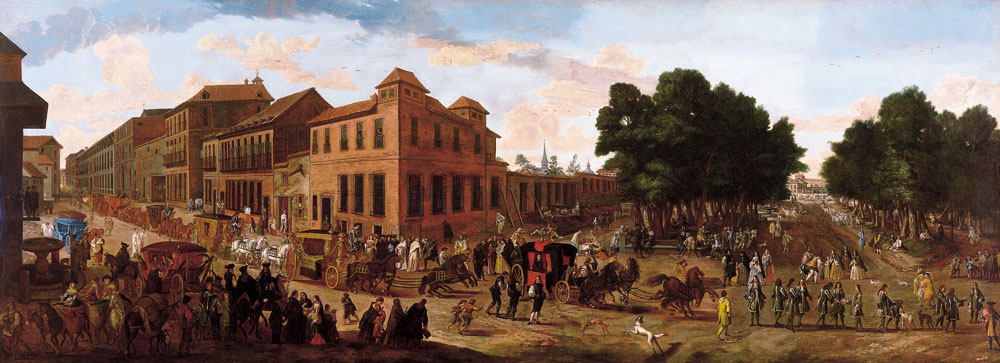
View of the Carrera de San Jerónimo and the Paseo del Prado with a Procession of Carriages

Antonio Palomino also mentioned that van Kessel was a skilled landscape artist. No work in this genre has been securely attributed to van Kessel. A topographical view of a street in Madrid representing a View of the Carrera de San Jerónimo and the Paseo del Prado with a Procession of Carriages (Thyssen-Bornemisza Museum, Madrid) has tentatively been attributed to him.

=== Other subjects ===
Van Kessel's father Jan the Elder, his great-grandfather Jan Brueghel the Elder and great-uncle Jan Brueghel the Younger all painted a wide range of subjects including mythological and allegorical paintings in a similar tradition. Regularly works on such subjects have been attributed to Jan van Kessel the Younger. This includes the Venus in the forge of Vulcan (Hampel Munich auction of 12 December 2013 lot 564, figures by another artist) and the Allegory of Earth (Artcurial auction of 13 November 2018 lot 40, a collaboration with Abraham Willemsens). Both works show how Jan van Kessel the Younger continued the traditions of his family as well as the work practice of Antwerp's workshops in which compositions were often created in collaboration between specialist artists. In each work the figures were not painted by van Kessel himself but by specialist figure painters.

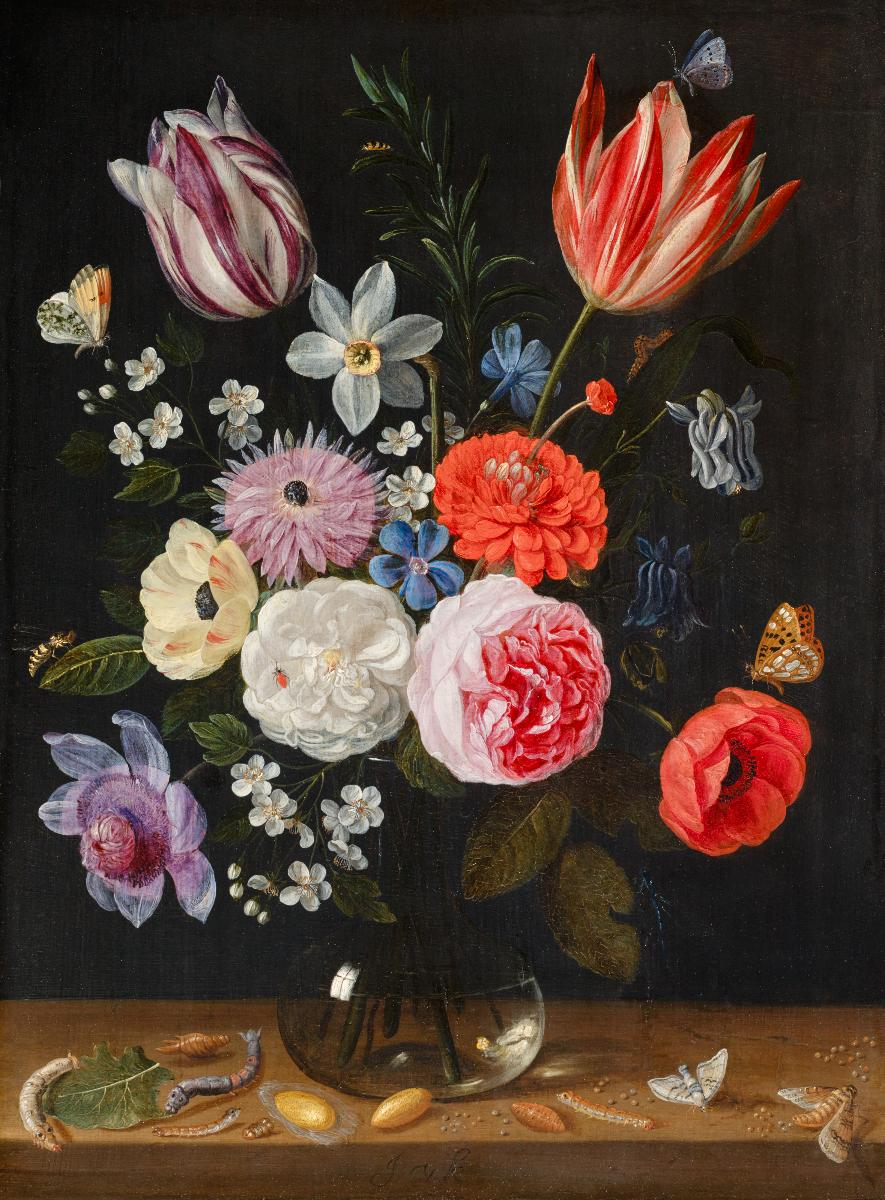
Blumen in Glasvase mit Entwicklung der Seidenraupe
