= Kessel (surname) =

Kessel (German, from Middle High German Keʒʒel "kettle, cauldron") is a metonymic occupational name for a maker of copper cooking vessels. Notable people with the surname include:

- Al Kessel (c. 1938–2012), founder of Kessel Food Markets
- Amanda Kessel (born 1991), American ice hockey player
- Barney Kessel (1923–2004), American jazz guitarist
- Benjamin Kessel (born 1987), German footballer
- Edward L. Kessel (1904–1997), American biologist
- Franziska Kessel (1906–1934), German politician
- Georgina Kessel, Mexican economist
- Gustav von Kessel (1846–1918), German general
- Jerrold Kessel (1944–2011), South African-born Israeli journalist
- John Kessel (born 1950), American author
- John Van Kessel (born 1969), Canadian ice hockey player
- Joseph Kessel (1898–1979), French writer
- Lipmann Kessel (1914–1986), South African surgeon
- Loris Kessel (1950–2010), Swiss racing driver
- Matthew Kessel (born 2000), American ice hockey player
- Mortimer von Kessel (1893–1981), German general
- Oliver D. Kessel (1901–1992), justice of the Supreme Court of Appeals of West Virginia
- Phil Kessel (born 1987), American ice hockey player
- Richard Kessel (born c. 1950), American businessman

== See also ==
- Van Kessel
- Kessell
- Kessler (name)
