= 'the other' Jan van Kessel =

Flemish painter

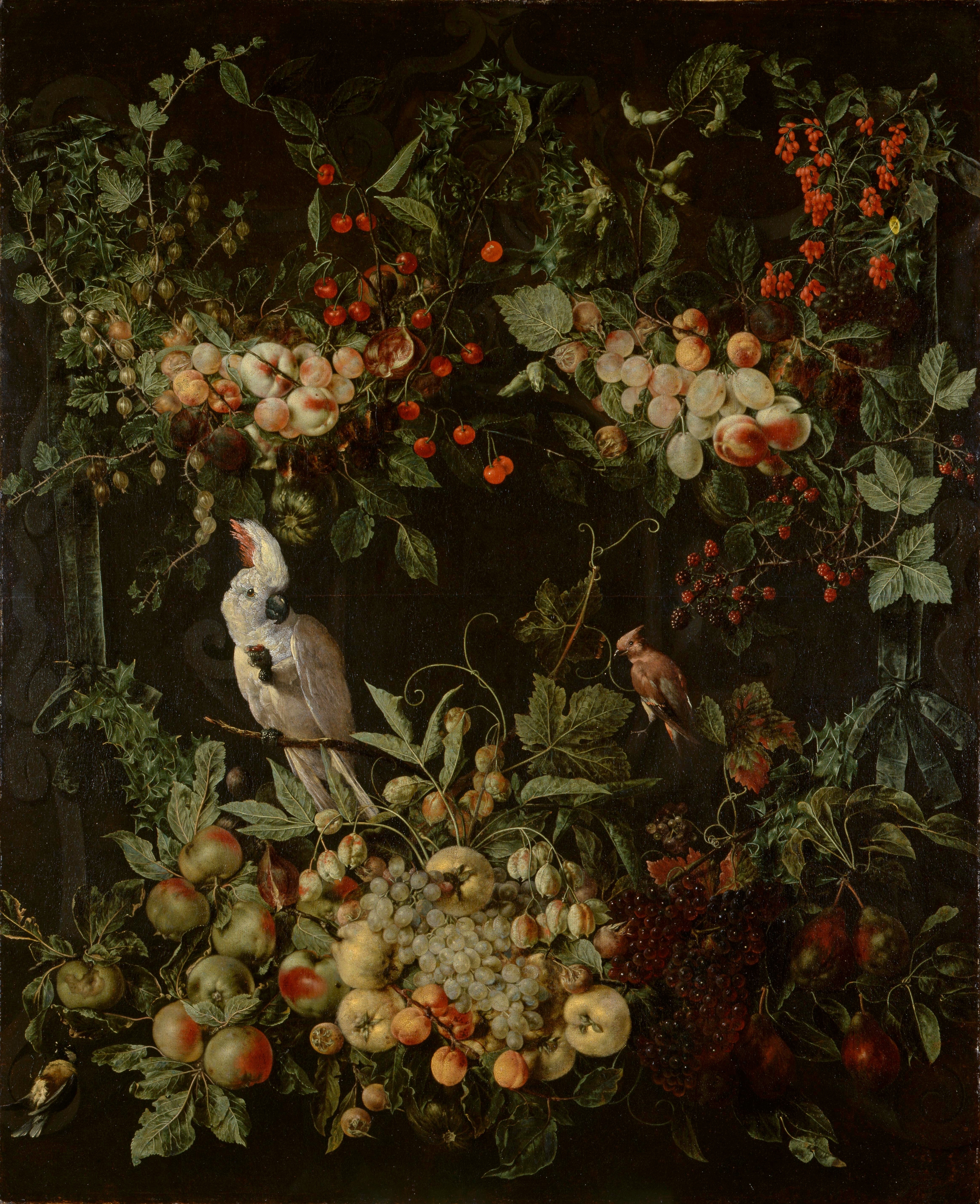
Swags of fruit and flowers surrounding a cartouche with a sulphur-crested cockatoo (c. 1650–1660)

Jan van Kessel (c. 1620 – in or after 1661) sometimes known as the other Jan van Kessel to distinguish him from contemporary artists of the same name, was a Flemish painter of still lifes of fruits, hunting pieces and flowers. After training in Antwerp he moved to the Dutch Republic where he is recorded as operating a studio in Amsterdam.

== Biography ==
Very little information is available about the life of Jan van Kessel. He was born in Antwerp some time between 1615 and 1625. He trained with the history painter Simon de Vos. He was admitted as a master in the Antwerp Guild of St Luke in the Guild year 1644–1645, the same year as Jan van Kessel the Elder with whom he is often confused.

He is recorded in 1649 in Amsterdam, where he received in September 1649 two assistants: Jan Baptist Walvis and Gerrit Cornelisz.

His last recorded work dates from 1661 and he is believed to have died in or after 1661, possibly in Amsterdam.

== Work ==
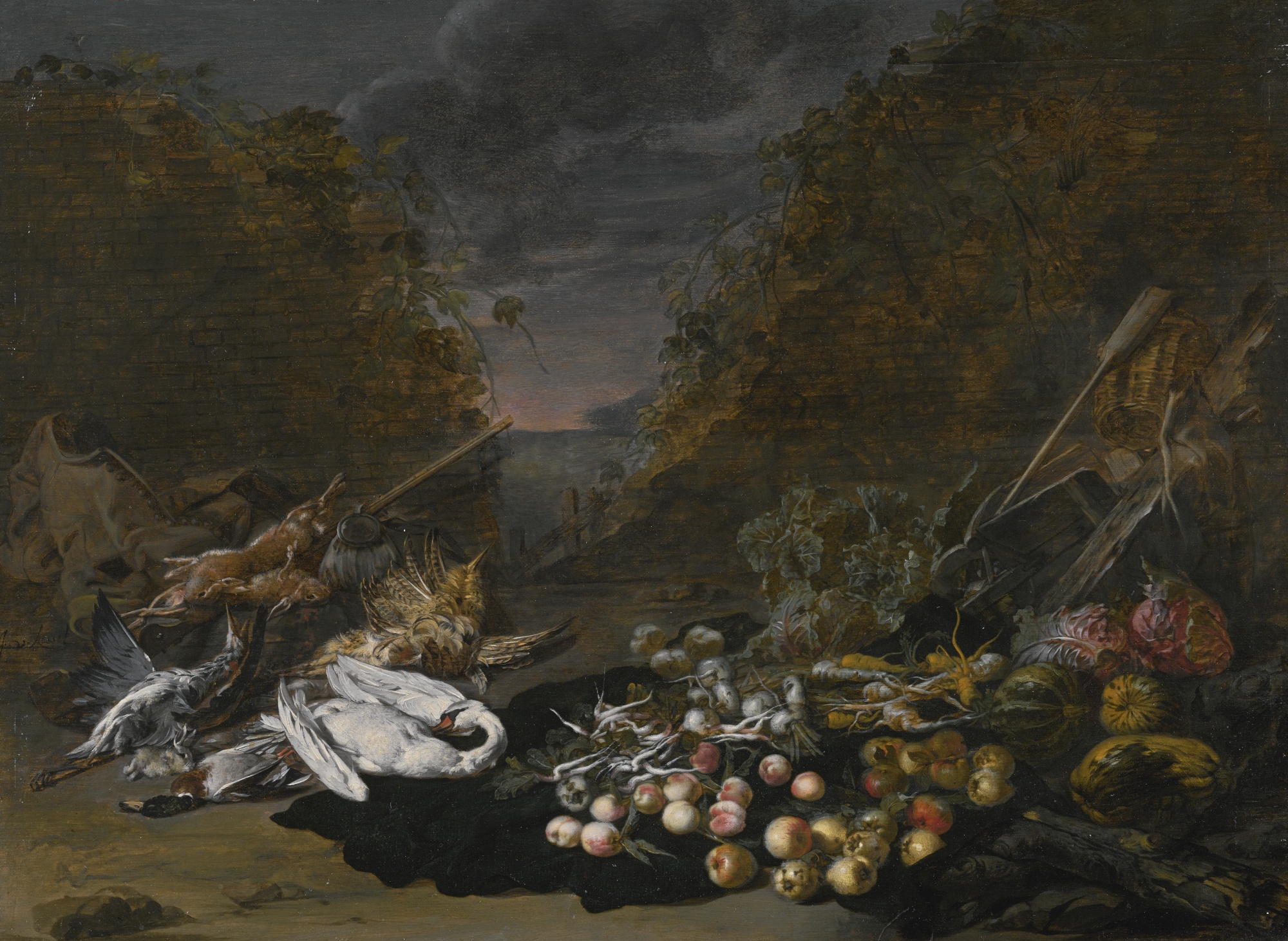
Still life of a swan, other birds, rabbits, fruit and vegetables and a landscape beyond (c. 1634–1661)

'The other' Jan van Kessel was a still life specialist who painted still lifes of fruits, hunting pieces and flowers. About 30 works have been attributed to Jan van Kessel. Attribution of work to 'the other' Jan van Kessel has been difficult due to confusion with other artists with a similar name all active around the same time. In addition to the still life painter Jan van Kessel the Elder, there was another Antwerp painter referred to as Jan van Kessel the Younger (the son of Jan van Kessel the Elder) who is believed to have painted still lifes, while in Amsterdam there was a Jan van Kessel known as a landscape painter.

'The other' Jan van Kessel's work has often been confused with that of his better known namesake and contemporary, Jan van Kessel the Elder as well as that of Jan van Kessel the Younger. 'The other' Jan van Kessel and Jan van Kessel the Elder have a distinctive manner of signing.

There are clear stylistic differences between the work of 'the other' Jan van Kessel and Jan van Kessel the Elder. Art historian K. Ertz considers 'the other' Jan van Kessel as not inferior to Jan van Kessel the Elder, and has asserted he eclipsed his more famous namesake in his masterpiece Swags of fruit and flowers surrounding a cartouche with a sulphur-crested cockatoo. This work is in the collection of the Fitzwilliam Museum where it is still attributed to Jan van Kessel the Elder.
