= Van Dessel =

Van Dessel may refer to:

== Surname ==
- Kevin Van Dessel (born 1979), Belgian footballer
- Romeo Van Dessel (born 1989), Belgian footballer
- Wout Van Dessel (born 1974), Belgian DJ, member of Sylver

== Businesses ==
- Van Dessel Sports, a bicycle brand based in Mendham, New Jersey

== See also ==
- Van Kessel, a surname
