= Jan van Kessel (Amsterdam) =

Dutch Golden Age draftsman and painter

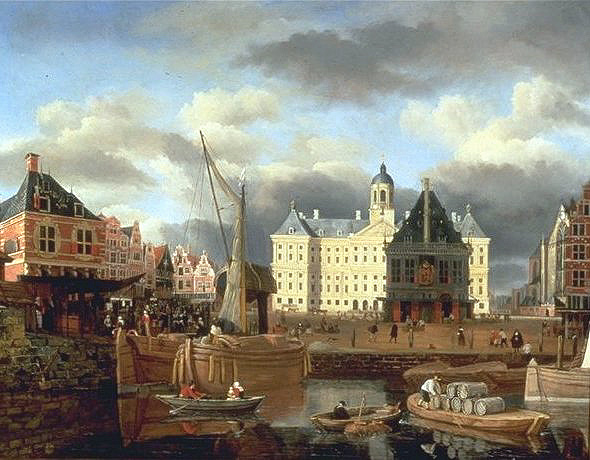
The Amsterdam City Hall with the old Weigh House on the Dam (the weigh house was dismantled during the French occupation).

Jan van Kessel (1641 or 1648 – 1680) was a Dutch Golden Age draftsman and landscape painter who made many cityscapes of Amsterdam. His work is often confused with the works of contemporary painters with the same name.

== Biography ==
According to Houbraken he was born in Amsterdam in 1648 and made clever farm scenes that he first drew from life before making his oil paintings. Houbraken went on to mention that he was best known for his winter scenes and died in 1698. Houbraken couldn't discover whether he was related to the Jan van Kessel of Antwerp, who was mentioned in Cornelis de Bie's book Het Gulden Cabinet.

According to the RKD he was the son of the framemaker Thomas Jacobsz van Kessel, and the pupil of the landscape painter Jacob van Ruisdael in Amsterdam. He is known for cityscapes, beach scenes, winter landscapes and architectural works. Many of his works are similar to those of van Ruisdael and have been taken as his, sometimes after faked signatures were added.
