= Kessels =

Kessels is a Dutch toponymic surname indicating an origin in one of a variety of places named Kessel in the Low Countries. Notable people with the surname include:

- Erik Kessels (born 1966), Dutch artist, designer and curator, co-founder of KesselsKramer advertising agency
- Hendrik Johan Kessels (1781–1849), Dutch clockmaker active in Denmark
- Hubert Kessels (fl. 1959–62), economist and a governor of the Bank of Ghana
- Koen Kessels (born 1960/61), Belgian conductor and music director
- Marie Kessels (born 1954), Dutch poet and prose writer
- Mathieu Kessels (1784–1836), Dutch neoclassical sculptor
- Paulus Kessels (1901–1987), Dutch sports shooter

== See also ==
- J. Kessels, a Dutch drama film
- Kessel (disambiguation)
