= Maren =

Maren may refer to:

- Maren (name)
- Maren, Netherlands
- Maren (energy management system)
- The Groovy Girls doll line, by Manhattan Toy, features a doll named Maren
