= Het Wild =

- Hamlet
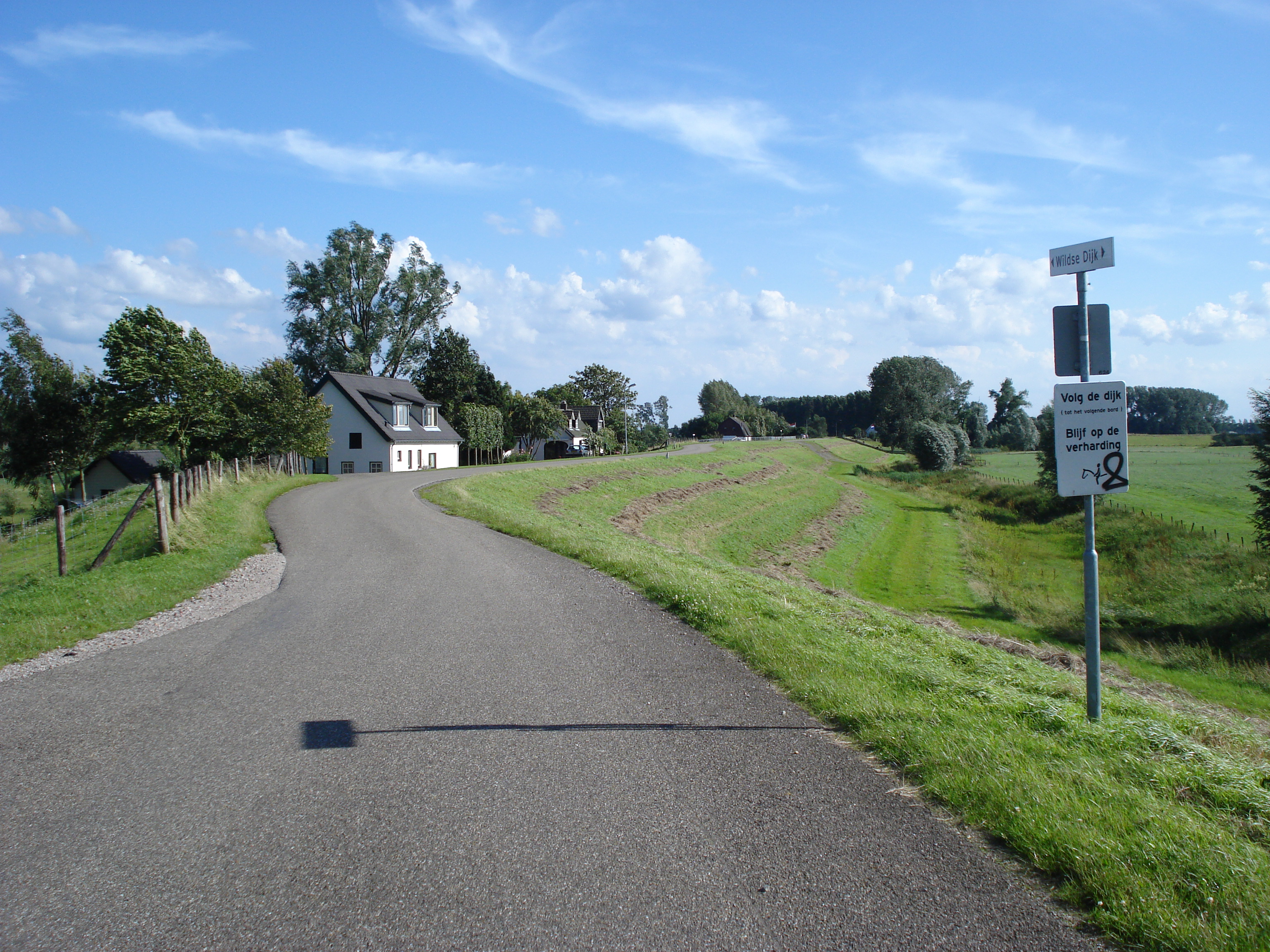

- Location in the province of North Brabant in the Netherlands Het Wild (Netherlands)
- Coordinates: 51.762289°N 5.370297°E
- Country: Netherlands
- Province: North Brabant
- Municipality: Oss

Area
  - Total: 0.71 km^{2} (0.27 sq mi)
- Elevation: 6 m (20 ft)

Population (2021)
  - Total: 105
  - Density: 150/km^{2} (380/sq mi)
- Time zone: UTC+1 (CET)
  - Summer (DST): UTC+2 (CEST)
- Postal code: 5398
- Dialing code: 0412

Het Wild is a village in the southern Netherlands, located in the municipality of Oss, North Brabant on the left bank of the river Meuse. Het Wild is a settlement without a church and the smallest inhabited place in the former municipality of Lith.

== History ==
=== 14th-19th century ===
There was a settlement near the Meuse in this area in the 14th century, a hamlet between Alem and Gewande.

At the end of the 18th century and in 1850, Het Wild had ten houses.

=== 20th century ===
By 1930 the hamlet had 23 houses, as well as a café which also served as the telephony and telegraphy station. For the church, school, and post office, locals had to travel to Alem, which at the time was still situated on the left bank of the Meuse.

During the Second World War, Het Wild was almost entirely razed. On 3 October 1944, the German SS gave the order for inhabitants of the village to leave with their possessions. The village was then burnt. On their return after the liberation, the villagers built a town again, a short distance from the suburbs. The new design was characteristic of the Delft school.

The area falls under the parish of Alem up to the point of the canalisation of the Meuse where Alem meets the bank. Then, the inhabitants go to church and to school in Maren-Kessel.

Until 1958, the hamlet was part of the former commune of Alem, Maren en Kessel. In 1958, this commune ceased to exist, and the land of the left bank of the Meuse, including Het Wild, became part of the commune of Lith.

The mouth of the Hertogswetering and the pumping station of Gewande are located in Het Wild. The former mouth and the former Hertogsgemaal pumping station are a short distance away in Gewande, 's-Hertogenbosch.

== Gallery ==
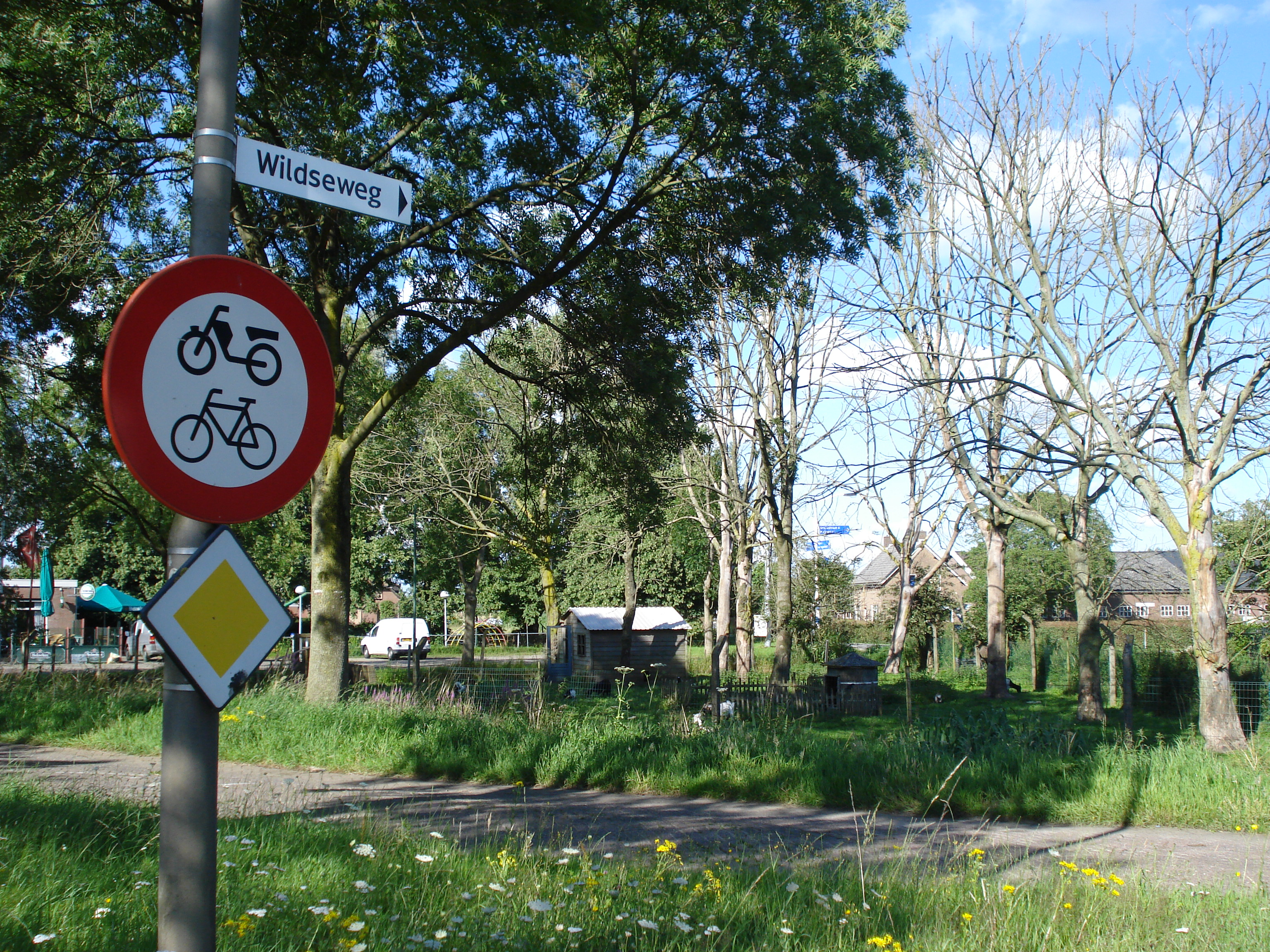
Het Wild centre

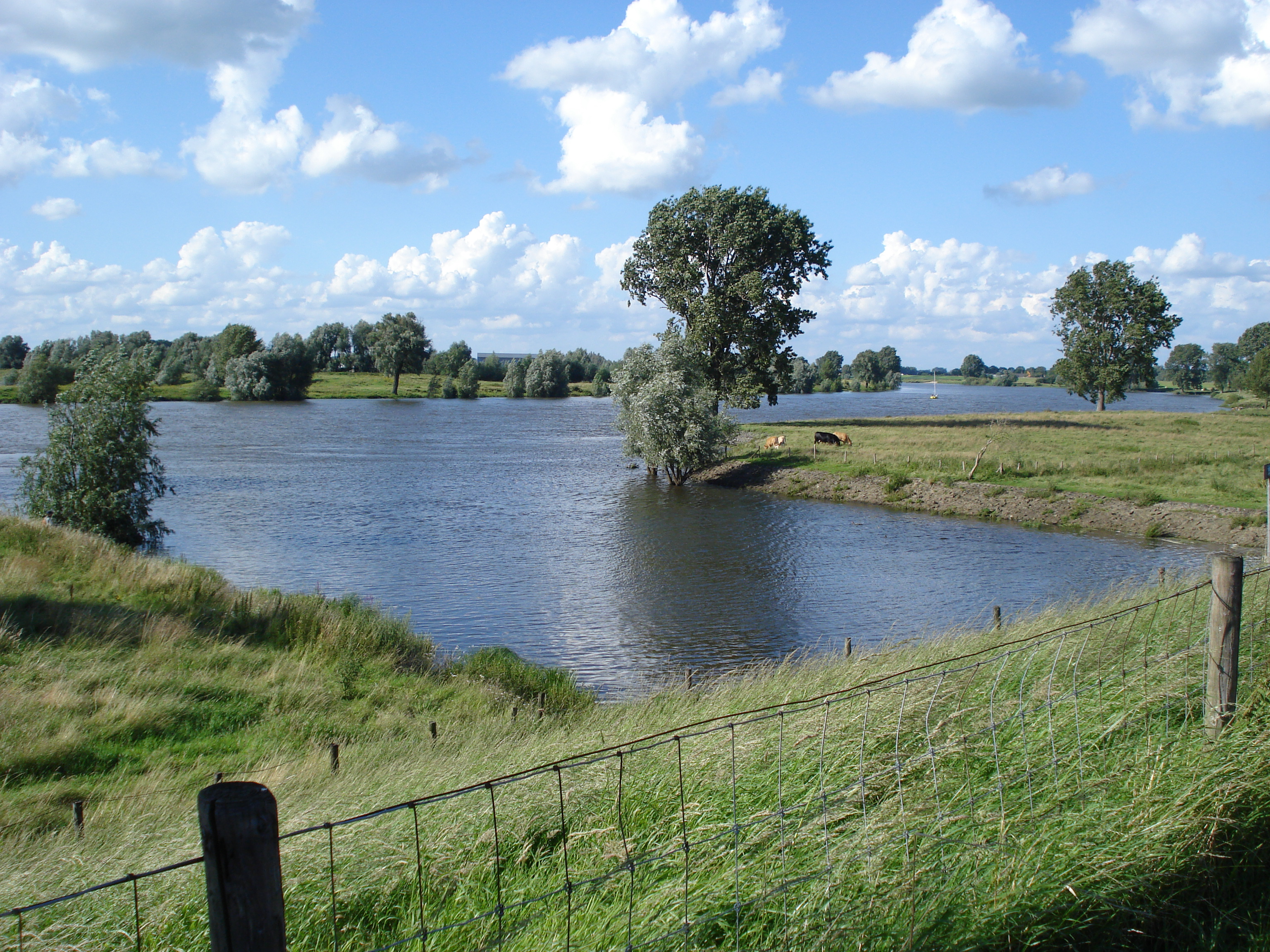
Het Wild, the Hertogswetering as it joins the Meuse

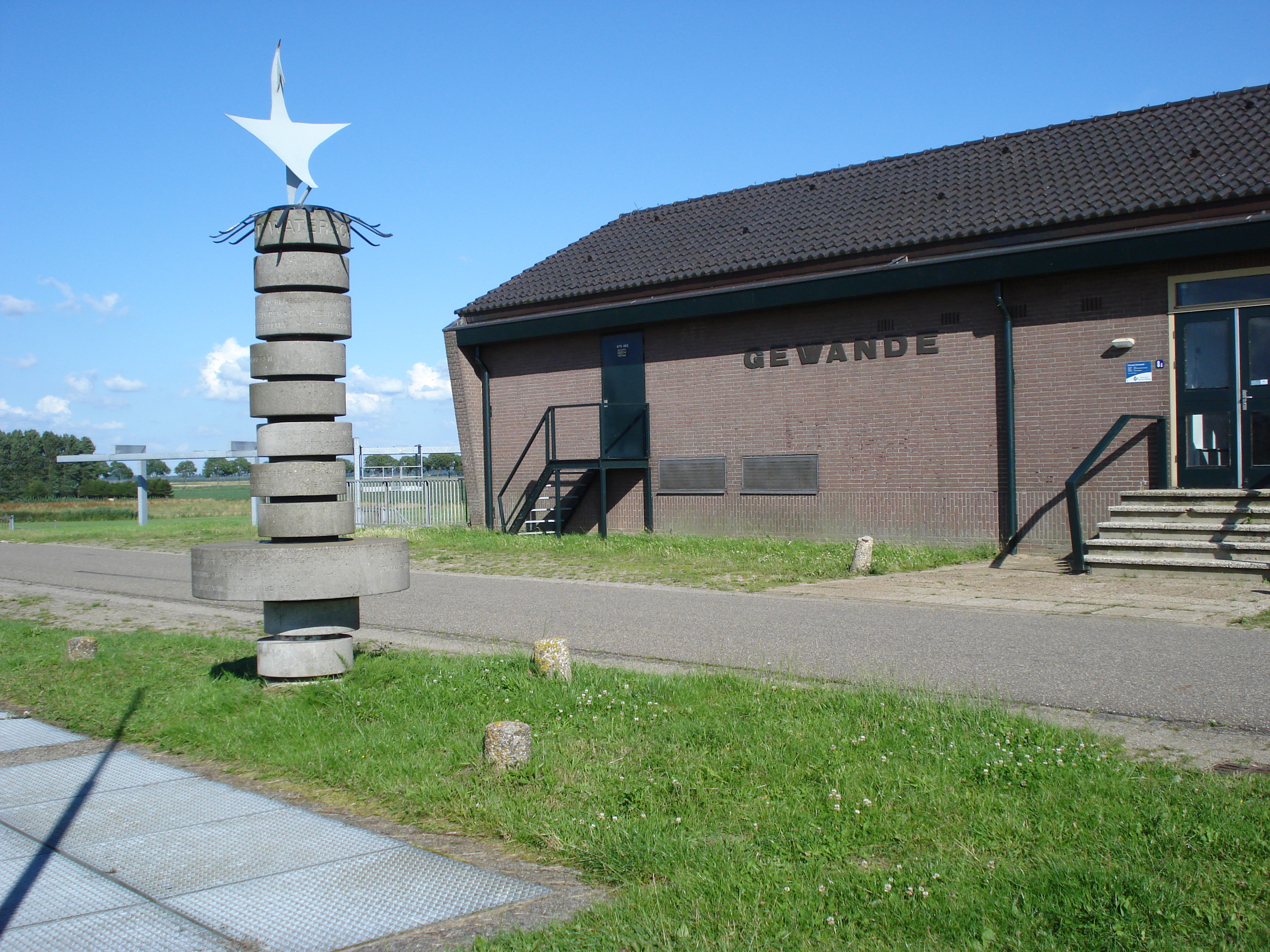
Het Wild, Gewande pumping station

== Sources ==
- Het Wild on the official site of Lith commune
