= Maren (energy management system) =

- Original author: Jón Ágúst Thorsteinsson
- Developer: Marorka
- Stable release: Maren 2.6 / April 2008
- Written in: C#
- Operating system: Windows XP
- Available in: English
- Type: Marine Energy Management System
- Website: www.marorka.com

Maren is a marine energy management system used to minimize fuel usage, reducing vessel operators' fuel costs and harmful emissions. Maren is developed by Marorka in Iceland. Maren 2 was released in Q3 2005 and launched at the Icelandic Fisheries Exhibition that year. Maren 2 was awarded the best new product at the exhibition.

Maren monitors the various energy systems onboard different types of vessels. It puts operating en environmental parameters in an energy management context. Maren uses simulation and optimization to deliver suggestions on how to improve the operation of the vessel to minimize fuel usage.

== See also ==
- Fuel management systems
