= Kessel =

Kessel may refer to:

== Places ==
- Kessel, Belgium
- Kessel-Lo, Belgium
- Kessel, Germany, part of Goch
- Kessel, Limburg, Netherlands
- Kessel, North Brabant, Netherlands
- Kessel, West Virginia, United States
- Kessel (river), a river in Bavaria, Germany

== People ==
- Kessel (surname)

== Other uses ==
- Kessel, a pocket of encircled military units
- KFC Kessel, a Belgian football team
- Kessel Food Markets, a defunct grocery store chain
- Kessel (Star Wars), a planet in the Star Wars franchise

== See also ==
- Kessels
- Kettle (disambiguation)
- Kessler (name)
