= Lithoijen =

- Village
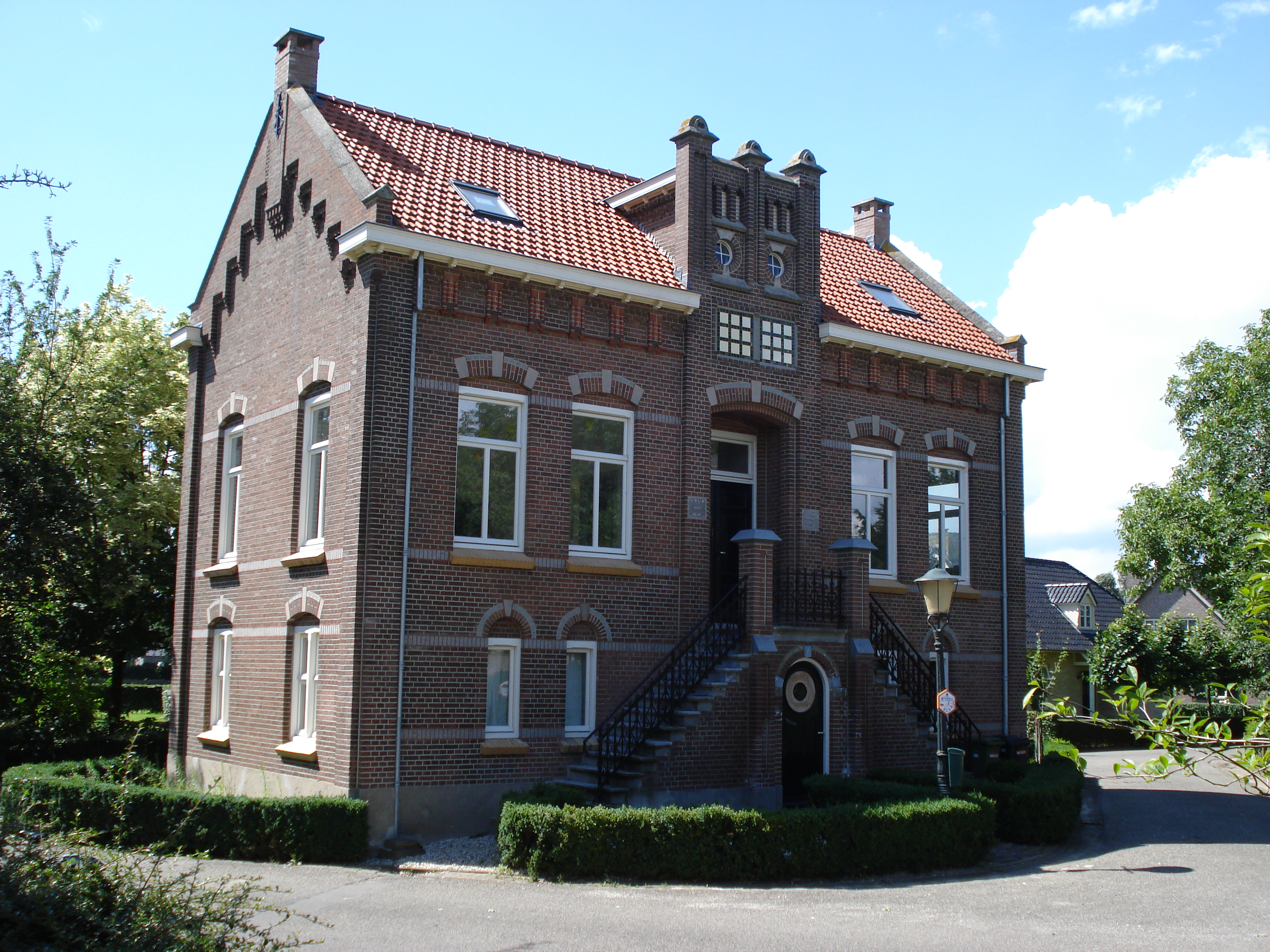
- Former town hall

- Location in the province of North Brabant in the Netherlands Lithoijen (Netherlands)
- Coordinates: 51°48′9″N 5°27′48″E
- Country: Netherlands
- Province: North Brabant
- Municipality: Oss

Area
  - Total: 9.05 km^{2} (3.49 sq mi)
- Elevation: 5.1 m (17 ft)

Population (2021)
  - Total: 840
  - Density: 93/km^{2} (240/sq mi)
- Time zone: UTC+1 (CET)
  - Summer (DST): UTC+2 (CEST)
- Postal code: 5396
- Dialing code: 0412

Lithoijen is a village in the Dutch province of North Brabant. It is located in the municipality of Oss, about 5 km northwest of the city of Oss.

== History ==
The village was first mentioned between 987 and 996 as Littam, and means "land on a river near Lith".

The Catholic St. Remigus Church was built between 1900 and 1901. The tower has a slender needle spire. The former Franciscan monastery was built around 1895 in Gothic Revival style. Until 1950, it housed a girls boarding school. In 1833, a fort was built in Lithoijen, because an attack was feared during the Belgian Revolution. It was never used, and decommissioned in 1886. Only elevations in the landscape reveal its presence.

Lithoijen was home to 735 people in 1840. Lithoijen was a separate municipality until 1939, when it became part of Lith. In 2011, it became part of the municipality of Oss.

== Gallery ==
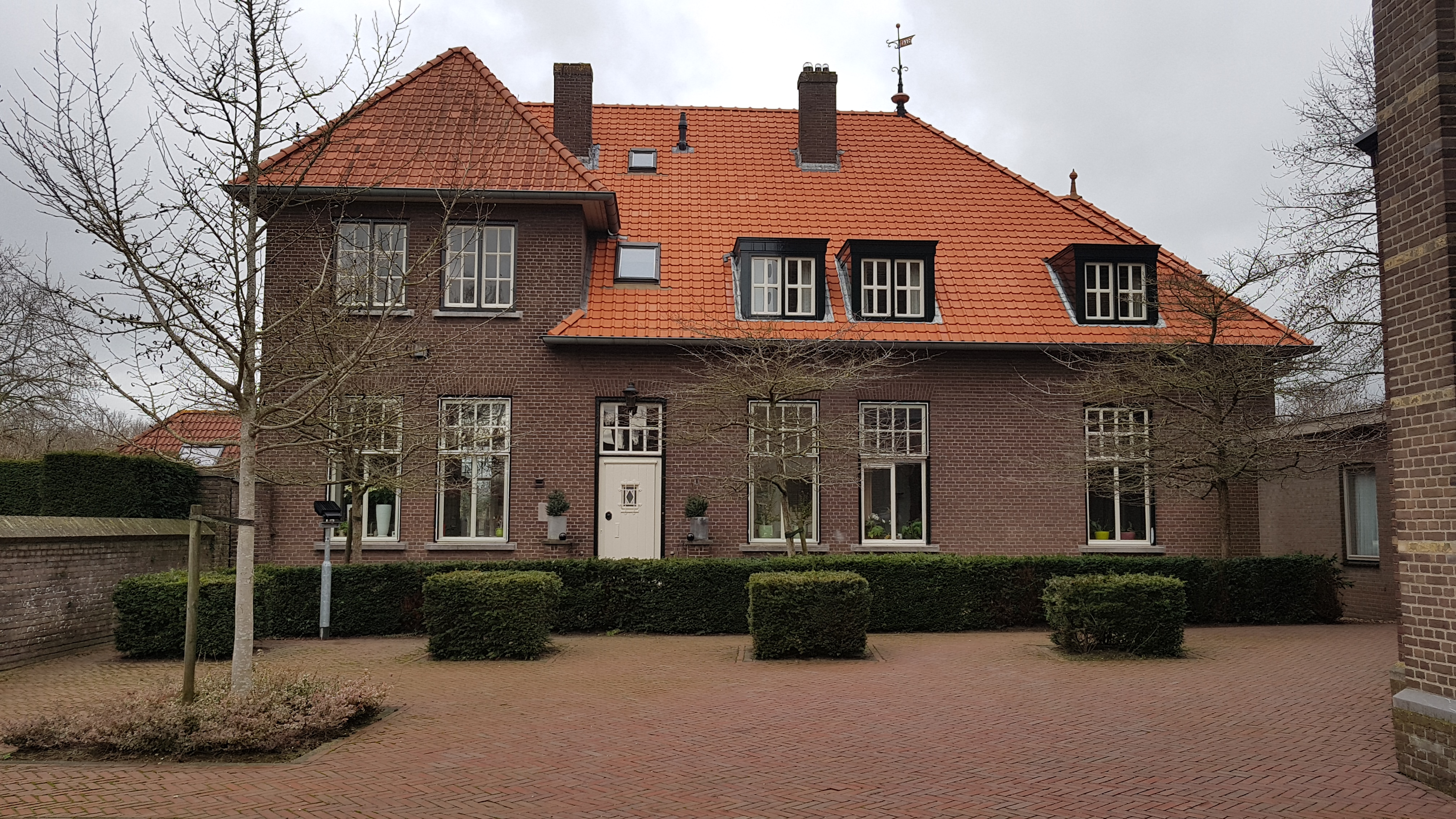
Building in Lithoijen

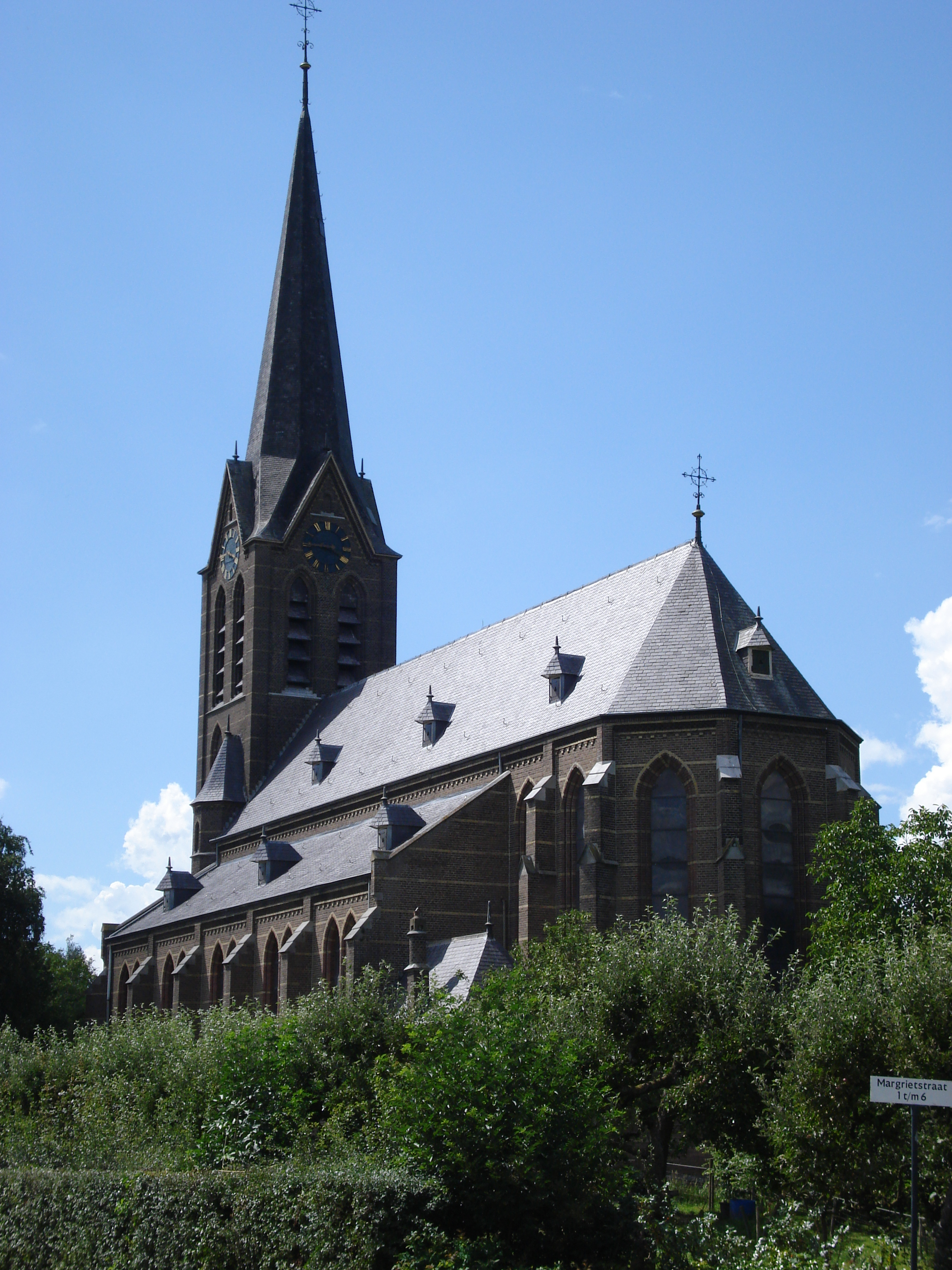
St Remigus Church

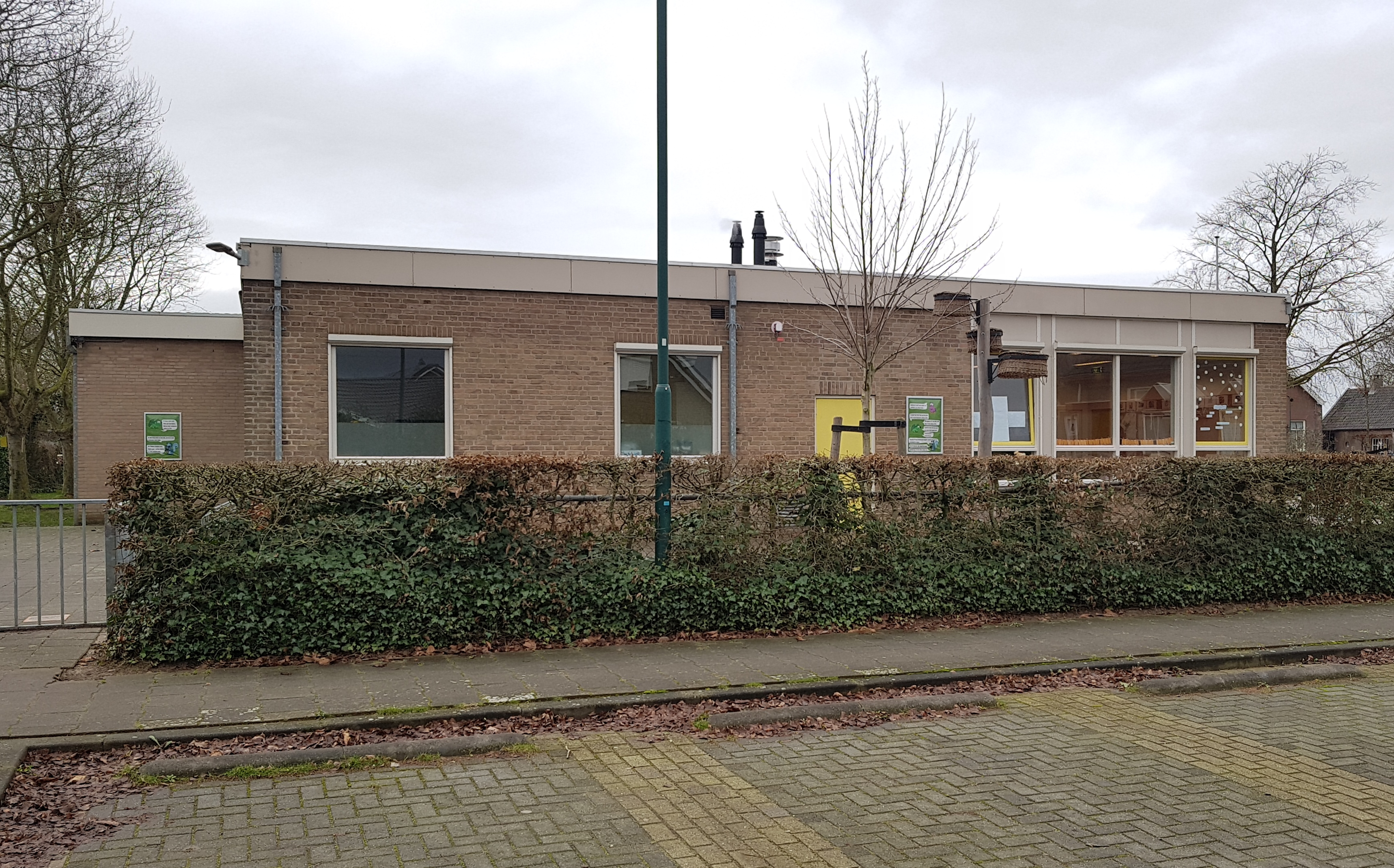
School in Lithoijen

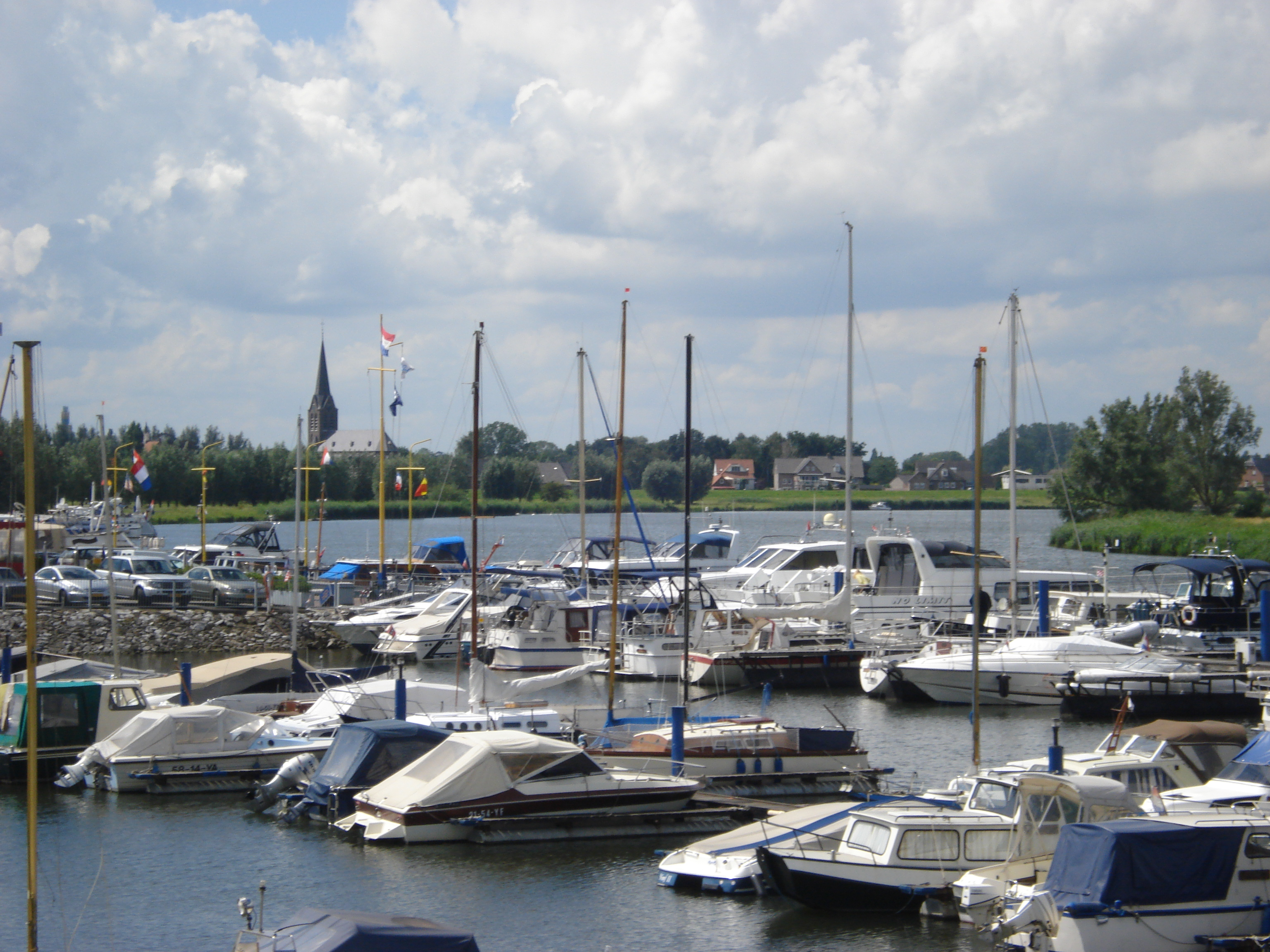
Marina
