= Eniram =

Finnish Software Company

- Type: subsidiary company, 70+ employees
- Industry: marine energy management, clean-tech
- Founded: 2005
- Headquarters: Helsinki, Finland
- Key people: Mikko Ahola, co-founder, Ville Leino, co-founder, Jussi Pyörre, co-founder, Henrik Dahl, co-founder and CEO
- Products: vessel energy management systems
- Website: www.eniram.fi

Eniram Oy, founded in 2005, is a Finnish clean-tech software engineering company which specializes in marine energy management products and services for ship-owners and operators of commercial vessels, ranging from cruise ships, bulk carriers, container ships, LNG carriers and tankers.

The company’s onboard and on-shore energy management systems provide ship-owners and operators with insight for cutting harmful emissions, increasing fuel efficiency, driving operational change and optimizing overall ship and fleet performance. Headquartered in Helsinki, Finland, Eniram employs software designers, naval architects and ship captains.

On 1 July 2016, Eniram was bought by the Finnish engine and maritime company Wärtsilä.

== History ==
- 2005: Eniram Oy is established in Helsinki; first employees come on board.
- 2007: trim optimization trials with Royal Caribbean International, Norwegian Cruise Line and Carnival Cruise Lines, three of the world’s largest cruise ship companies
- 2008: first trim optimization deal; first container ship customer; Eniram US offices open.
- 2009: first tanker ship customer (trim optimization).
- 2010: first fleet performance offering; UK office opens.
- 2011: Singapore office is established, Eniram #1 on the Deloitte Fast 50 Awards list.
- 2012: first speed and engine optimization customers.
- 2013: German offices open, expansion to Japan and Middle East
- 2014: Eniram named European Cleantech Company of the Decade
- 2016: Eniram bought by Wärtsilä.

== Awards ==
- Slush names Eniram in Top 50 companies list.
- The 2014 Global Cleantech 100 Companies
- Startup100 ranks Finnish startups monthly based on online marketing activities and performance. Eniram is listed in the Top 100 for October 2014
- Winner of the 2014 Fathom Shipping Energy Efficiency Award
- Avaus: Eniram #9 on the “Smartest Companies in Finland” list

== See also ==
- Fuel efficiency
- Energy engineering
