= Kestelman =

Kestelman is a surname. Notable people with the surname include:

- Larry Kestelman (born 1966), Australian billionaire
- Morris Kestelman (1905–1998), British artist and teacher
- Sara Kestelman (born 1944), English actress

== See also ==
- Kesselman
