= Wärtsilä =

Finnish energy and marine technology company

Wärtsilä Corporation
- Native name: Wärtsilä Oyj Abp
- Type: Public (Julkinen osakeyhtiö)
- Traded as: Nasdaq Helsinki: WRT1V
- Industry: Manufacturing and service
- Founded: 12 April 1834; 192 years ago
- Headquarters: Helsinki, Finland
- Key people: Tom Johnstone (Chairman); Håkan Agnevall (President and CEO)
- Products: Power plants, marine propulsion systems, maintenance services
- Revenue: ▲€6.914 billion (2025)
- Operating income: ▲€402 million (2023)
- Net income: ▲€364 million (2023)
- Total assets: ▲€6.803 billion (2023)
- Total equity: ▲€2.225 billion (2023)
- Number of employees: ▲17,666 (2023 average)
- Website: www.wartsila.com

Wärtsilä Oyj Abp (Finnish: [ˈʋærtsilæ]), trading internationally as Wärtsilä Corporation, is a Finnish company which manufactures and services power sources and other equipment in the marine and energy markets. The core products of Wärtsilä include technologies for the energy sector, including gas, multi-fuel, liquid fuel and biofuel power plants and energy storage systems; and technologies for the marine sector, including cruise ships, ferries, fishing vessels, merchant ships, navy ships, special vessels, tugs, yachts and offshore vessels. Ship design capabilities include ferries, tugs, and vessels for the fishing, merchant, offshore and special segments. Services offerings include online services, underwater services, turbocharger services, and also services for the marine, energy, and oil and gas markets. At the end of December 2023, the company employed 17,800 workers.

Wärtsilä has two main businesses; Energy Business focusing on the energy market, and Marine Business focusing on the marine market. The Marine Business is mainly present in Europe, China and East Asia, while its key Energy Business markets are South and South East Asia, the Middle East, Africa and Latin America. Wärtsilä has locations in around 80 countries, including the US, Brazil, Finland, Germany, South Africa, Singapore and China, but operates globally.

The company has signalled its intention to transform from an equipment maker to a smart marine and energy company, following acquisitions of companies such as Transas, Greensmith, Guidance Marine, and MSI, and the setting-up of "digital acceleration centres" in Helsinki, Singapore, Central Europe, and North America.

In 2023, Time named Wärtsilä one of the 100 most influential companies in the world.

== History ==
=== Origins ===
Wärtsilä was established when the governor of the county of North Karelia approved the construction of a sawmill in the municipality of Tohmajärvi, Grand Duchy of Finland on 12 April 1834. The sawmill was soon taken over by industrialist Nils Ludvig Arppe, who built ironworks in the premises. In 1898 the company was renamed Wärtsilä Ab.

=== Diesel engines ===
In 1938 the diesel engine era began when Wärtsilä signed a licence agreement with Friedrich Krupp Germania Werft AG in Germany. The first diesel engine was produced in Turku, Finland in November 1942. During the following decades more focus was put on manufacturing diesel and gas engines with the acquisitions of the Swedish firm NOHAB in 1978, the French Société Alsacienne de Constructions Mécaniques (SACM), and the Dutch Stork-Werkspoor in 1989.

In 1997 Wärtsilä absorbed the diesel motor producing New Sulzer Diesel (NSD), which had been created by Sulzer in 1990.

In 2015, Wärtsilä divested its two stroke engine portfolio into a joint venture named WinGD, which was fully divested in 2016. At least some of these engines such as the Wärtsilä RT-flex68-D, were manufactured under licence by manufacturers in Korea such as Hyundai Heavy Industries and Doosan. Under WinGD, some engines are also manufactured by Mitsui E&S Diesel United, and formerly IHI.

=== Hybrid engines ===
In 2020, Wärtsilä made plans to supply hybrid engine solutions for Finnlines.

=== Expanding portfolio ===
Through acquisitions of marine propulsion systems supplier John Crane-Lips in 2002, marine automation company Total Automation in 2006, specialist equipment company Hamworthy in 2012 and L-3 Marine Systems International in 2014, Wärtsilä expanded their portfolio considerably.

== Marine market ==
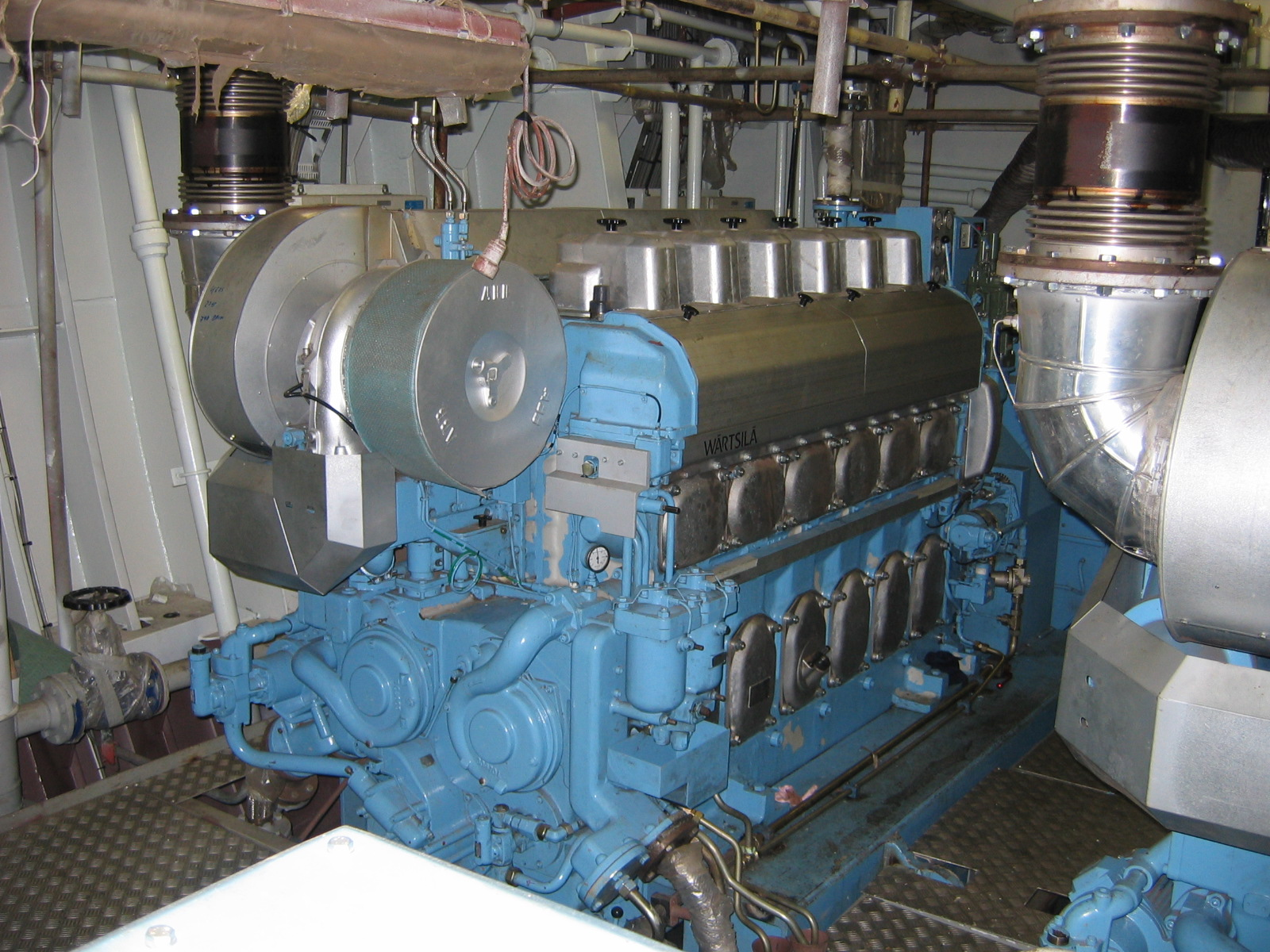
6L20 auxiliary engine in marine service

The company services the merchant, offshore, cruise and ferry, naval, fishing, tugs, yachts and special vessel markets, and the offering includes ship design, main and auxiliary engines, auxiliary power systems, electrical and automation packages, propulsors (such as water jets, thrusters, propellers, and nozzles), seals, bearings, gears, rudders, scrubbers, boilers, and all related services, such as repair, configuration, upgrading, training, maintenance, and environmental services.

Customers comprise both shipyards and ship owners. The environmental products range from reduction of air emissions, such as NOx, SOx, CO, and volatile organic compounds (VOCs), to oily waste water treatment and other water systems such as ballast water management systems.

Wärtsilä was an important Finnish shipbuilder from 1935 until 1989, building cruiseferries, cruise ships and a large share of the icebreakers of the world. The former Wärtsilä Marine Turku Shipyard is now owned by Meyer Werft under its Meyer Turku subsidiary and the Helsinki shipyard is operated by a company of the same name owned by the Canadian Davie Shipbuilding.

== Energy equipment market ==
Wärtsilä is a provider of power plants in distributed and flexible power generation. The product portfolio consists of installations up to 600 MW, running on any gaseous or liquid fuels, such as Heavy fuel oil, natural gas, liquefied natural gas (LNG), different types and qualities of fuel oils, and renewable fuels like biogas and biofuel. In addition for the reliability of traditional base power generation, the engines have the capability to start and stop quickly and they maintain their efficiency in part load, which makes them well suited for peaking power production, smart grids, and emergency power systems. They can also utilize the combined cycle and cogeneration to produce steam or hot water for heating, and trigeneration for chilled water, which can be used for air conditioning.

Wärtsilä also provides products and services for grid stability management, utilization of gas flares, pumping applications (such as pump and compression drives), financial services, and project management services for projects concerning power generation.

In 2016, Wärtsilä signed an agreement to acquire Greensmith Energy Management Systems Inc.

In March 2018, the company announced that it had delivered the world's largest solar hybrid power plant, situated in Burkina Faso.

Wärtsilä provides about 25 percent of Bangladesh's total grid capacity, with the company's total power supply to Bangladesh rising to more than 4200 MW when a 105MW power plant being built by Baraka Shikalbaha Power Ltd goes fully operational in spring 2019.

Wärtsilä's wide energy products and systems footprint includes the US, Germany, the UK, China, Russia, Singapore, Bangladesh, India, Indonesia, Myanmar, Senegal, the Dominican Republic, Australia, Saudi Arabia, Tanzania, Morocco, Argentina, Sierra Leone, Brazil, Finland, Mauritius, Rwanda, Honduras, El Salvador, Kazakhstan, Mexico, Jordan and Oman.

=== Battery Storage ===
After acquiring Greensmith in 2017, Wärtsilä entered the global battery storage market as Wärtsilä Energy Storage and Optimisation (ES&O). Its energy storage business reached profitability in 2023. Wärtsilä ES&O's offering includes battery energy storage system (BESS) hardware through its Quantum portfolio, a controls and optimisation software with GEMS Digital Energy Platform, and lifecycle services.

== Services Market ==
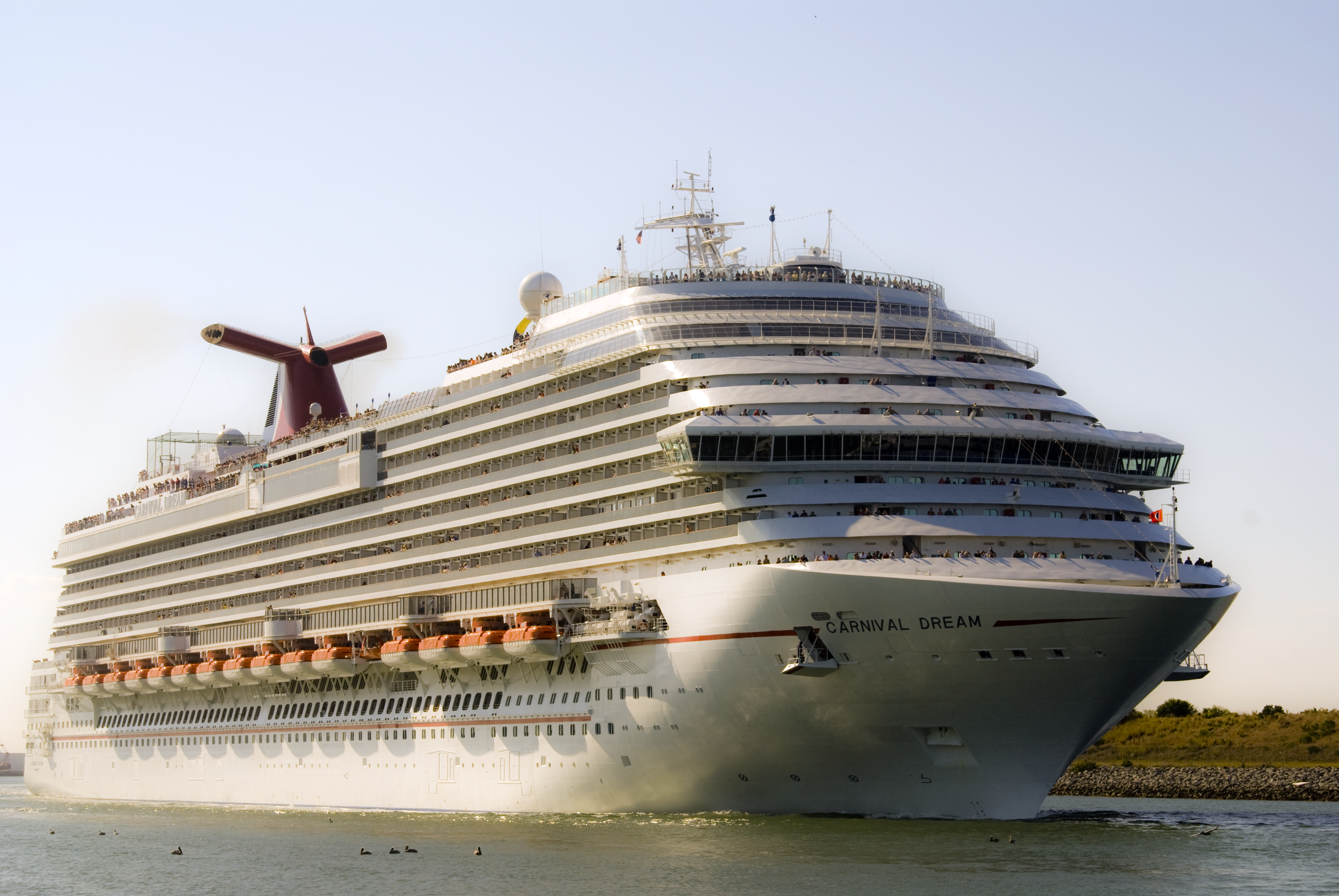
Carnival Dream

The wholly owned service network consists of over 4,500 field service professionals in more than 160 locations in over 70 countries globally, with the installed base of over 180 000 MW. The focus lies on optimising operations and life cycle performance of land based power plants and ship installations.

Wärtsilä provides services, spare parts, maintenance, upgrades, and fuel conversions products for medium and low-speed gas and diesel engines and other related systems, propulsion systems, electrical & automation systems, boilers including environmental solutions regarding particulates and NOx, covering scrubber, selective catalytic reduction (SCRs), oxidation catalysts, ballast water treatment systems and oily-water systems, long-term service agreements, training, condition monitoring, and condition-based maintenance and advisory services.

In January 2017, Wärtsilä and Carnival Corporation announced a 12-year performance-based agreement worth 900 million euros.

Acquisitions in the services business include Eniram in 2016, Trident B.V in 2017, and Lock-N-Stich.

On 1 October 2018, Wärtsilä announced that it would reorganize into two business areas, incorporating the Services business into the existing Marine and Energy businesses.

== Market share and competitors ==
At the end of 2023, Wärtsilä's market share in marine medium-speed main engines was 46% and in auxiliary engines 17%. At the end of 2023 Wärtsilä's market share for gas and liquid fuel power plants was 13%.

Wärtsilä's biggest competitors in the marine market are MAN Energy Solutions, Caterpillar Inc. and Kongsberg Gruppen. Key competitors in the energy market include General Electric, Siemens, Mitsubishi Heavy Industries and Ansaldo Energia. When it comes to energy storage systems, Wärtsilä's main competitors include Tesla, Inc and Fluence Energy.

== Engines ==
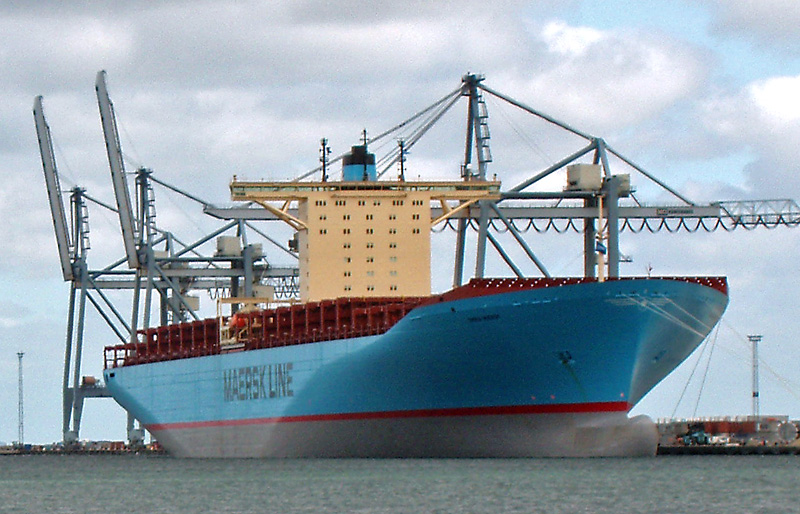
Emma Mærsk is powered by a single low-speed Wärtsilä-Sulzer RT-flex96C engine.

Wärtsilä produces a wide range of four-stroke medium-speed diesel, gas and dual- and multi-fuel engines for marine propulsion, electricity generation on board ships and for land-based power stations. The engine models are identified by the cylinder bore diameter in centimeters, which as of 2024 range from 20 to 46 centimetres (7.9 to 18.1 inches). The smallest engine series, Wärtsilä 20, produces a modest 200 to 220 kW (270 to 300 hp) per cylinder and is available in inline configurations from 4 to 9 cylinders. The largest engine series, Wärtsilä 46F, produces up to 1,200 kW (1,600 hp) per cylinder and is available in both inline and vee configurations, with up to 16 cylinders for marine use and 20 cylinders for land-based power plants. In the past, Wärtsilä also produced the most powerful medium-speed engine series in the world, Wärtsilä 64, with an output of 2,150 kW (2,880 hp) per cylinder. In 2015, the Wärtsilä 31 engine achieved a Guinness World Records title for the most efficient 4-stroke diesel engine.

A joint venture agreement between Wärtsilä and China State Shipbuilding Corporation (CSSC) for the take-over of Wärtsilä's 2-stroke engine business was announced in July 2014 and finalized in January 2015; until that time Wärtsilä had been building low-speed engines in inline configuration, with five (5RT-flex35) to fourteen cylinders (14RT-flex96C). The most powerful low-speed engine ever produced by Wärtsilä, a 14-cylinder version of the RT-flex96C, produces 80,080 kW (107,390 hp) and is used to propel the Mærsk E-class container ships.

Wärtsilä admitted to manipulating fuel consumption tests after an internal audit in 2016, saying that a few hundred engines had been affected. The company claimed that the customer impact of this manipulation had been marginal.

== Sustainability ==
Wärtsilä published its first environmental report in 2001, and first sustainability report in 2003.

The company signed the United Nations Global Compact initiative in 2009. Common rules and guidance for all employees on Wärtsilä's approach to responsible business practices are defined in the company's code of conduct. Supplier requirements on sustainability, traceability, and business continuity planning are set out in the company's supplier handbook.

Wärtsilä is included in several sustainability indices including the Dow Jones Sustainability Indices, FTSE4Good Index, Ethibel Sustainability Index (ESI) Excellence Europe, ECPI Indices, MSCI Global Sustainability Index Series, STOXX Global ESG Leaders index, and RobecoSAM Sustainability Yearbook.

== Key figures ==
Key figures of 2023:

- Order intake increased by 16% to EUR 7,070 million (6,074)
- Order book at the end of the period increased by 13% to EUR 6,694 million (5,906)
- Net sales increased by 3% to EUR 6,015 million (5,842)
- Operating result increased by EUR 427 million to EUR 402 million (-26), which represents 6.7% of net sales (-0.4)
- Basic earnings per share increased to 0.44 euro (-0.11)
- Cash flow from operating activities increased to EUR 822 million (-62)

All numbers are shown excluding non-recurring items and selling profits.

== See also ==
- Finnish maritime cluster
