= Kessel, North Brabant =

Kessel
- Village
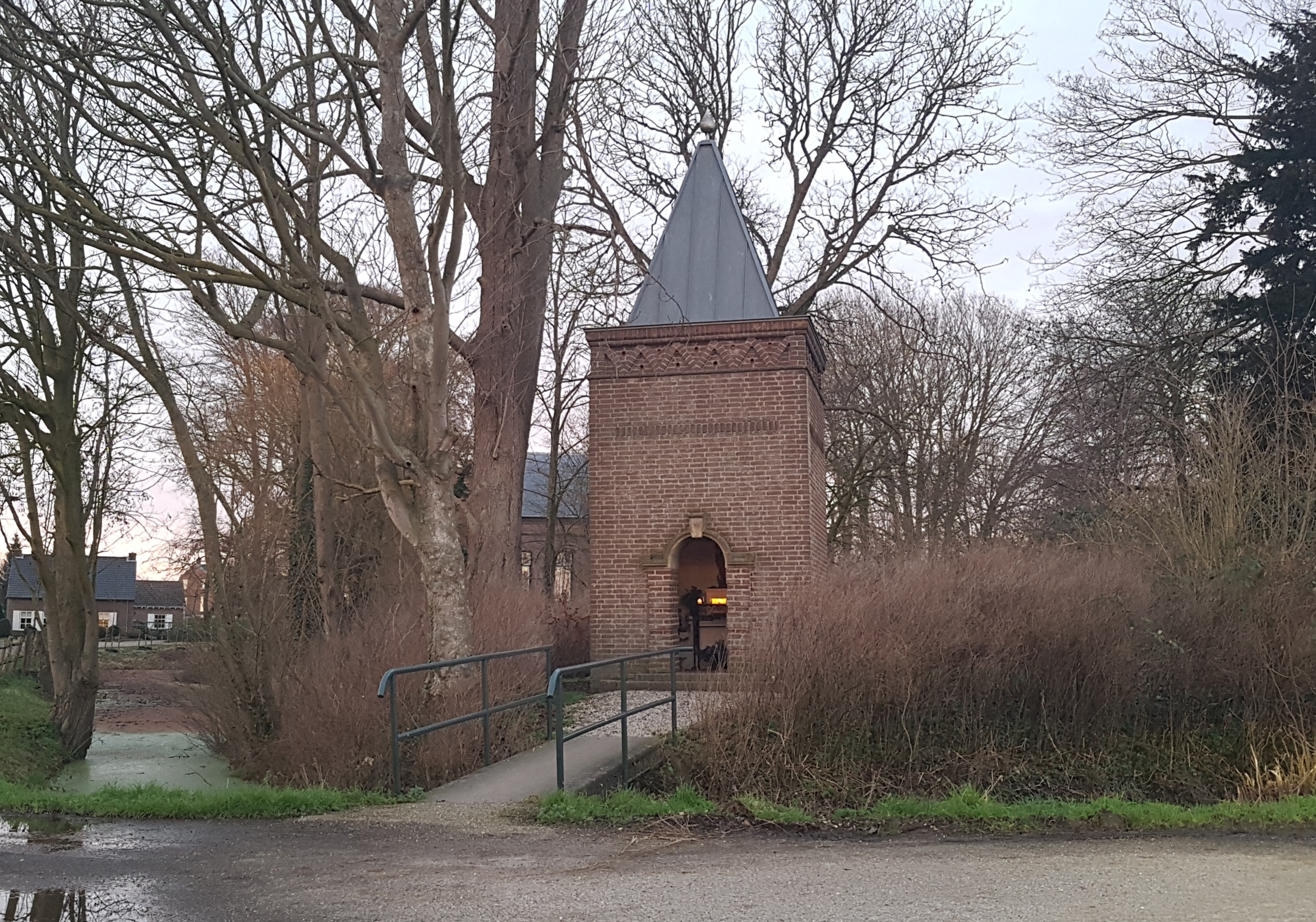
- Mary Chapel in Kessel

- Location in the province of North Brabant in the Netherlands Kessel (Netherlands)
- Coordinates: 51°48′13″N 5°24′15″E
- Country: Netherlands
- Province: North Brabant
- Municipality: Oss

Area
  - Total: 0.58 km^{2} (0.22 sq mi)
- Elevation: 6.4 m (21 ft)

Population (2021)
  - Total: 720
  - Density: 1,200/km^{2} (3,200/sq mi)
- Time zone: UTC+1 (CET)
  - Summer (DST): UTC+2 (CEST)
- Postal code: 5398
- Dialing code: 0412

Kessel is a village in the southern Netherlands. It is located in Oss, North Brabant about 12 km northeast of 's-Hertogenbosch on the river Maas.

The village was first mentioned in 997 as Casella. It is derived from castle, but means little house.

Kessel was a separate municipality until 1821, when it became a part of Alem, Maren en Kessel. Kessel was home to 298 people in 1840. In 1944, the village of Kessel and neighbouring Maren were evacuated, and the church was destroyed during the fighting. After the war, a new village Maren-Kessel was built between the two villages. In 2011, it was merged into municipality of Oss.

== Gallery ==
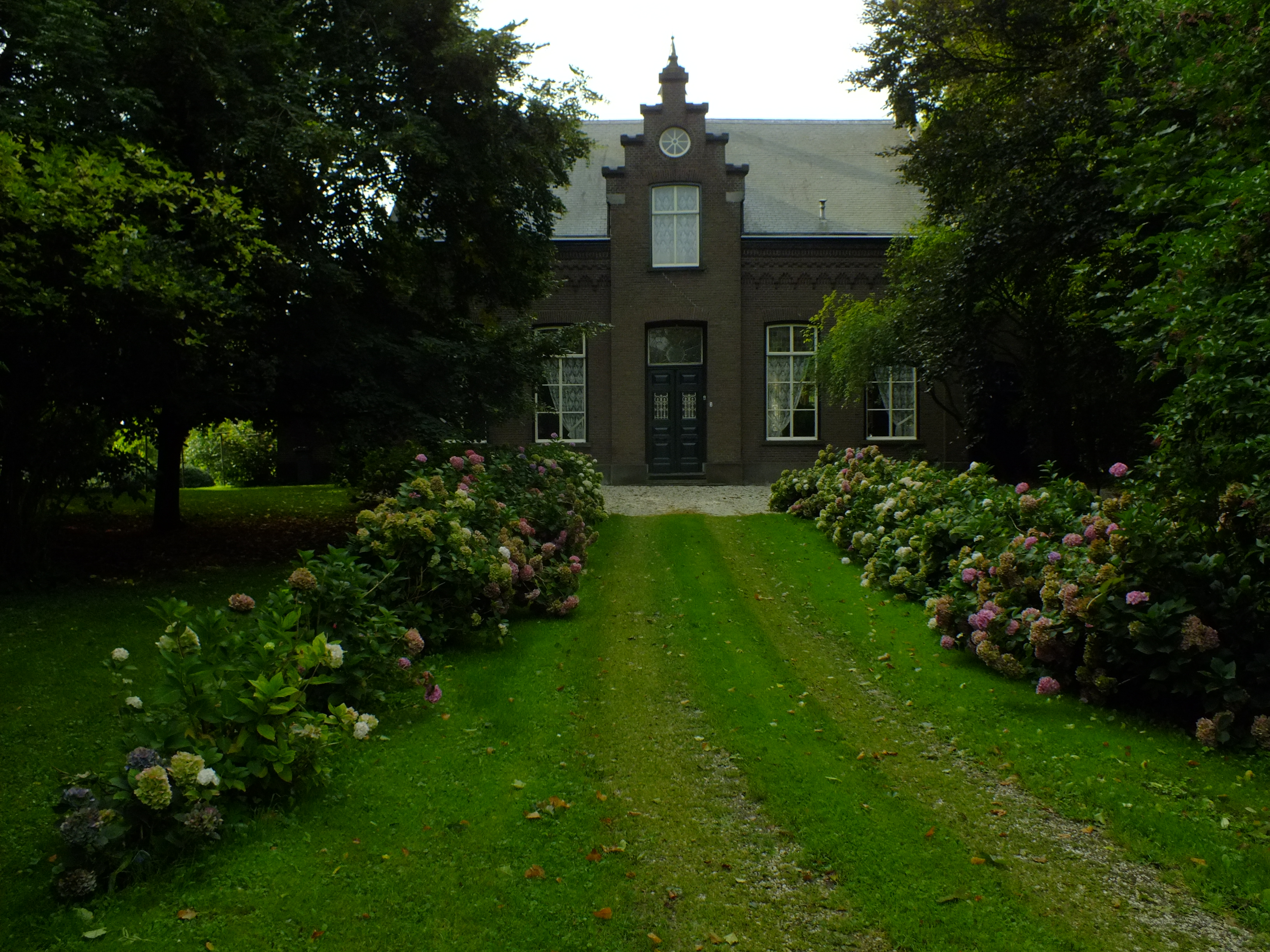
Clergy house

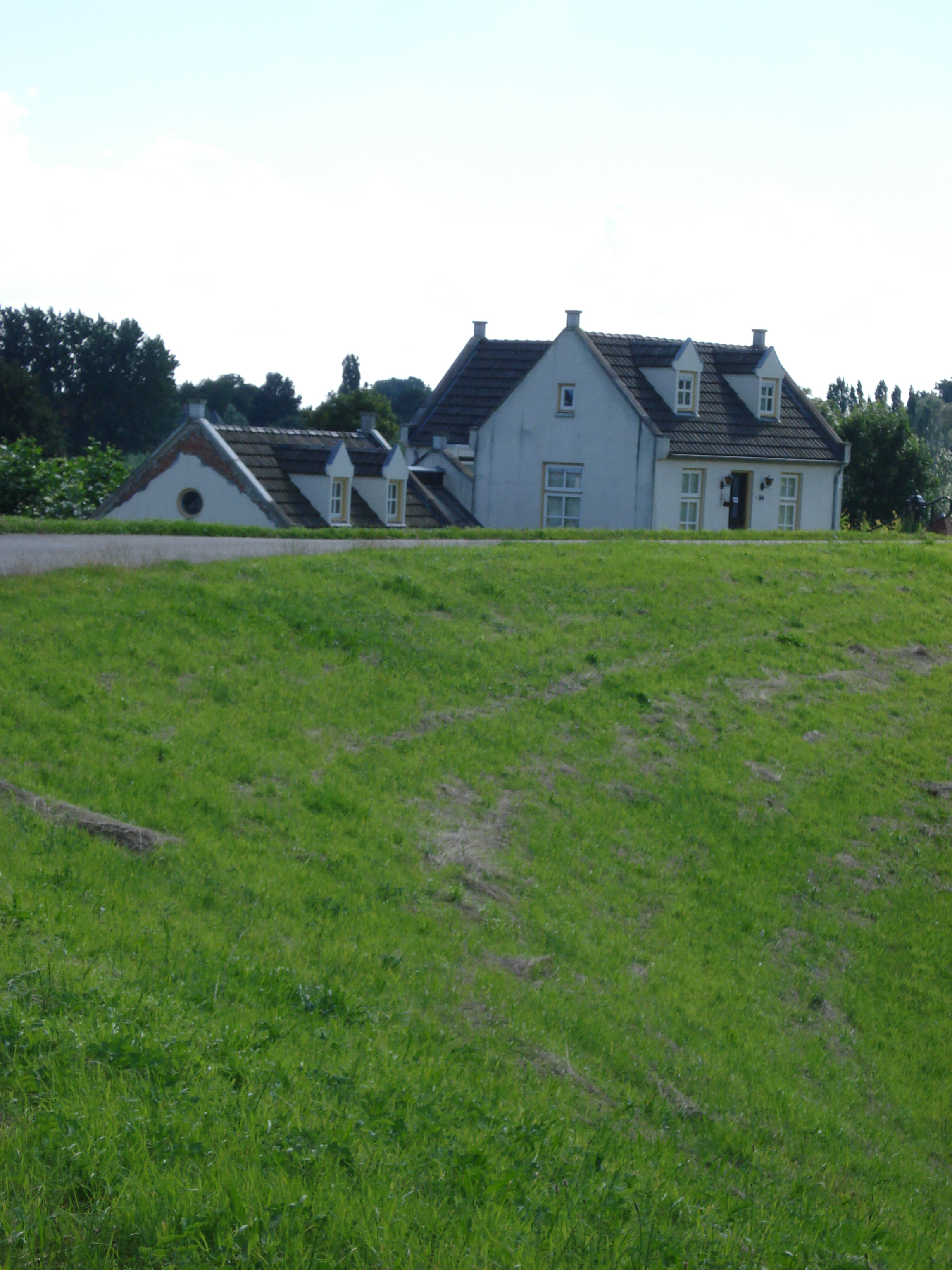
Houses along the dike
