= Marren =

Marren is a surname. Notable people with the surname include:

- Adrian Marren, Irish Gaelic footballer
- Amy Marren (born 1998), British Paralympic swimmer
- Enda Marren (1934–2013), Irish solicitor and member of the Irish Council of State

== See also ==
- Maren (disambiguation)
