= Maren (name) =

- Gender: Female
- Language: Germanic

Maren is a Germanic feminine given name that originated as a Danish variant of the name Marina.

Maren is also a surname.

Notable people with the name include:

== Given name ==
- Maren Ade (born 1976), German film director, screenwriter and producer
- Maren Elisabeth Bang (1797–1884), Norwegian cookbook writer
- Maren Baumbach (born 1981), German handball player
- Maren Brinker (born 1986), German volleyball player
- Maren Derlien (born 1975), German rower
- Maren Eggert (born 1974), German actress
- Maren Hammerschmidt (born 1989), German biathlete
- Maren Hassinger (born 1947), African-American sculpture artist
- Maren Haugli (born 1985), Norwegian long track speed skater
- Maren Jensen (born 1956), American model and actress
- Maren Juel (1749–1815), Norwegian landowner
- Maren Kaminski (born 1979), German politician
- Maren Knebel (born 1985), German sprint canoer
- Maren Kock, (born 1990), German middle-distance runner
- Maren Kroymann (born 1949), German actress and singer
- Maren Lundby (born 1994), Norwegian ski jumper
- Maren Meinert (born 1973), German footballer
- Maren Mjelde (born 1989), Norwegian footballer
- Maren Morris (born 1990), American country singer, songwriter, and record producer
- Maren Niemeyer (born 1964), German journalist, author and documentary filmmaker
- Maren Ord (born 1981), Canadian singer-songwriter of rock and pop music
- Maren-Sofie Røstvig (1920–2014), Norwegian literary historian
- Maren Sars (1811–1898), Norwegian socialite
- Maren Schwerdtner (born 1985), German heptathlete
- Maren Seidler (born 1951), American track and field athlete
- Maren Skjøld (born 1993), Norwegian alpine skier
- Maren Steege (born 1982), German politician
- Maren Ueland (died 2018), Norwegian female murder victim
- Maren Westin, American basketball player

== Surname ==
- Jerry Maren (1920–2018), American actor
- Juan Marén (born 1971), Cuban wrestler
- Michael Maren (born 1955), American journalist and screenwriter
- Thomas H. Maren (1918–1999), American professor of medicine at the University of Florida

== Fictional characters ==
- Maren Yearly, a character played by actress Taylor Russell in Luca Guadagnino's film Bones and All

== See also ==
- Murders of Louisa Vesterager Jespersen and Maren Ueland, a 2018 crime that occurred in Morocco
- Marren
