= Marorka =

Icelandic marine energy management company

Marorka Ltd.
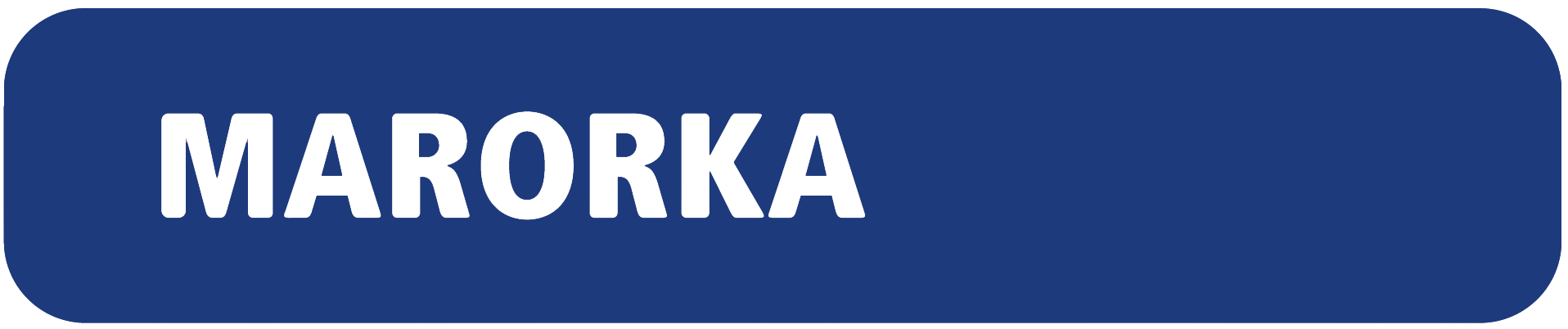
- Type: private limited company
- Industry: marine energy management, energy research
- Founded: 2002
- Headquarters: Reykjavík, Iceland
- Key people: Darri Gunnarsson, CEO; Gunnar Stefánsson, Director of Product Management; Haraldur Orri Björnsson, Director of Service
- Products: Marorka Onboard (energy management system), Marorka Online (energy management dashboard)
- Website: www.marorka.com

Marorka is a company which specializes in marine energy management. Marorka's head office is in Reykjavík, Iceland along with its servers and data storage infrastructure are supplied with electricity generated using 100% renewable energy resources – geothermal and hydroelectric. Marorka has international offices in Dubai, London and Shanghai. Mororka has an ISO 9001:2000 quality system, and is certified by Det Norske Veritas.

== Systems ==
Marorka has developed on-board and online energy management systems for the international shipping industry. Marorka's products and services enable vessel operators to optimize fuel consumption by maximizing the energy efficiency of their vessels through the implementation of real-time monitoring and decision support. Marorka's systems have been installed on board vessels of various types and sizes: Fishing vessels, Cargo vessels, Bulk carriers, LNG carriers, Cruise ships and Research vessels.

== Overview of work ==
Marorka's field of work:

- consultancy for vessel building
- operational analysis of ocean vessels
- development of Marorka Onboard (energy management system), the marine energy management system
- development of Marorka Online and Marorka Online SEEMP

== See also ==
- Marine energy management
- Fuel efficiency
- Energy Engineering
