= Kesselman =

Kesselman is a German and Yiddish surname of two possible origins. One is an occupational surname literally meaning "kettle-man", referring to one who made or repaired metal cooking vessels. Another is a toponymic surname, for a person associated with any places named Kessel. A variant is Kesselmann.

The surname may refer to:

- Alexis Kesselman, American music artist
- Carl Kesselman, American computing expert
- Harvey Kesselman, American academic administrator
- Jonathan Kesselman, American film director, screenwriter, and producer
- Wendy Kesselman, American playwright
