= Mathieu Kessels =

Dutch sculptor

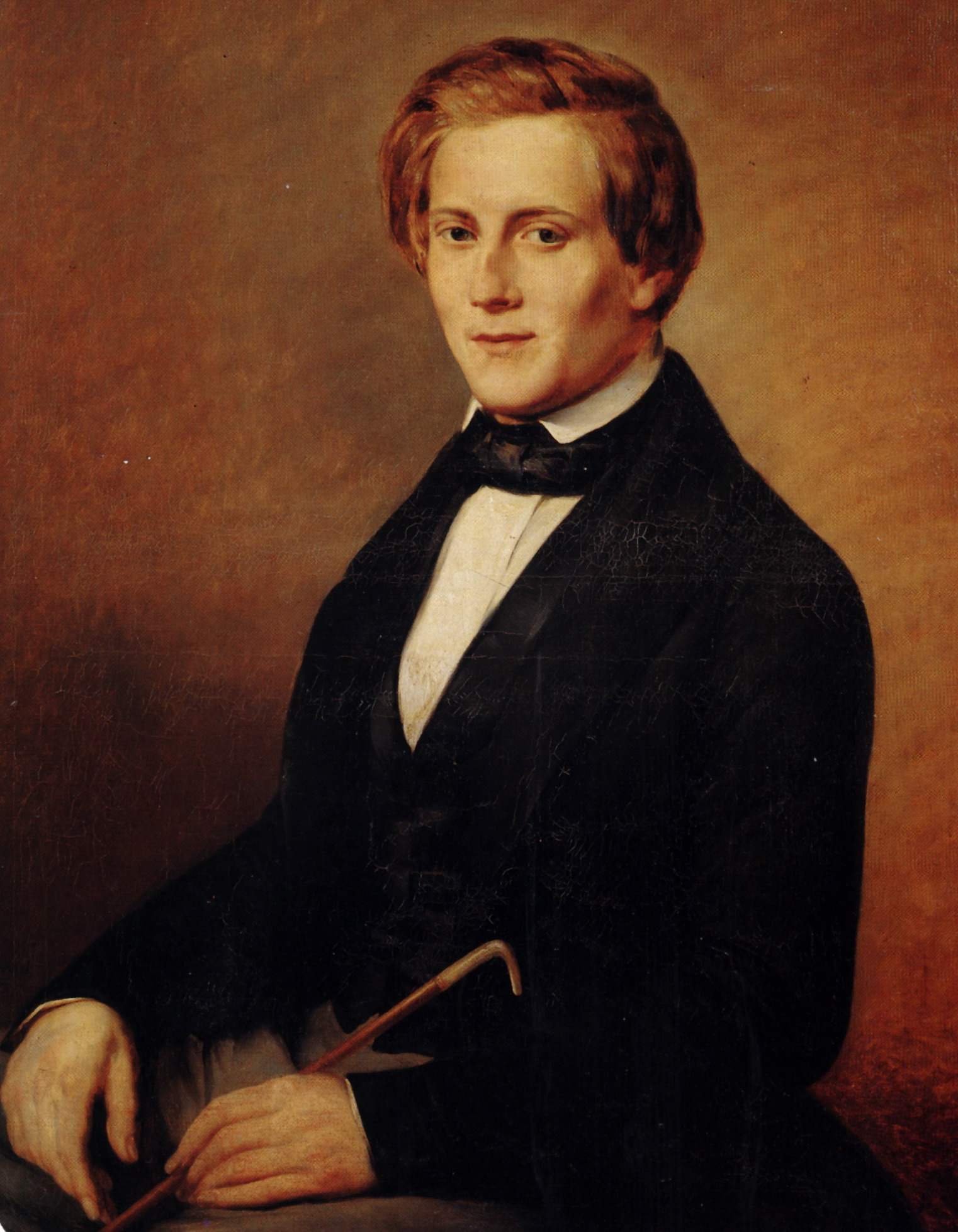
- Mathieu Kessels, about 40 years old, by unknown painter
- Born: 20 May 1784; Maastricht, Netherlands
- Died: 4 March 1836 (aged 51); Rome, Italy
- Education: Venlo, Paris, Hamburg, Saint Petersburg, Rome
- Known for: Sculpture
- Movement: Neoclassical
- Awards: Canova competition, Rome (1819); Order of the Netherlands Lion (1827)
- Patrons: Duke of Devonshire, Duke of Alba, King of Bavaria, King of the Netherlands

Mathieu Kessels (20 May 1784 – 4 March 1836) was a Dutch Neoclassical sculptor who mainly worked in Rome.

== Biography ==
Mathieu Kessels (also known as Matthias or Matthijs) was born the son of a carpenter in Maastricht. One of his brothers became an architect in Hamburg, whilst another (Hendrik Johan Kessels) became a famous clock maker in nearby Altona. Mathieu was first apprenticed to a goldsmith in Venlo but soon gave up his apprenticeship to attend the École des Beaux-Arts in Paris. In 1806 he made his way, via Hamburg, to Saint Petersburg where he abode eight years, learning how to make wax models and sculptures of various kinds in the workshop of Joseph Camberlain. In 1815 he returned briefly to Venlo and Maastricht. He then spent several months at Girodet's studio in Paris, where his work was exhibited at the Salon of 1819.

Being determined to go to Rome, he was accepted as an apprentice of the Danish sculptor Bertel Thorvaldsen, probably in 1818. In a competition for young artists, organized by Venetian sculptor Antonio Canova, Kessels in 1819 won the highest award with his terracotta Saint Sebastian pierced by arrows, a piece of frank and beautiful workmanship. In Rome he became a member, later professor of the Academy of St. Luke and of the Institute of the Netherlands. He also was a member of the academies in Amsterdam (from 1824 onwards) and Antwerp.

In Rome Kessels taught the Liege sculptors Louis Jehotte (c. 1803-84) and Eugène Simonis, who exerted an influence through their teaching at the Académie Royale des Beaux-Arts in Brussels. Another student of Kessels was the Dutch sculptor Johannes Antonius van der Ven, who sculpted his funeral stone.

Mattieu Kessels died in Rome while he was working on Saint Michael overcoming the Hydra of Anarchy for the Church of St. Michael and St. Gudula (now Brussels' cathedral). On Kessels's death his studio, having been inventoried by Thorvaldsen, was acquired by the Belgian government and transferred to the Royal Museums of Fine Arts of Belgium, Brussels. The museum now owns over 70 works by Kessels. Four plaster sculptures are permanently exhibited in the museum's neoclassical department: Discobole lançant le disque (1822–23), Génie funèbre éteignant un flambeau (c. 1829), Monument funeraire de la comtesse (1830–32) and Scène du déluge (c. 1836).

== Patrons ==
Among his numerous classically minded patrons was William Cavendish, 6th Duke of Devonshire, who commissioned two marble bas-reliefs, Day and Night (1819), and Diskobolos Preparing to Throw (1828), both in Chatsworth House. A bronze copy of his Diskobolos stands in the gardens of the Palais des Académies in Brussels. Another bronze copy is in the Rijksmuseum in Amsterdam. For Carlos Miguel Fitz-James Stuart, 14th Duke of Alba Kessels sculpted Reclining disk thrower, now in the Accademia Nazionale di San Luca in Rome, and Cupid whetting his darts.

In 1823 Ludwig I, the crown prince of Bavaria, visited him in his studio in Rome and ordered a marble bust of Admiral Tromp, which in 1845 was placed in the Walhalla memorial in Donaustauf, near Regensburg. Ludwig offered Kessels a position as director of the academy in Munich but Kessels remained in Rome. Another important patron was William I, King of the Netherlands for whom he sculpted Mars resting, a colossal marble now at the palace of Laeken, for which Kessels received the Order of the Netherlands Lion.

== Style evolution ==
Kessels is no longer regarded as a major artist, but in his lifetime he was famous. He belonged to the Rome school of neoclassical sculpture, founded by Canova and Thorvaldsen, along with Johann Gottfried Schadow, Albert Wolff and others, and adhered to idealist aesthetics and the classical canons. His pure neoclassical works, apart from some of the works mentioned above, include the marble busts of Marcus Aurelius, Cicero, Isis, and Gaius or Lucius Caesar (all 1817-19), The genius of Art (1820–23), Bacchus (1823–24), Woman weeping over an urn (1825) and Venus (1826–29).

In the late 1820s Kessels renounced some of the pure classicism of Thorvaldsen, for thestyle of Canova, mixed with the pathos of Italian Baroque. This is the case with his marble monument to the Countess of Celles (Rome, Chiesa di San Giuliano dei Fiamminghi, 1828). In another large sculpture, Flood Scene (plaster, c. 1833), the romantic emphasis of this work differentiates it from some of the other works of his late period, which are imbued with religious sentimentality, such as a sculpture of Christ at the Column, a bas relief of the head of Christ, a Pietà, and busts of Christ, the Virgin Mary and the four evangelists.

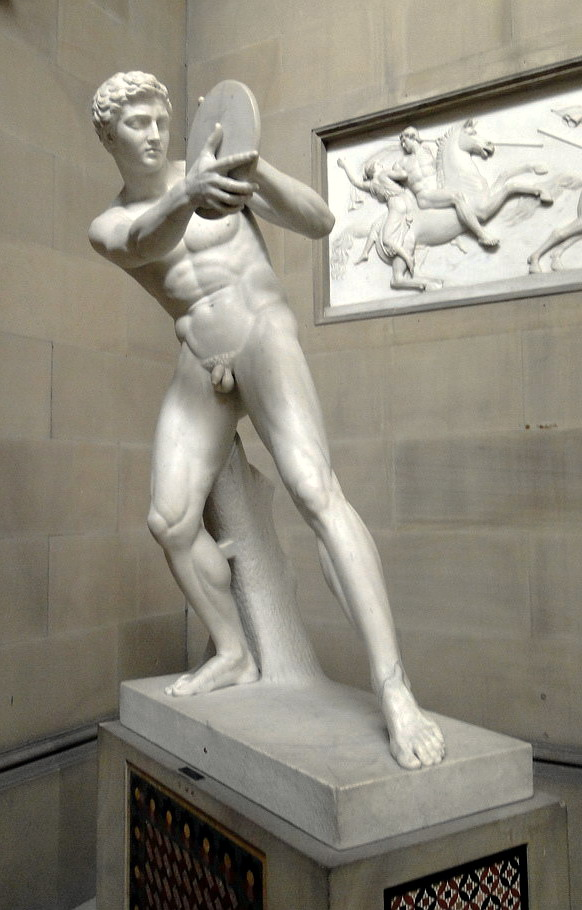
Diskobolos preparing to throw, Chatsworth House

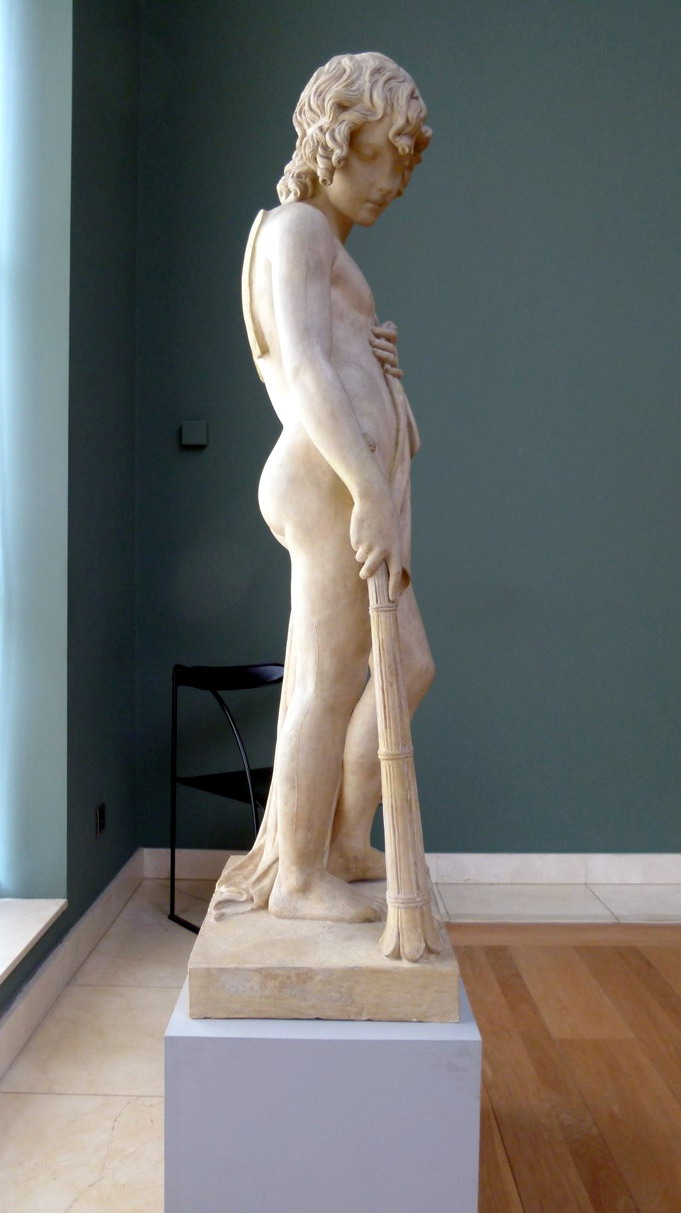
Genie of death putting out the flame, Royal Museums of Fine Arts of Belgium, Brussels

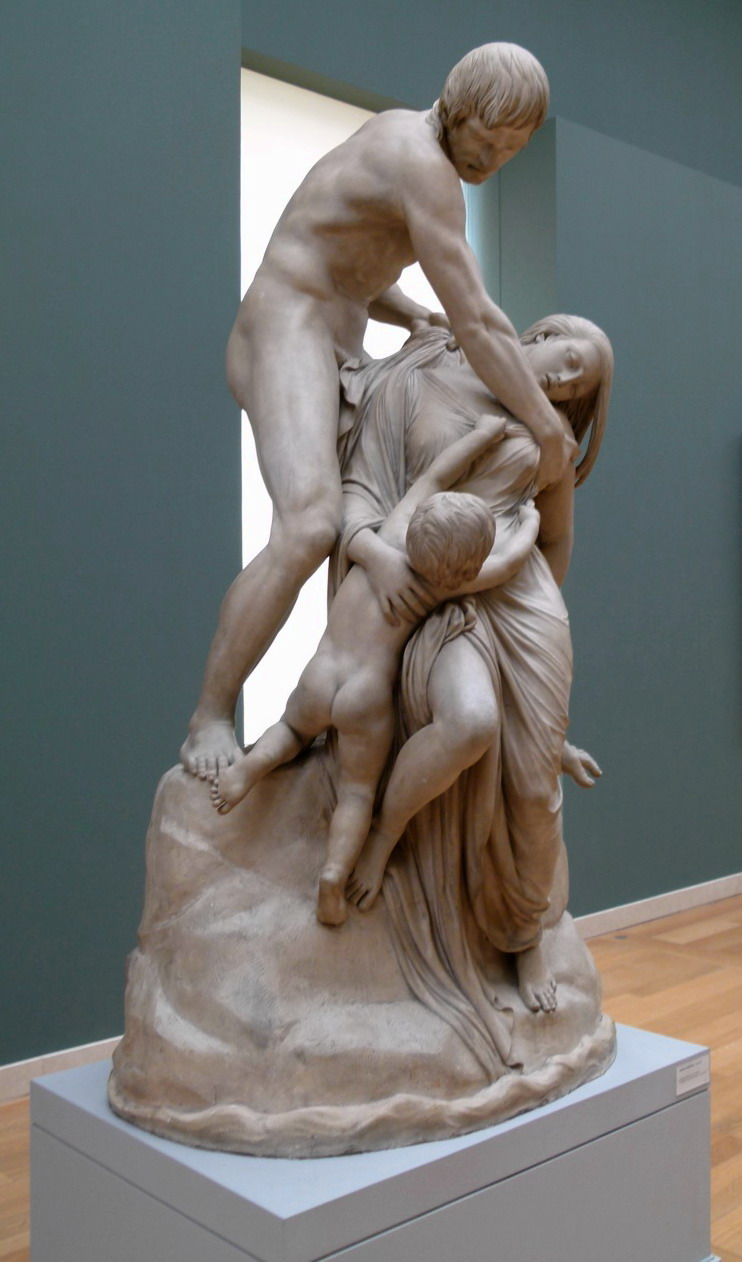
Deluge scene, Royal Museums of Fine Arts of Belgium, Brussels

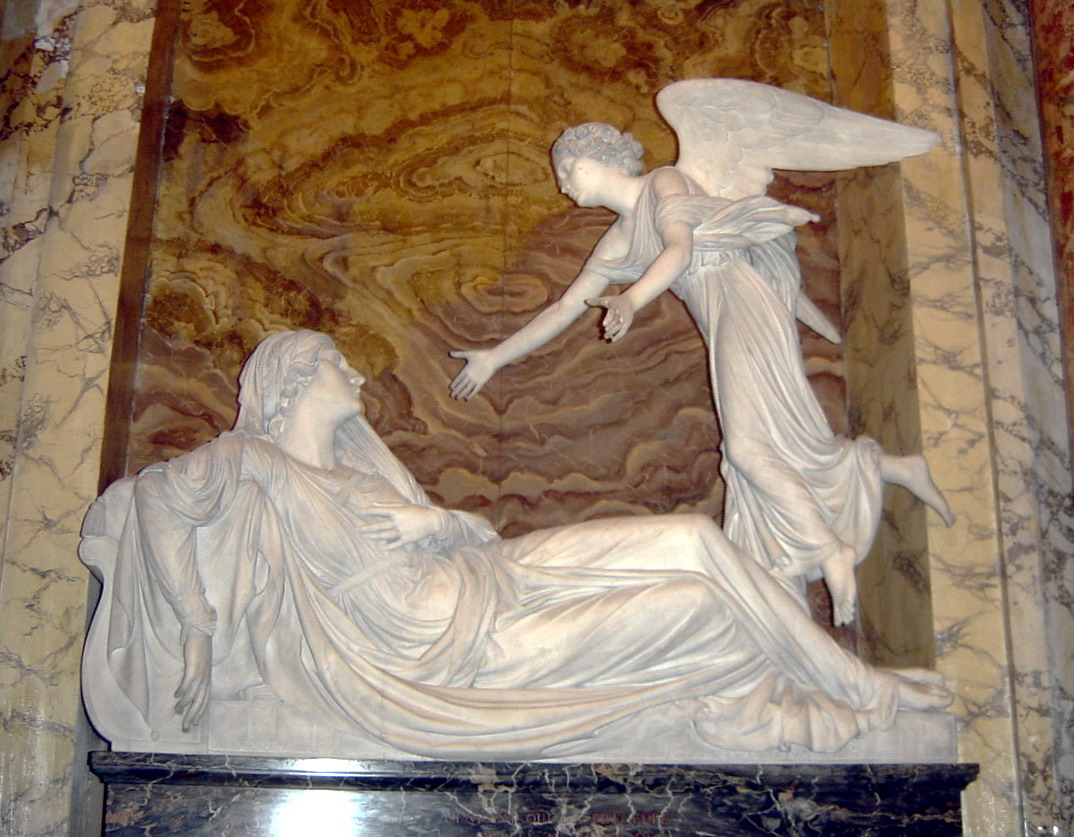
Tomb of the countess of Celles, Church of San Giuliano dei Fiamminghi, Rome

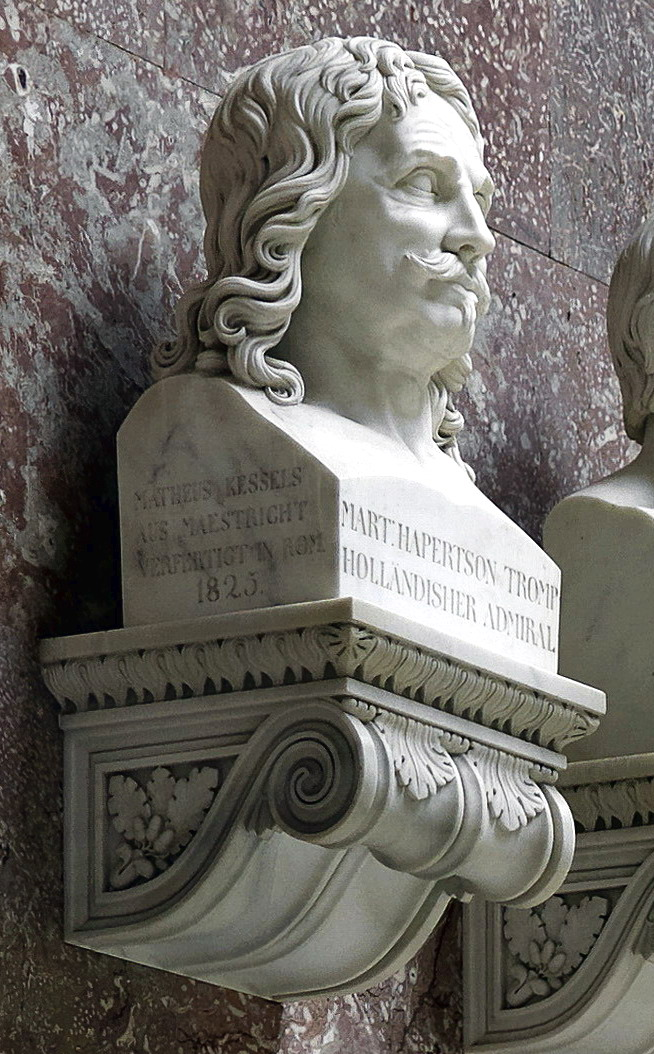
Portrait bust of Admiral Tromp, Walhalla memorial, Regensburg

== Sources ==
- Bergé, Willem, Heimwee naar de klassieken. De beelden van Mathieu Kessels en zijn tijdgenoten, 1815-1840. Zwolle, Den Bosch (1994)
- Herbermann, Charles, ed. (1913). "Matthias Kessels". Catholic Encyclopedia. New York: Robert Appleton Company.
- Ubachs, P.J.H. & Evers, I.M.H., Historische Encyclopedie Maastricht (2005)
