= K.F.C. Kessel =

Belgian football club

K. Kessel FC is a Belgian association football club team, which is based in Kessel. The club is playing in the lower Belgian football leagues. The club's teamcolours were yellow and blue up until 2007/2008. But after the name change to Kessel United, the colors changed to black and yellow to include the merged club of Excelsior Kessel.

KFC Kessel plays its games in the 'Herman Welters Stadion', which has a capacity of 100, wearing yellow shirts with a blue stripe.

The club is founded in 1926.

== Season 2007/2008 ==
The first team of KFC Kessel ended 14th in competition with 16 teams.
