= Maren, Netherlands =

Maren
- Village
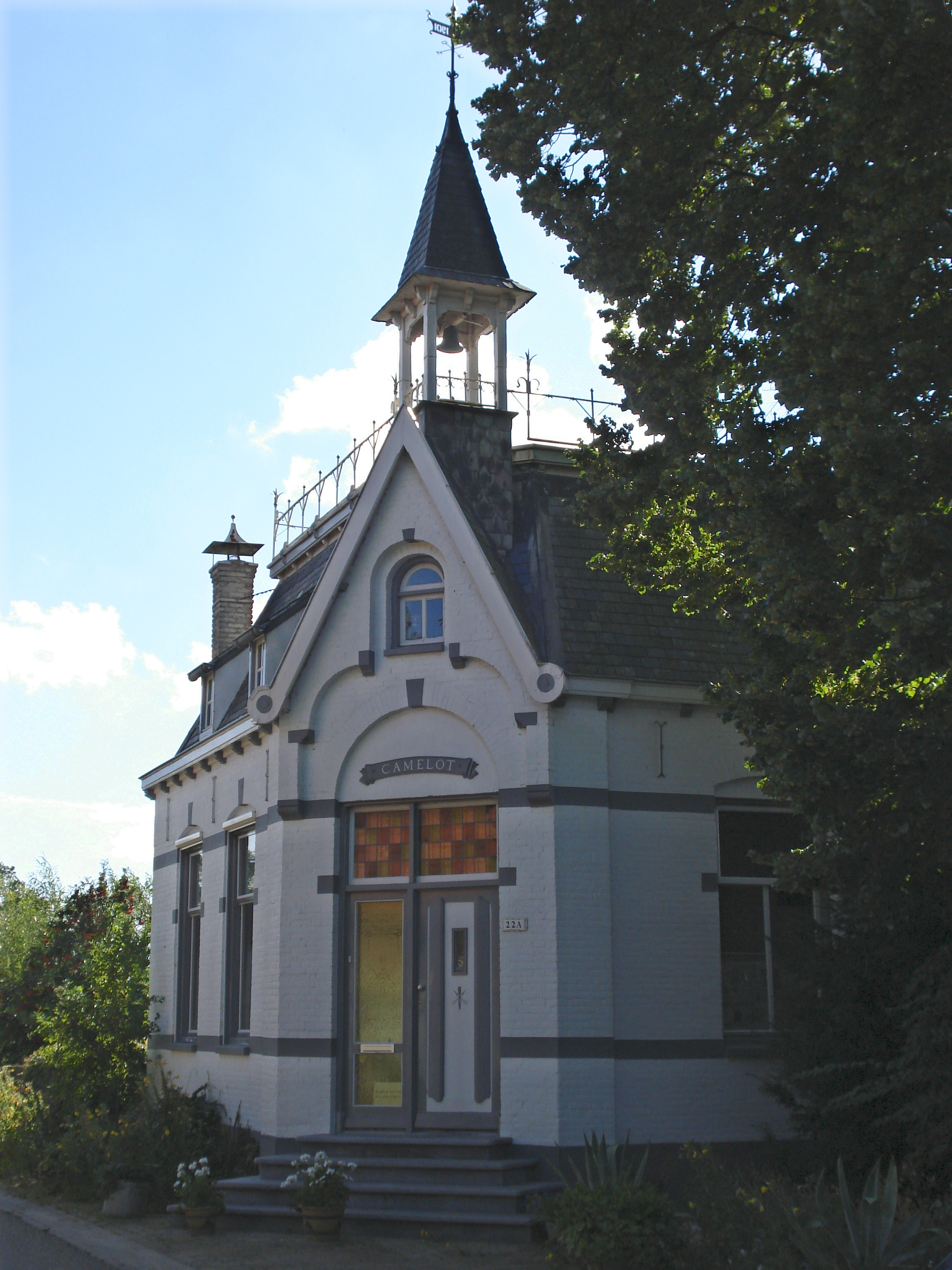
- Former town hall

- Coat of arms

- Location in the province of North Brabant in the Netherlands Maren (Netherlands)
- Coordinates: 51°47′30″N 5°22′47″E
- Country: Netherlands
- Province: North Brabant
- Municipality: Oss

Area
  - Total: 0.77 km^{2} (0.30 sq mi)
- Elevation: 6 m (20 ft)

Population (2021)
  - Total: 230
  - Density: 300/km^{2} (770/sq mi)
- Time zone: UTC+1 (CET)
  - Summer (DST): UTC+2 (CEST)
- Postal code: 5398
- Dialing code: 0412

Maren is a village in the Dutch province of North Brabant. It is located in the municipality of Oss, about 10 km northeast of 's-Hertogenbosch.

== History ==
The village was first mentioned in 997 as Marsna. The etymology is unclear. Maren developed on the river bank of the Maas.

The former town hall of Maren was built in 1901 and is an L-shaped building with Jugendstil influences.

Maren was a separate municipality until 1821, when it became part of Alem, Maren en Kessel. Maren was home to 298 people in 1840. The village and neighbouring Kessel were severely damaged by war in 1944, and lost its church. After the war a new village Maren-Kessel was built between the two villages. In 2011, it became part of the municipality of Oss.
