= Hendrik Johan Kessels =

Dutch-born clockmaker and naval chronometer maker

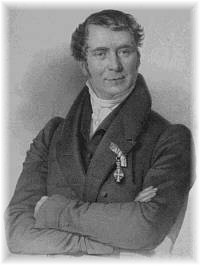
Hendrik Johan Kessels

Hendrik Johan Kessels (15 May 1781 – 15 July 1849) was a Dutch-born clockmaker and internationally renowned naval chronometer maker. He was particularly active in Altona, then part of Denmark but now in (Germany).

== Life ==
He was born in Maastricht, the third son of the cabinet maker Joachim Kessels and his wife Margaretha Caniëls. When he was ten years old his father died and the family moved to Margaretha's home town of Blerick. His eldest brother later became an architect in Hamburg, whilst his youngest brother was the sculptor Mathieu Kessels.

He designed tower clocks from a young age. In 1807 he joined the workshop of a chronometer maker in Altona, which was then a Danish town near Hamburg. He later also studied clockmaking in London and Copenhagen. From 1815 to 1821 he worked with the famous clockmaker Abraham Louis Breguet in Paris, where he worked on more than 140 clocks and watches, including the so-called 'Marie Antoinette pocket watch'. An impressive example of the collaboration between Kessels and Breguet is a complicated table-model chronometer from around 1820, which is signed by Breguet but also inscribed "La partie chronométrique par Kessels 1312".

In 1821, with the help of Frederik VI of Denmark, he founded a company in Altona to produce precision watches – this company later became Theodor Knoblich and existed until 1991. Kessels worked on the development of marine chronometers, observation clocks and pendulums for astronomical observatories. He also continued to represent Breguet in northern Germany and Scandinavia and seems to have worked with the British chronometer maker George Muston. In total, 200 to 250 precision watches can be attributed to Kessels, an average of eight per year. He probably also worked for his Hamburg-based brother Willem Hendrik, the architect of the first Hamburg observatory – Hendrik Johan lived near to it and took a great interest in it.

In 1827 Kessels was made a Knight of the Order of the Dannebrog. From 1830 he was a Danish citizen. In 1831 he was admitted to the Swedish Royal Academy of Sciences as a foreign member. He died of cholera in Claverham, near Bristol, England, in 1849, leaving the 8-day Naval Chronometer No. 1287 unfinished – it was completed by Edward John Dent for Kessels' widow.

== Sources ==
- (in German) Oestmann, Günther, Heinrich Johann Kessels: Ein bedeutender Verfertiger von Chronometern und Präzisionspendeluhren. Biographische Skizze und Werkverzeichnis (= Acta Historicae Astronomomiae, 44), Frankfurt/M. 2011 (ISBN 3817118848 / ISBN 9783817118847)
- (in German) 'Kessels, Heinrich Johann' on watch-wiki.org
