= Lith, Netherlands =

Lith
- Village
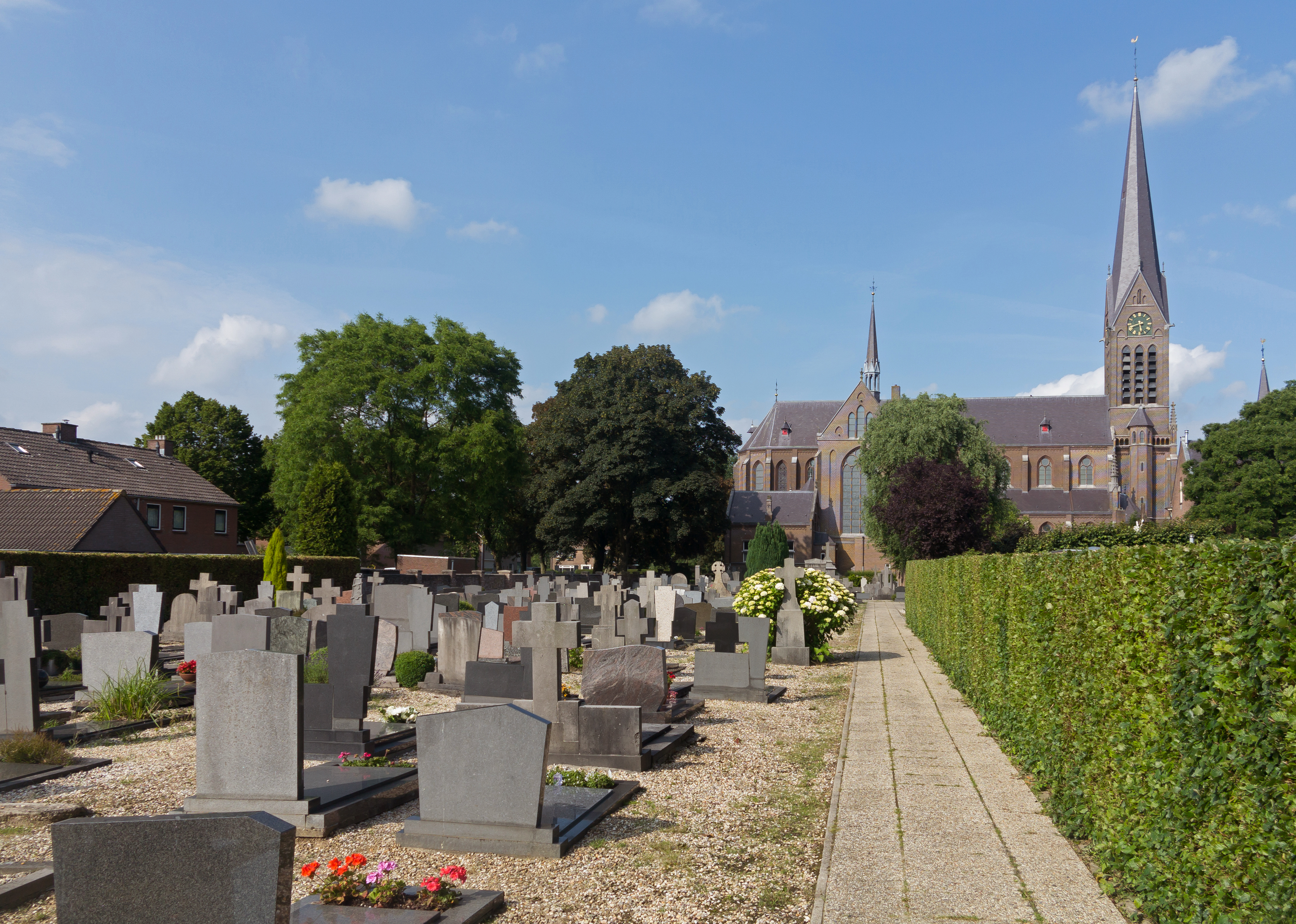
- St Lambertus Church

- Flag Coat of arms

- Location in the province of North Brabant in the Netherlands Lith (Netherlands)
- Coordinates: 51.8051°N 5.4398°E
- Country: Netherlands
- Province: North Brabant
- Municipality: Oss

Area
  - Total: 13.04 km^{2} (5.03 sq mi)
- Elevation: 4.9 m (16 ft)

Population (2021)
  - Total: 3,130
  - Density: 240/km^{2} (622/sq mi)
- Time zone: UTC+1 (CET)
  - Summer (DST): UTC+2 (CEST)
- Postal code: 5397
- Dialing code: 0412

Lith is a village in the province North Brabant in the Netherlands. Before 2011, there was also a municipality; since 2011 Lith is a part of Oss.

== History ==
Lith was first mentioned in 1202 as Litte. The etymology is unknown. Lith developed on a fordable location on the Maas. A harbour has been known to exist at Lith since 968. Originally it was part of the Duchy of Brabant. Later it became part of the Prince-Bishopric of Liège. In 1672, it was conquered by the Dutch Republic.

The Dutch Reformed church dated from the Middle Ages, but was destroyed by a V-1 flying bomb in 1945. The church was rebuilt in 1953. The Catholic St Lambertus Church was built 1899 and 1900 and has a slender needle spire. The grist mill Zeldenrust was built around 1800. It remained in service until 1972, and bought by the municipality in 1973. The wind mill is occasionally in use.

Lith was home to 1,279 people in 1840. Lith was an independent municipality until 1958 when it was merged into Alem, Maren en Kessel. In 2011, it became part of the municipality of Oss.

== Gallery ==
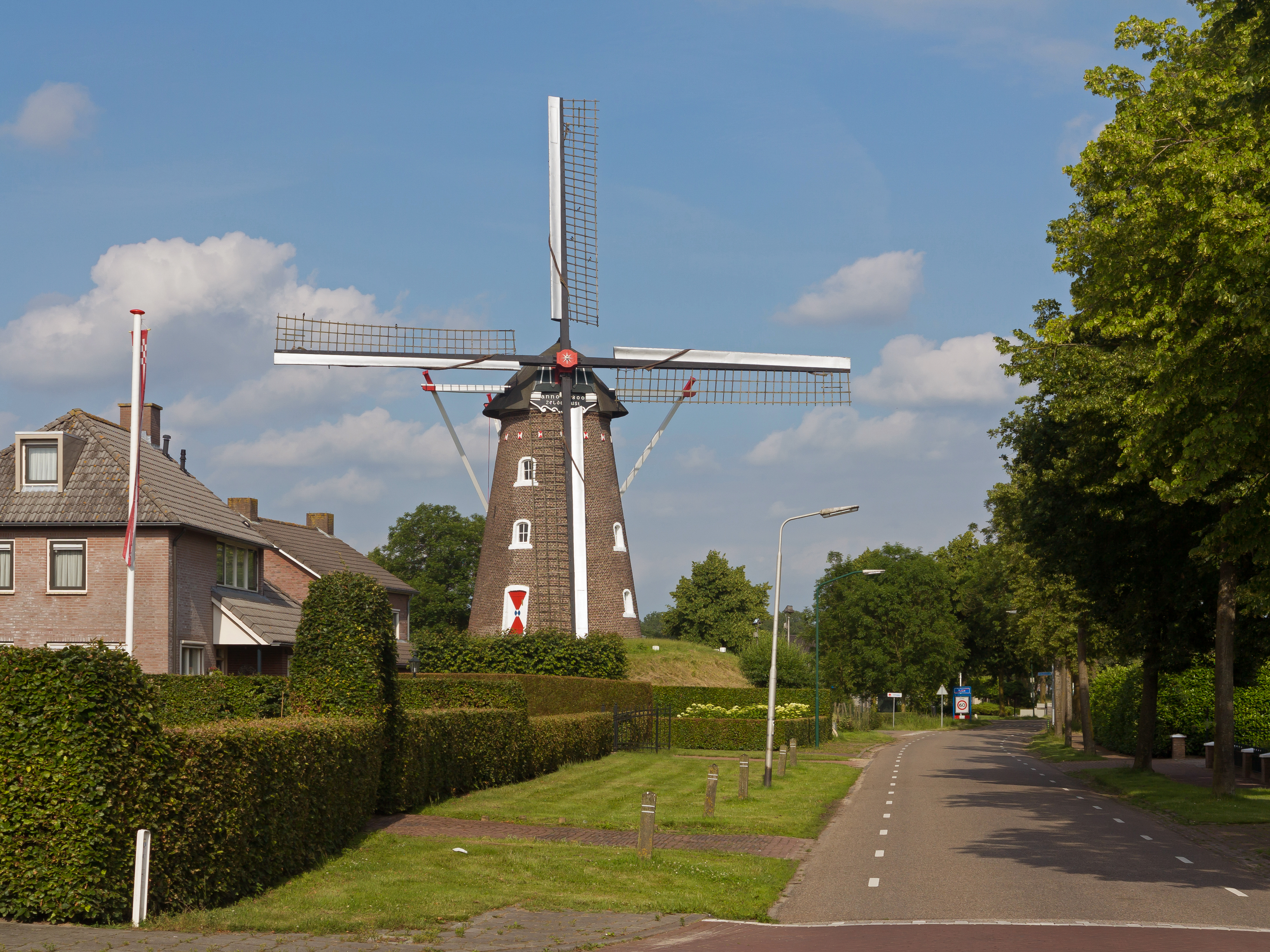
Windmill molen de Zeldenrust

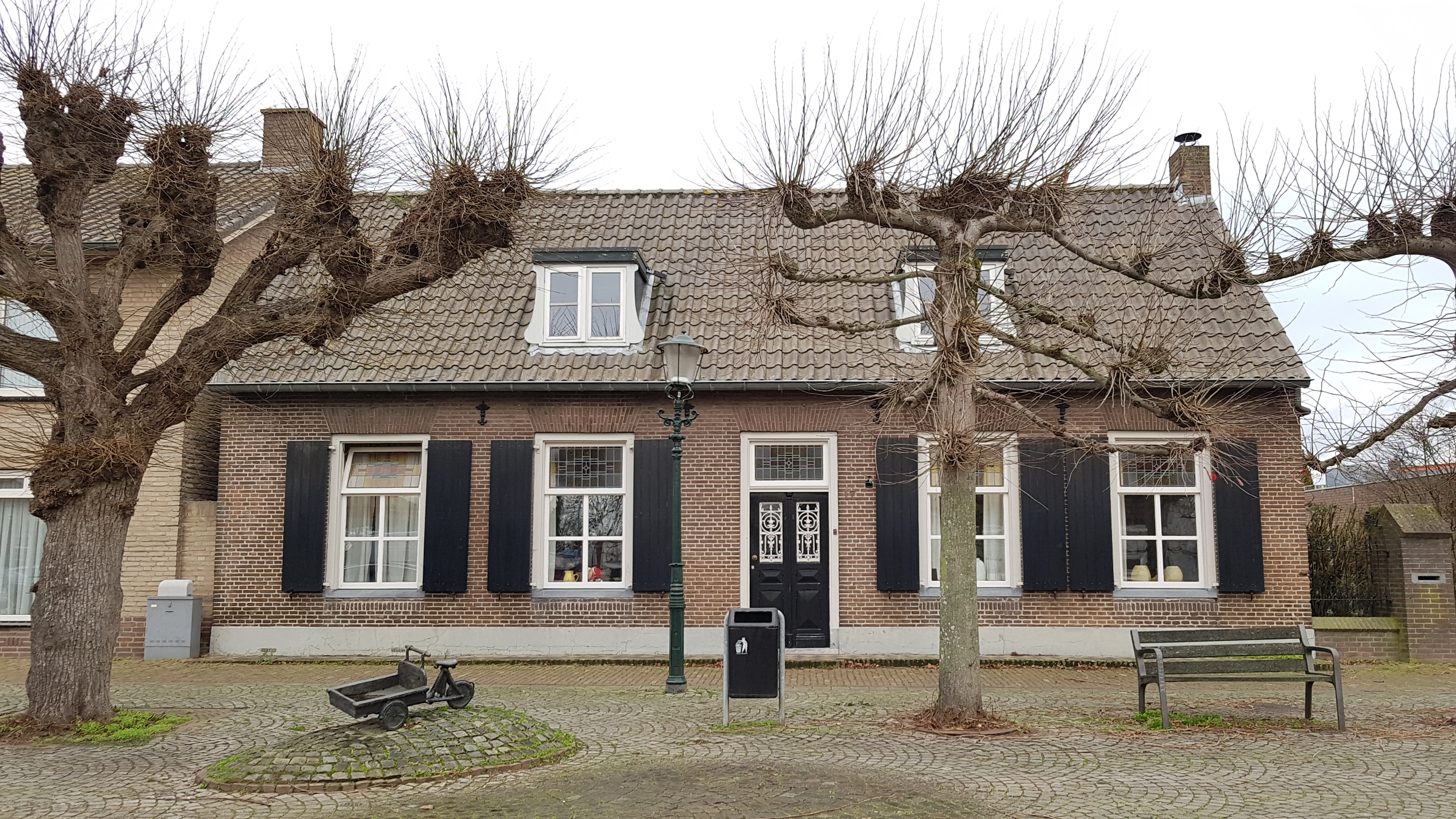
House in Lith

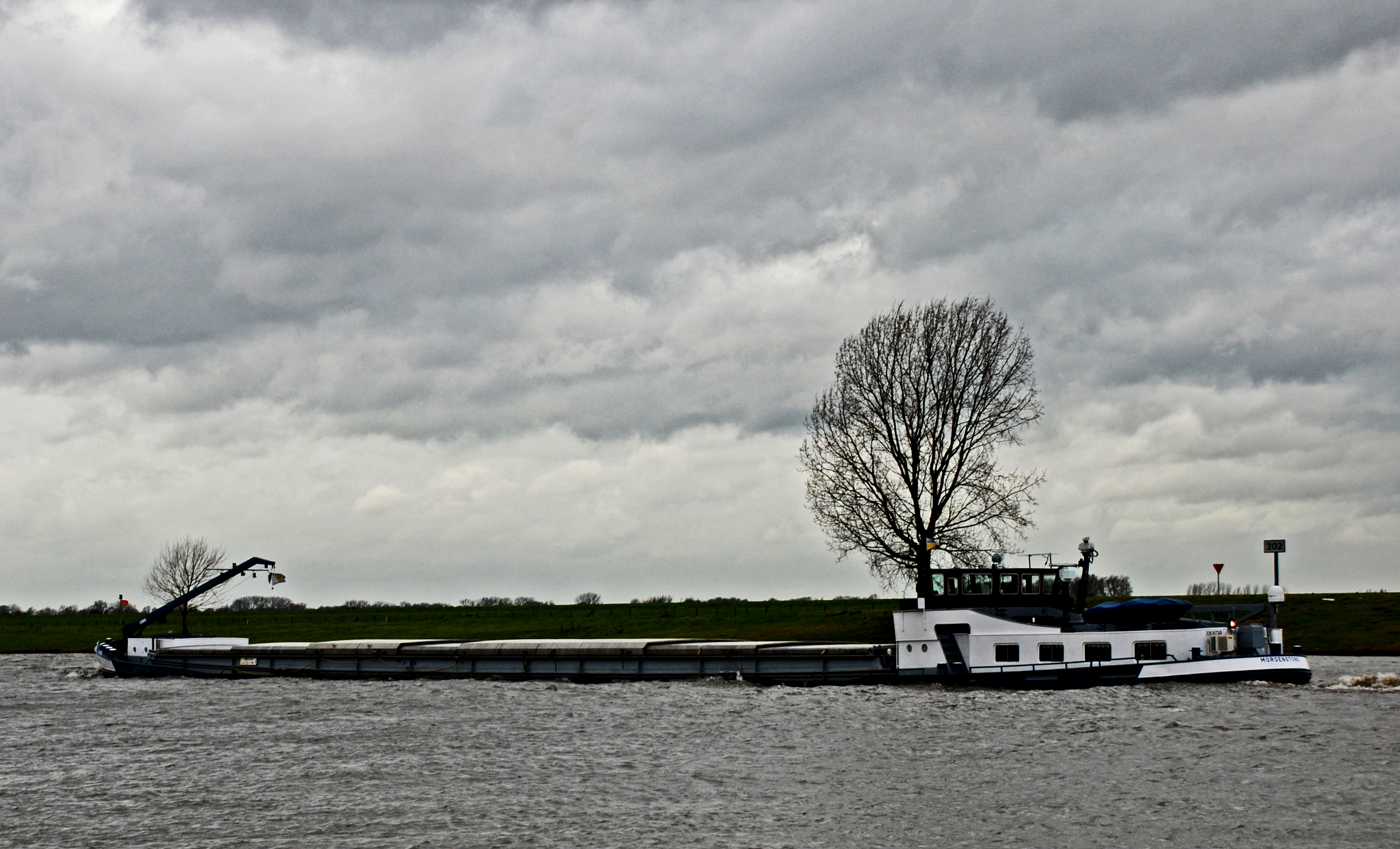
Barge on the Maas

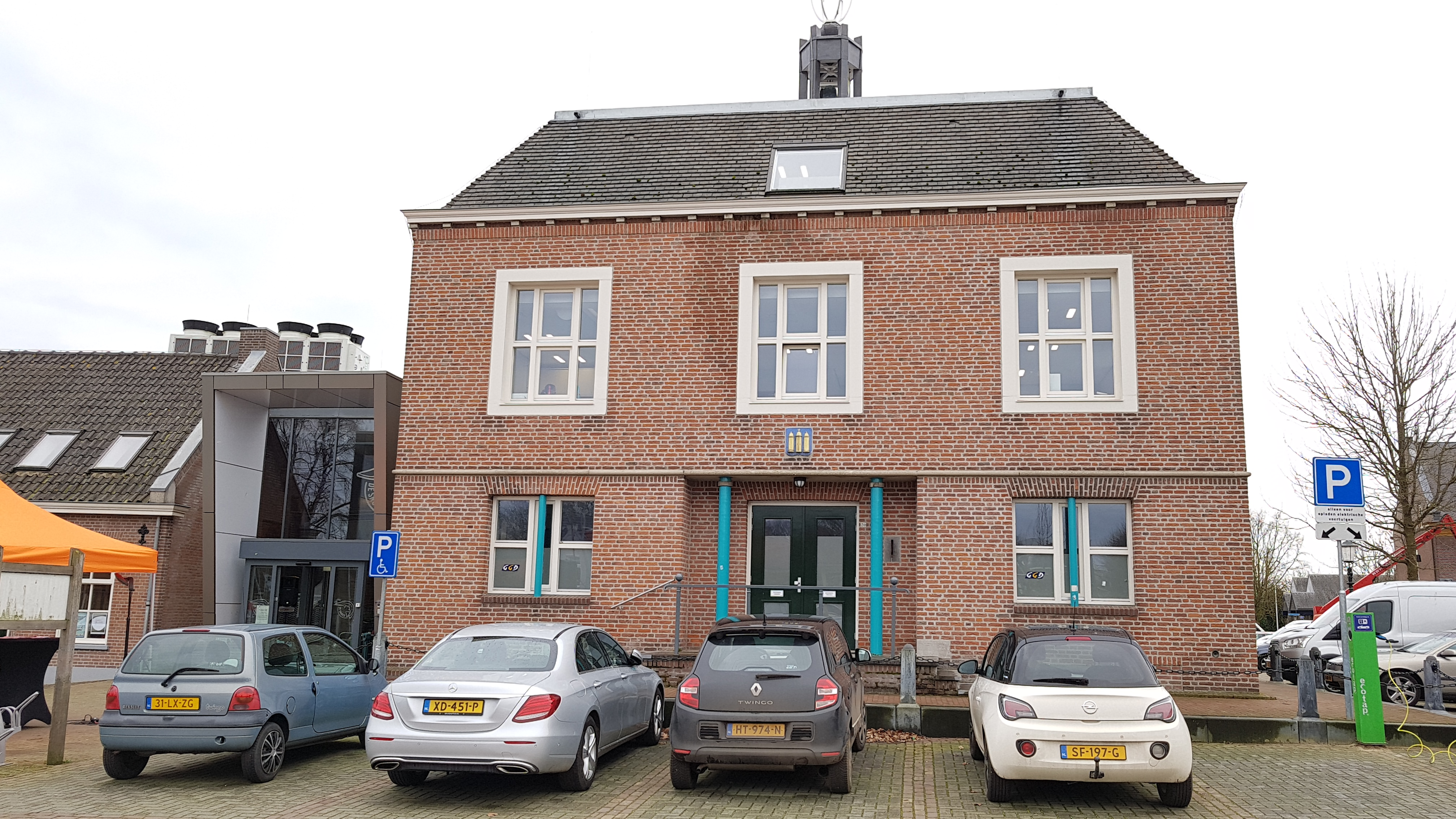
Former town hall
