= Alem =

- Village
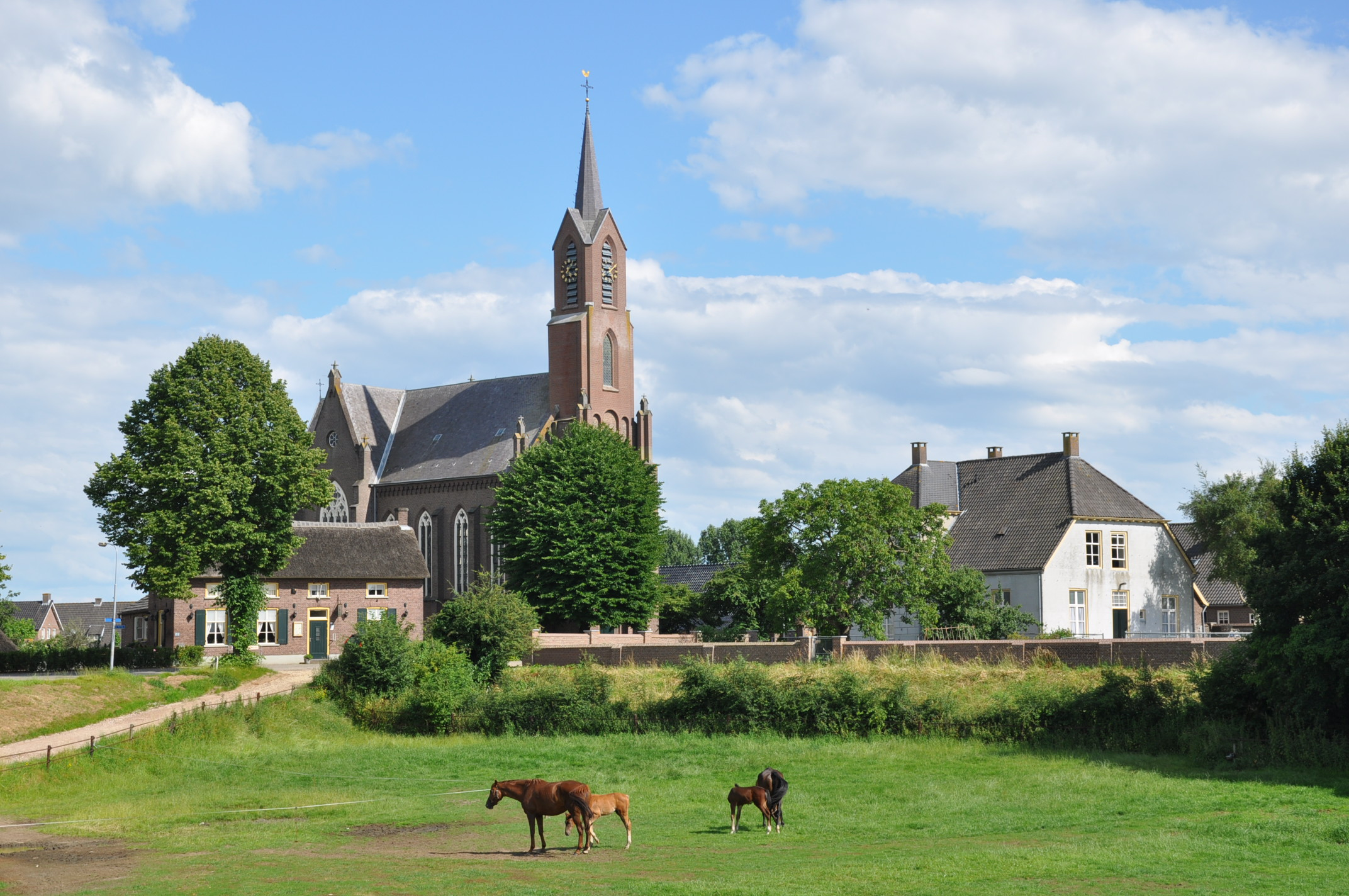
- View of Alem

- Coat of arms

- Location in the Netherlands Alem (Netherlands)
- Coordinates: 51°47′13″N 5°20′37″E
- Country: Netherlands
- Province: Gelderland
- Municipality: Maasdriel

Area
  - Total: 5.93 km^{2} (2.29 sq mi)
- Elevation: 2 m (6.6 ft)

Population (2021)
  - Total: 645
  - Density: 109/km^{2} (282/sq mi)
- Time zone: UTC+1 (CET)
  - Summer (DST): UTC+2 (CEST)
- Postal code: 5335
- Dialing code: 0418

Alem is a village in the Dutch province of Gelderland. It is a part of the municipality of Maasdriel, and lies about 10 km north of 's-Hertogenbosch.

It used to part of the province in North Brabant. In 1934, it became part of Gelderland. Until 1958, Alem, Maren en Kessel was a separate municipality. The villages of Maren and Maren-Kessel are now part of the municipality of Lith.

== History ==
It was first mentioned in 1107 as Aleym. The etymology is unclear. The village developed along the Maas. The Dutch Reformed Church has probably been built around 1719 using material from a previous church lost in a 1717 flood. In 1840, it was home to 307 people.

In 1925, the canalisation of the Maas resulted in Alem becoming a river island. In 1934, it became part of the province of Gelderland.

== Gallery ==
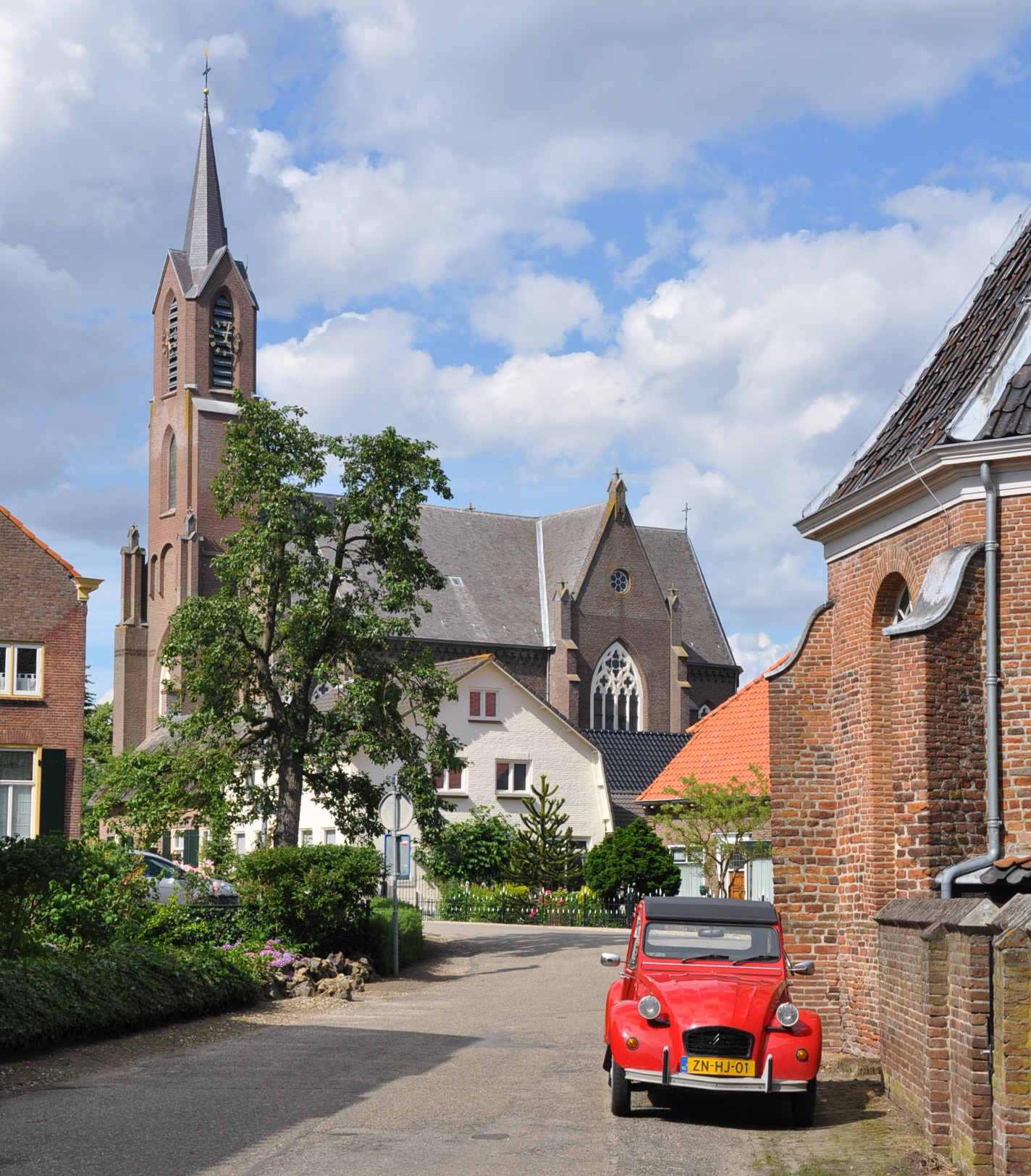
Scene in Alem

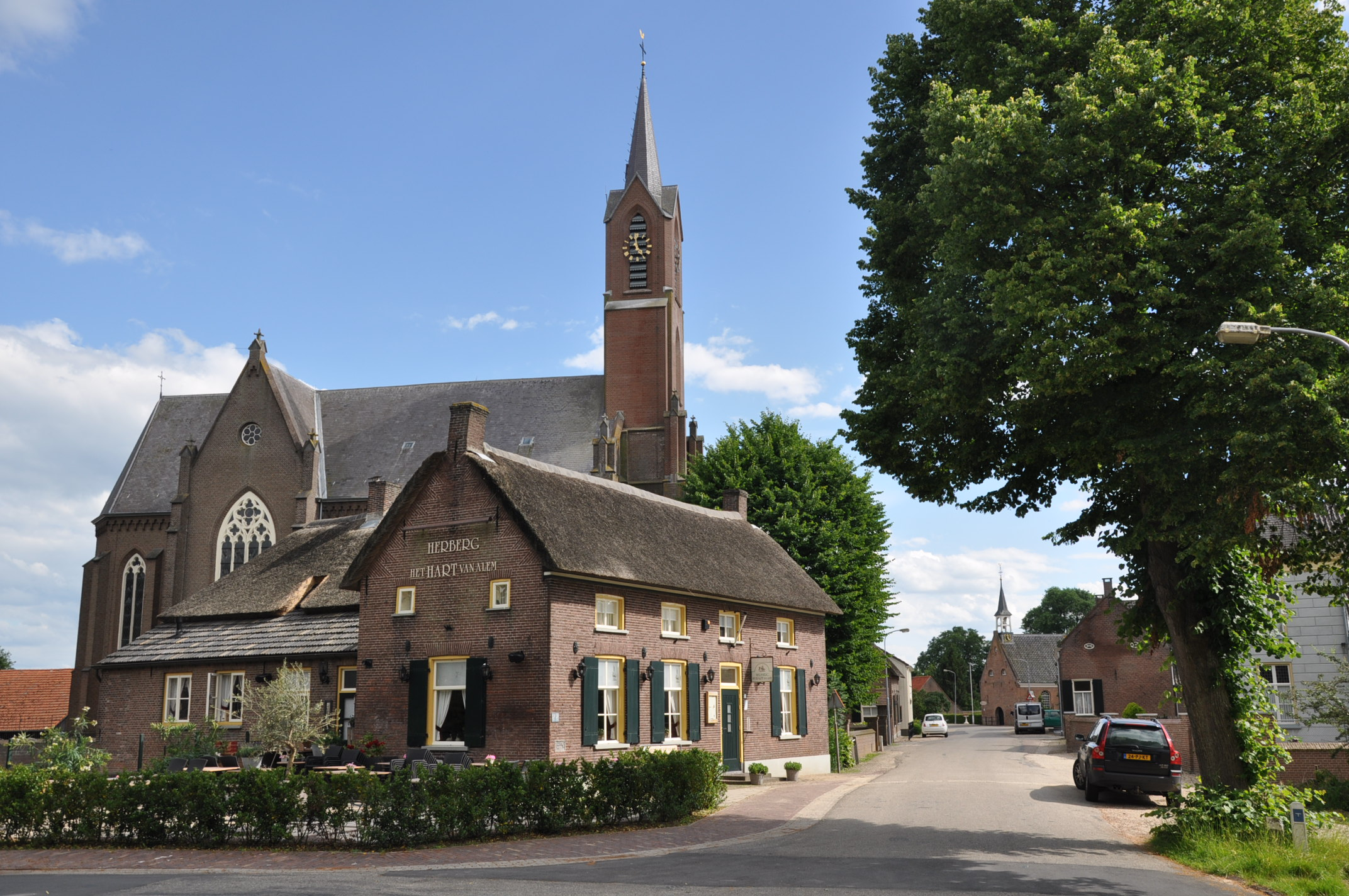
Saint Odradastreet with village inn "Het Hart van Alem"

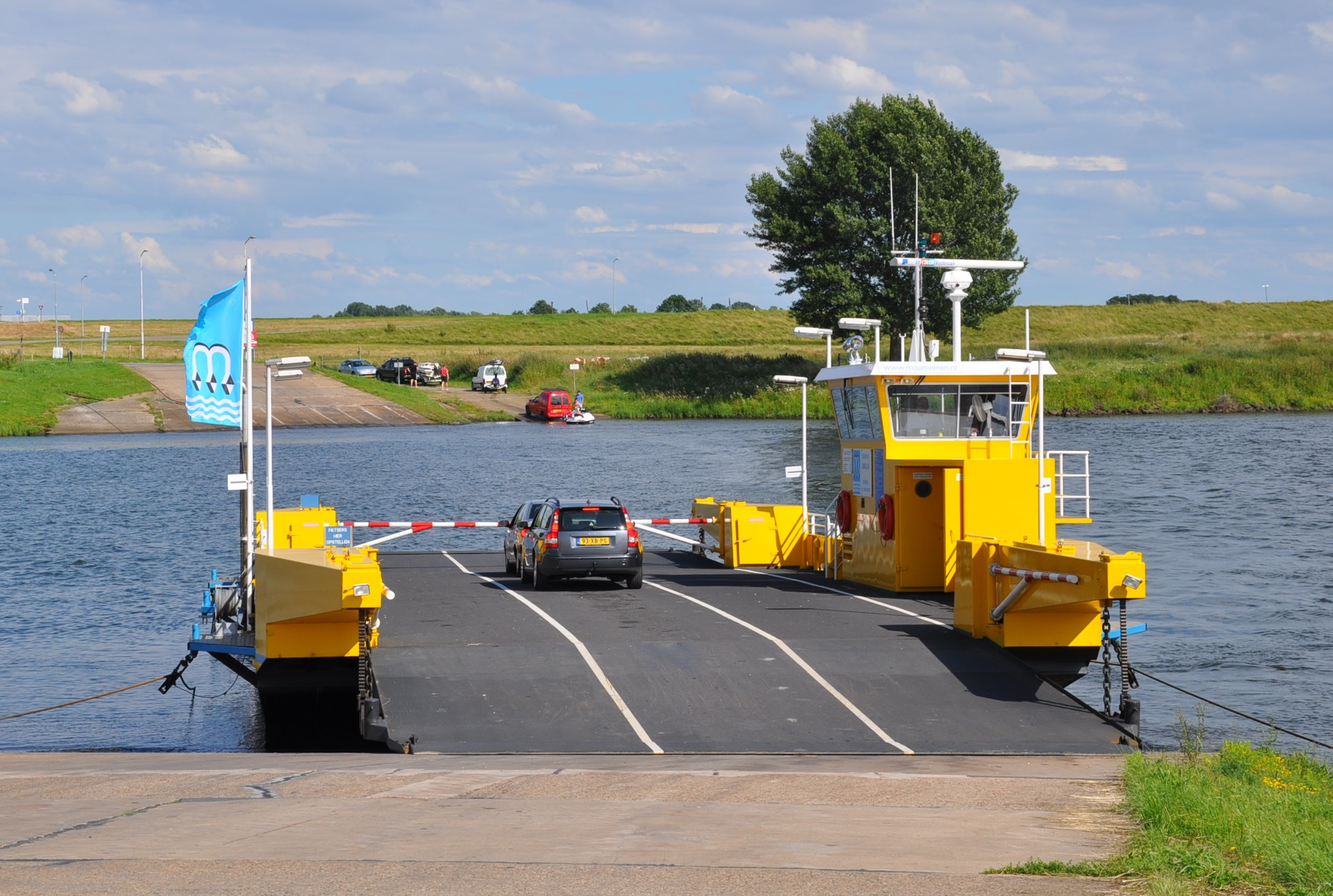
Ferry across the river Meuse
