= Marine energy management =

Practices and systems for reducing energy use and emissions in ship operations

Marine energy management is the application of systematic methods to measure, register and analyze the energy usage of oceangoing vessels in specific.

The goal of marine energy management is to

- maximize the (electrical or mechanical) energy generated from the minimum amount of fossil fuel, and
- maximize the useful work obtained from the minimum amount of generated energy. The IMO is the international body responsible for code regulation.

These are two separated optimization problems.

Marine energy management can both be applied on board and onshore. It is a complex problem, due to the number of inter-related energy systems on board vessels, such as the propulsion, the auxiliary engines, refrigeration systems, HVAC, etc. The weather and sea-state, plus the logistics involved in transporting goods from one port to another, also have big effects.

Marine energy management can be addressed on board through measuring devices, monitoring systems and decision-support systems. It can be addressed onshore through data analysis, leading to change in operation on board.

== See also ==
- Fuel efficiency
- Energy Engineering
- Marine fuel management
