= Joost Vander Auwera =

Belgian art historian and museum curator (born 1957)

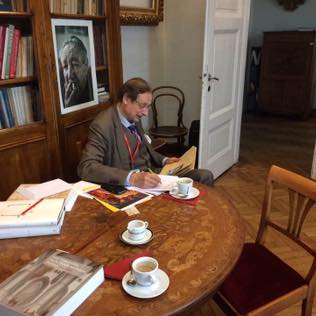
Dr. Joost Vander Auwera

Dr. Joost Vander Auwera (born 24 January 1957) is a Belgian art historian and former museum curator. He is a specialist in Seventeenth-Century Flemish painting and a leading expert on the paintings of Jacob Jordaens, Abraham Janssens, and Sebastian Vrancx.

Vander Auwera was born in Bruges and graduated from Ghent University, where he received his M.A. and Ph.D. after research and dissertations on the Flemish Baroque painters Sebastian Vrancx and Abraham Janssens. He also received an M.B.A. from the Vlerick Business School.

He is Honorary Senior Curator at the Royal Museums of Fine Arts of Belgium in Brussels. He is the Co-Founder and Project Leader of the international multidisciplinary Jordaens Van Dyck Panel Paintings Project and was the Project Leader for the establishment of the visitors centre at the Brueghel House, Brussels.

Vander Auwera has authored some 75 publications on 17th-Century Flemish painting and museum administration. With Dr. Sabine van Sprang, he curated the exhibition Rubens. A Genius at Work, 2007-8 at the Brussels Museum. In 2012-13, he co-curated the first exhibition on Jacob Jordaens held in Brussels since 1928 and the first in Germany (it showed in both Brussels and the Museumslandschaft Hessen Kassel), Jordaens and the Antique. He was a contributing author to the Jordaens 1593-1678 exhibition catalogue, Petit Palais, Paris, in 2013.

He is Vice President of the UNESCO International Committee on the History of Art.
