= Anna Maria Janssens =

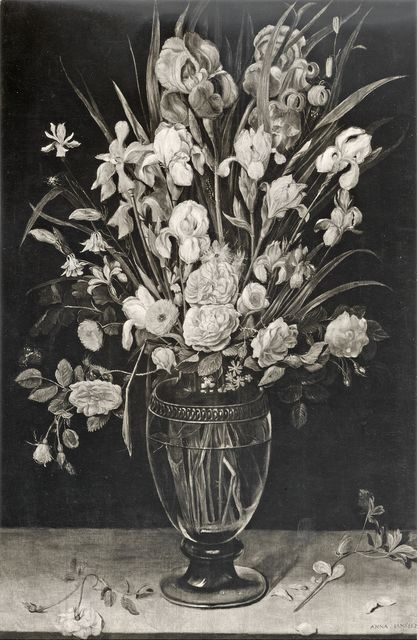
- Still life of flowers in a glass vase, 100 x 67 cm, signed
- Born: c. 1609
- Died: 1668 (aged 62–63)
- Occupation: Painter
- Spouse: Jan Brueghel the Younger (m. 1626)
- Children: 11, including Abraham, Philips, and Jan Pieter
- Father: Abraham Janssens

Anna Maria Janssens (circa 1609 – 1668) may have been a Flemish painter.

She was the daughter of the famous Flemish painter Abraham Janssens and on 5 July 1626 married the painter Jan Brueghel the Younger with whom she had eleven children. Her mother was Sara Goetkint, the daughter of Peter Goetkint the Elder, also a painter and the second teacher of Jan Brueghel the Elder, the father of her husband. Her exact date of birth is unknown but in a legal document of 1651, she is mentioned as having been 42 years old at the time, which would put her birth in c. 1609, rather than c. 1605, as suggested earlier. That would mean that she married young, around 17 years old.

She is generally identified as the painter of a signed but undated painting, Still life of Flowers in a Glass Vase, which was published by Ralph Warner in 1928. As Marie-Louise Hairs noted in 1985, and more recently Fred G. Meijer in 2013, these flowers are reminiscent of the work of another Flemish still-life painter, Alexander Adriaenssen.

No contemporary document refers to the daughter of Abraham Janssens/wife of Jan Brueghel the Younger as ‘painter’ and she was not registered as member of the Antwerp guild of Saint Luke. We hear of her in 1644, when she is one of the beneficiaries in the will of her mother at her death. Sara Goetkint leaves her living children a number of paintings by her late husband. Furthermore, Anna Janssens is mentioned in 1651, when she is asked to testify in a legal suit at the request of her sister-in-law Catharina Goetkint-Brueghel. In the papers of the Antwerp guild she is only referred to after her death in connection with the payment of death dues by her widower in (1667-)1668: “Ontfanck van de doodtschulden (Anna-Maria Janssens,) de huysvrouwe van mendeken. Breugel (Jan Brueghel II, schilder). 3. 4.” She was still alive but seriously ill on 11 March 1668, as is testified by another archival document.

It is unclear whether she still worked as a painter after her marriage and the birth of her first children. Apart from the fact that she is not documented as a painter, in the early modern period, most female artists in Flanders with a serious career remained childless and the majority even remained unmarried, for instance Michaelina Wautier, Catharina Ykens, and the three daughters of Jan Philip van Thielen, Anna Maria, Francisca Catharina and Maria Theresia van Thielen. Biographical details on the most famous Flemish woman artist of the 17th century, Clara Peeters, are inconclusive. On the contrary, Rachel Ruysch continued to paint and produce commissions throughout het marriage and adult life. She had 10 children, comparable to Anna Maria Janssens who had 11 children.

Recently, two more paintings in the art trade were associated with Anna Janssens. The first, Garland of flowers around a medaillon with the Holy Family and a music making angel, sold at auction with Dorotheum, Vienna in 2020, is oddly inscribed below the central image: ANNA JANS. Also, the style of the flowers does not correspond with the way the fully signed bouquet is rendered, as also observed by Dr. Fred G. Meijer. Moreover, the painting appears to follow a composition from the studio of Frans Francken the Younger of which an example is in the Musée de Louvre, Paris. The same can be said of a second work, Extensive bouquet of mixed spring and summer flowers in a wooden tub beside a squirrel, sold at auction with Bonham's London in 2020. At the time, the painting was offered with an attribution to someone in the Workshop of Jan Brueghel the Younger, at the authority of Dr. Fred G. Meijer, but it later resurfaced with art dealer Florence de Voldère in Paris under the name of Anna Janssens, with no clear explanation for this change of attribution.

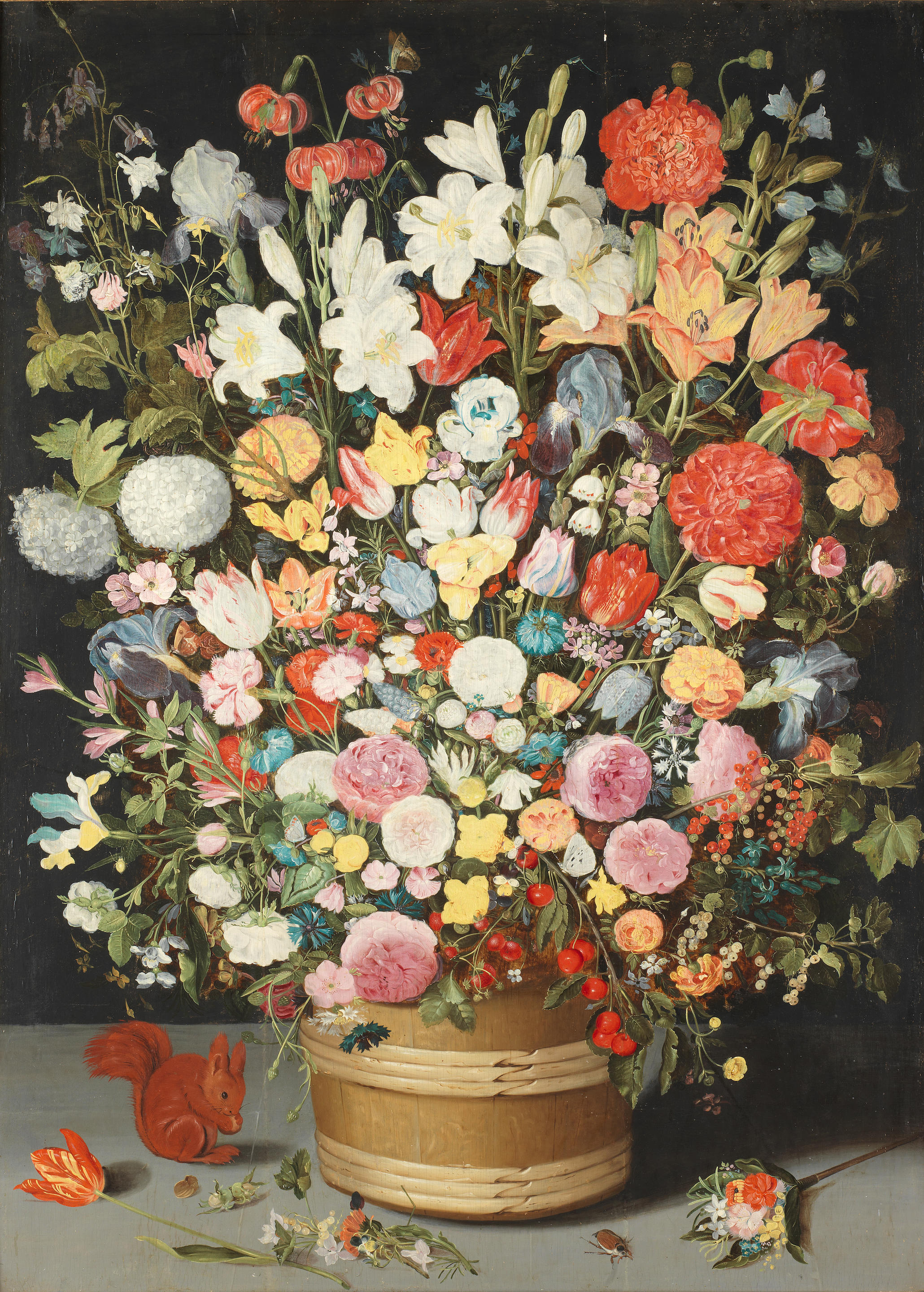
Studio of Jan Brueghel the Younger or Anna Maria Janssens(?),Extensive bouquet of mixed spring and summer flowers in a wooden tub beside a squirrel

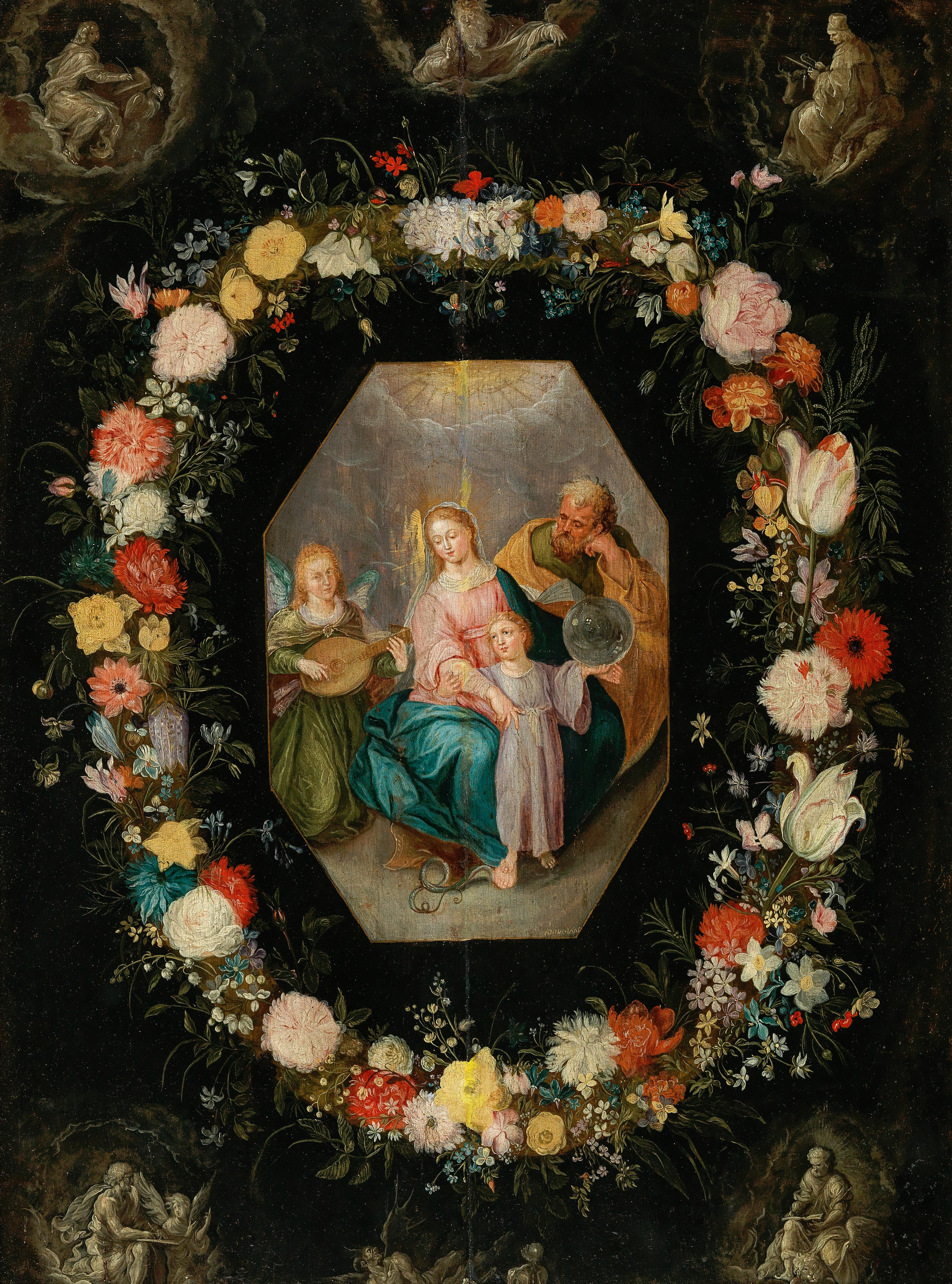
Frans Francken the Younger, Studio of Jan Brueghel the Younger and Anna Maria Janssens(?),Garland of flowers around a medaillon with the Holy Family and a music making angel

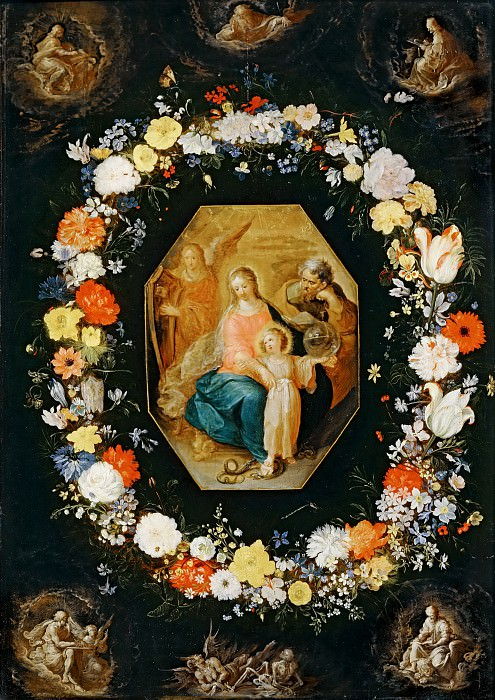
Frans Francken the Younger and Studio of Jan Brueghel the Younger, The Holy Family in a garland of flowers
