= Jan Snellinck (III) =

Dutch painter

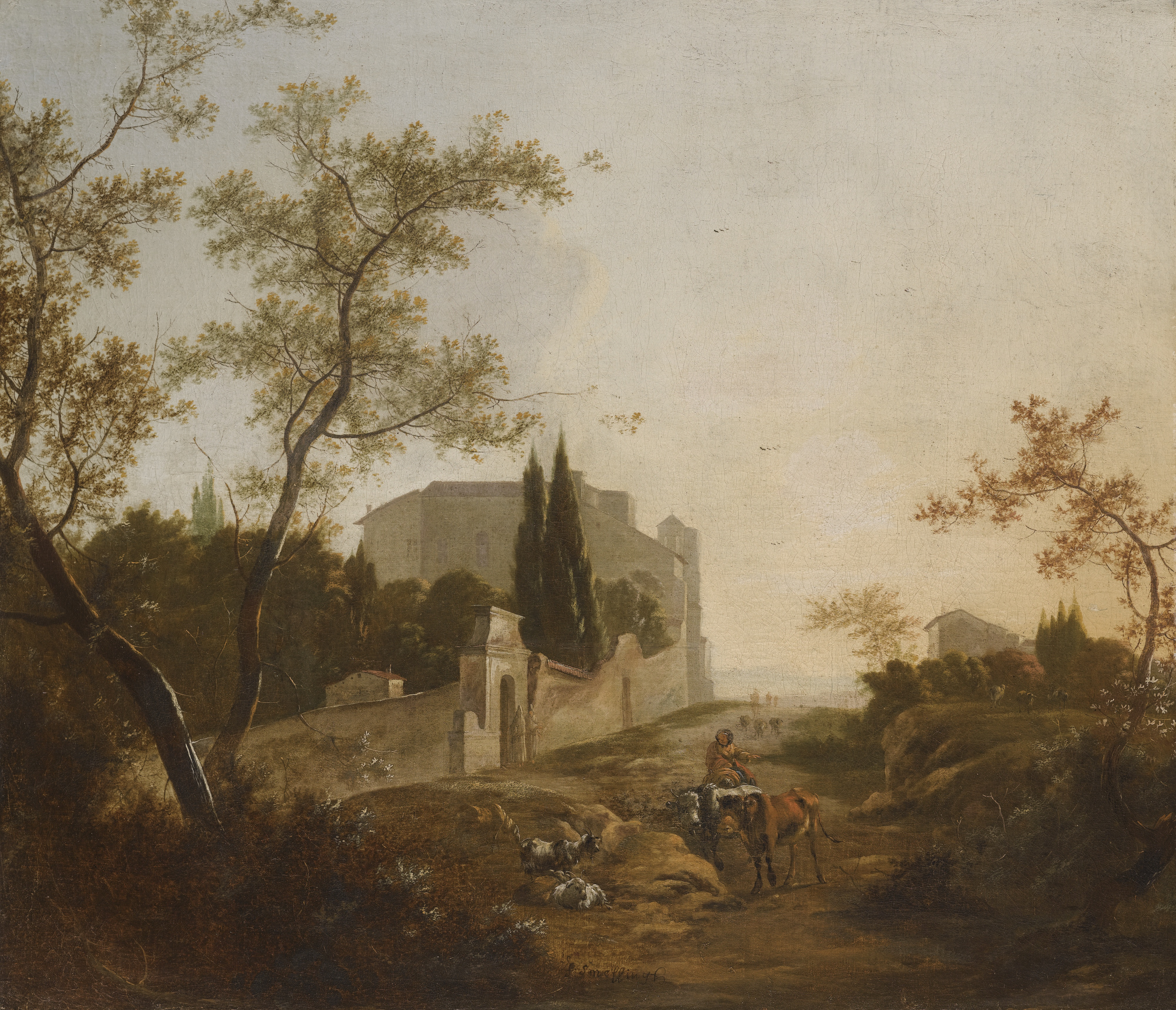
Landscape with a rider near a villa

Jan Snellinck (III) ( Rotterdam, 1640 – Rotterdam, before 1691) was a Dutch landscape painter. He worked his entire career in Rotterdam and is known for his landscapes, moonlight scenes and peasant scenes.

== Life ==
Jan Snellinck (III) was born in Rotterdam and was baptized on 9 April 1640. He was the son of Cornelis Snellinck and Maertje Jans. His father was a landscape painter of Flemish descent who had been born in Antwerp or Rotterdam. His Flemish family included a number of prominent artists. His grandfather Jan Snellinck the Younger was a genre and history painter. His great-grandfather was the prominent Flemish painter and art dealer Jan Snellinck the Elder, who was originally from Mechelen and worked most of his career in Antwerp. Jan Snellinck (III)'s grand-uncles Daniel and Gerard were also painters.

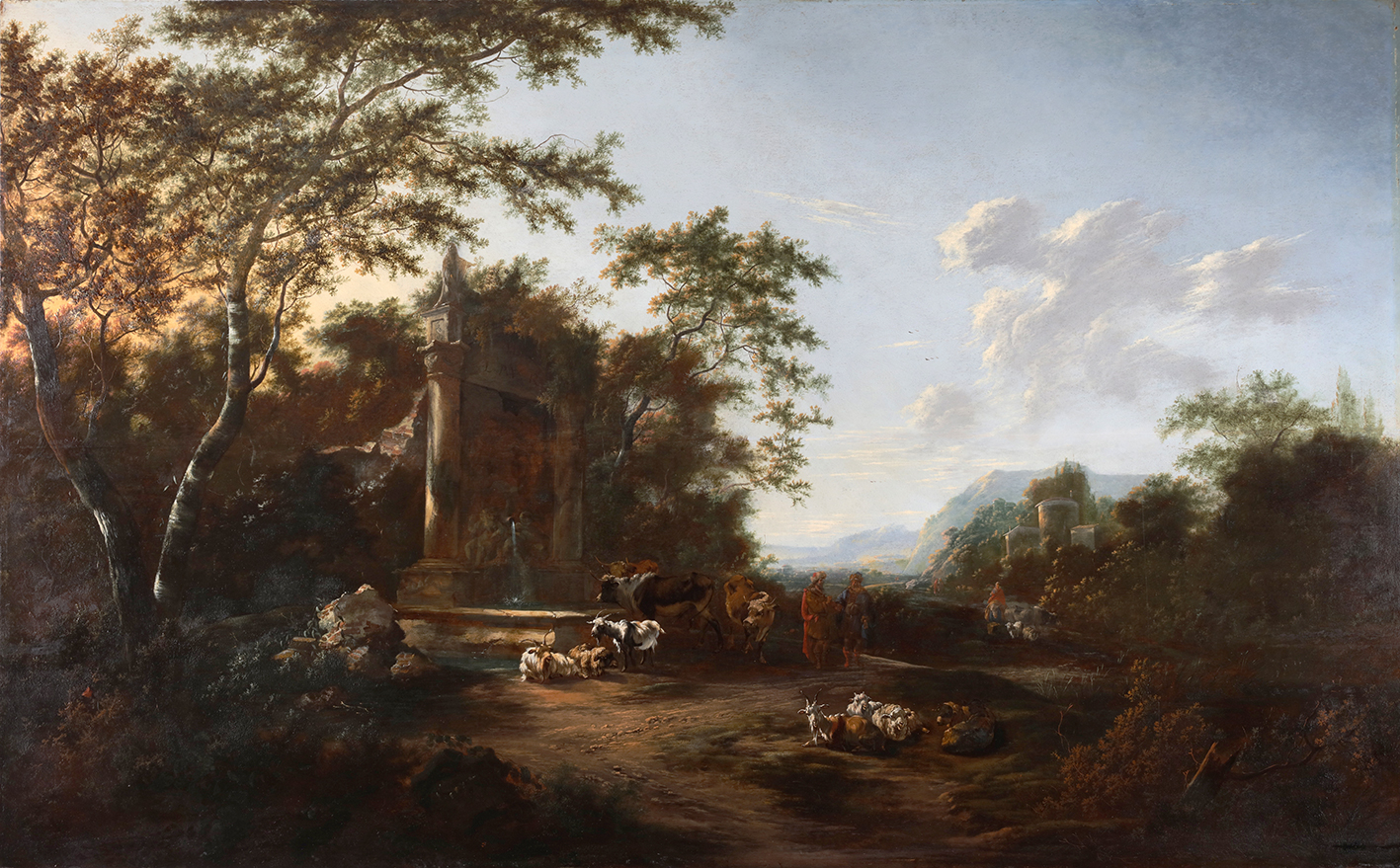
Cattle resting near a farm with Adam Colonia

Very little is known about the life of Jan Snellinck (III). He likely trained with his father. He was active in Rotterdam for his entire career.

The death date and place of Jan Snellinck are not known but it is believed that he died before 1691 in Rotterdam.

== Work ==
Jan Snellinck (III) painted landscapes, moonlight scenes and peasant scenes. Many of his scenes are Italianate landscapes rather than Dutch landscapes. Characteristic for his work are the tree branches that stand out against the sky as fine webs with stylized, delicate and tender leaves. His palette moves from cool blue and gray-greens to the warm rust brown of the underpainting. The foreground motifs are formed by finely divided and precisely painted shapes while the view is summarily executed.

There is a lot of similarity between his work and that of his father Cornelis. A work in the National Gallery in Prague originally attributed to Cornelis is now attributed to Jan (III). Father Cornelis paid more attention to detail in his landscapes than his son.

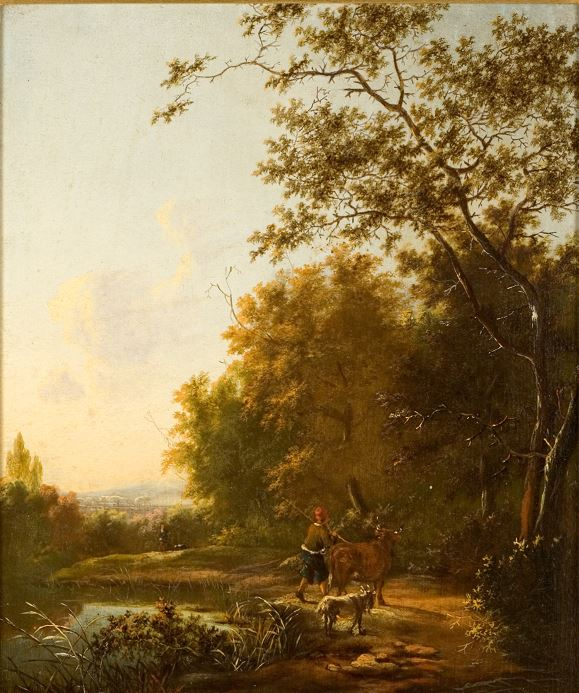
Country road through a forest with cattle and shepherds

Jan Snellinck (III) collaborated on a number of landscapes with Adam Colonia who provided the staffage in his landscapes.
