= Edith Greindl =

Belgian art historian

- Born: June 25, 1905; Sint-Gillis, Belgium
- Died: June 7, 2004

Edith Greindl (1905 – 2004) was a leading Belgian art historian specializing in Flemish paintings of the 17th century.

Her overview of the “golden age of Flemish painting” was translated into Dutch from the original French. She was a pupil of Leo van Puyvelde along with Marie-Louise Hairs and her 1938 doctoral thesis on Flemish still life painting for the University of Liège was published later in 1956. She is credited with the first academic study of Flemish still-life painters such as Jacob van de Kerckhoven and Andries Daniels. She was awarded Chevalier de l'Ordre de Léopold for service in the arts.

== Works ==
- Corneille de Vos : portraitiste flamand (1584-1651), 1944
- Les peintres flamands de nature morte au XVIIe siècle, 1956
- Jan Vermeer, 1632-1675, 1961
- XVIIe siècle : l'âge d'or de la peinture flamande, 1989
- De Rubens à Van Dyck : l'âge d'or de la peinture flamande, 1994
