= Jan Snellinck =

Flemish painter (1544/48-1638)

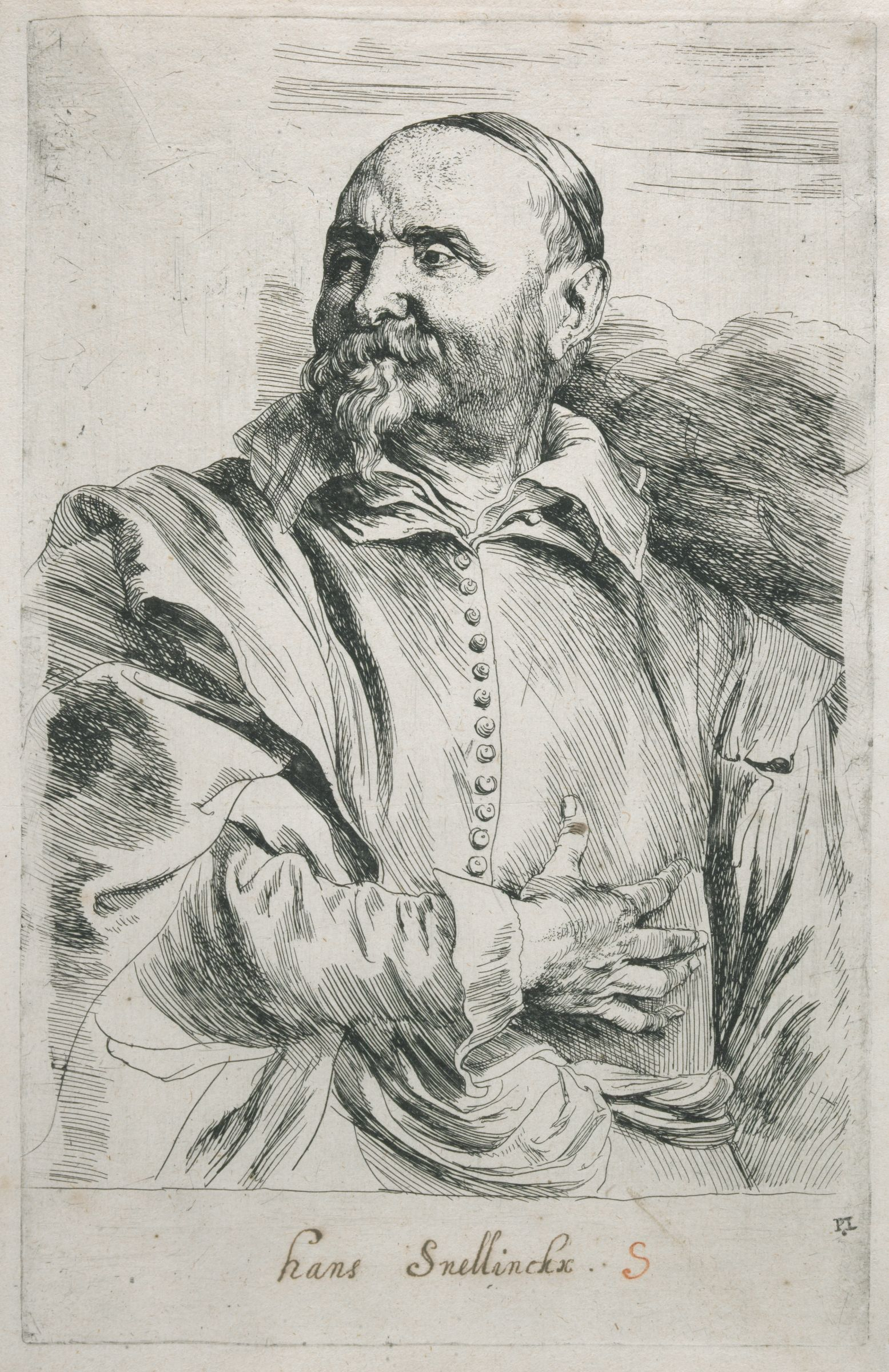
Portrait of Jan Snellinck by Anthony van Dyck

Jan Snellinck or Jan Snellinck (I) (c. 1548 – 1 October 1638) was a Flemish painter, draughtsman and designer of tapestries, prints and frescoes. He is known for his large altarpieces and was also recognized as a leading battle painter in his time. Snellinck was active as an art dealer and art collector.

== Life ==
Jan Snellinck was born in Mechelen, the son of Daniël Snellinck I, a painter and hawker, and Cornelia Verhulst (alias: Bessemeers). His mother came from a family of established artists in Mechelen. Her father and numerous uncles were painters. Her sister Mayken Verhulst married the prominent painter Pieter Coecke van Aelst and was the mother-in-law of Pieter Brueghel the Elder. Another sister Elisabeth married the prominent printmaker and publisher Hubertus Goltzius.

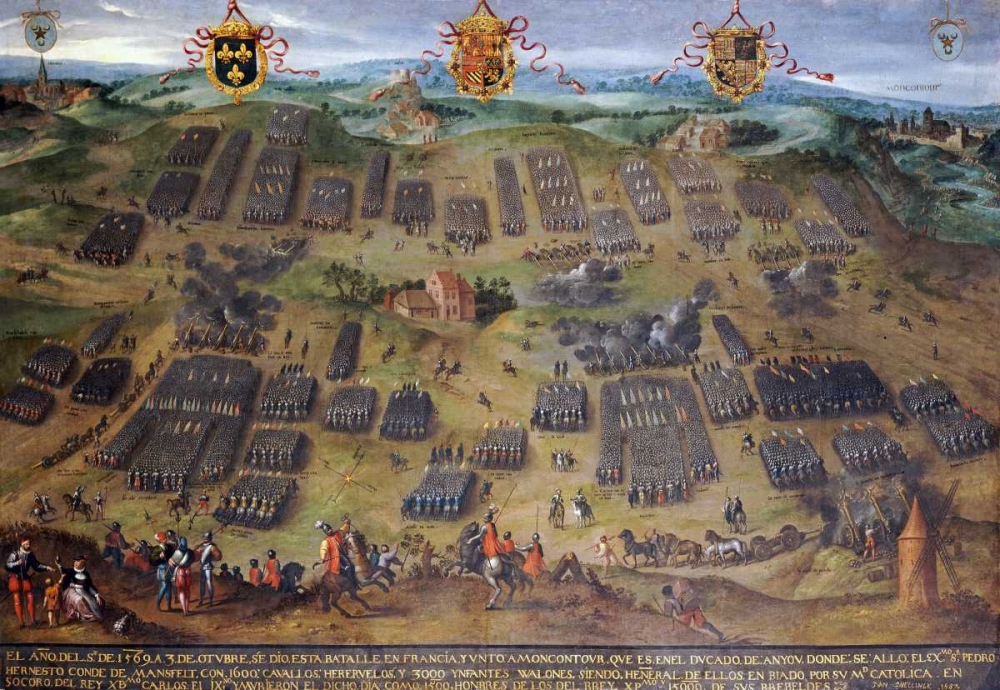
The Battle of Moncontour, 30 October 1569

Jan Snellinck maintained a close relationship with the Brueghel family and was a witness at the weddings of both Pieter Brueghel the Younger in 1588 and Jan Brueghel the Elder in 1599. He was also present at the banquet held on the return of the latter from his study trip to Italy.

Snellinck studied with his father as a watercolor painter. He converted to the Calvinist faith but converted back to Catholicism after the Spanish retook Flanders.

In 1574 Snellinck was in Antwerp where he got married on 10 July of that year to Helena de Jode, a daughter of the printmaker and publisher Gerard de Jode. The couple had three sons named Daniel, Gerard and Jan who all trained under their father to become painters. A grandson called Cornelis and a great-grandson called Jan were painters in Rotterdam. His first wife died on 12 September 1581. He remarried in 1586 to Paulina Cuypers (alias Boschmans), who was a relative (possibly the sister) of the mother of Anthony van Dyck. The couple had 10 children of whom three sons became painters.

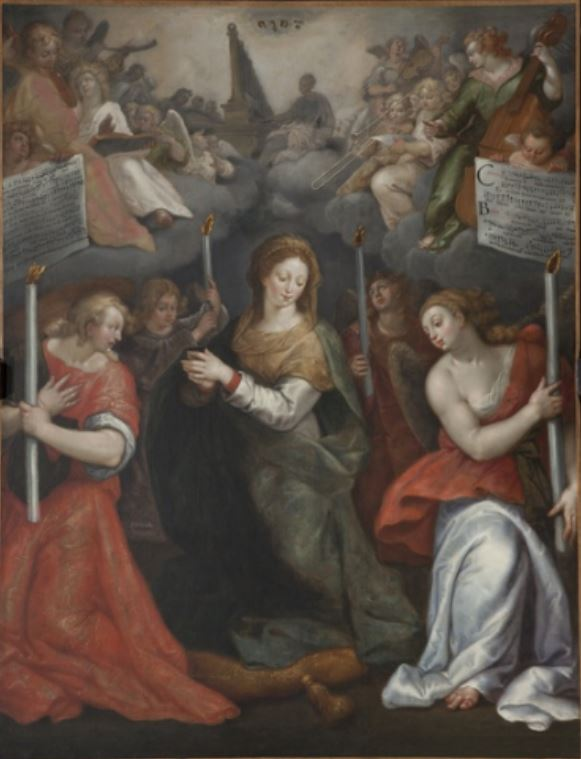
The Virgin Mary and angels singing the Magnificat

Snellinck became a master of the Antwerp Guild of St. Luke in 1577. During his initial years in Antwerp Snellinck relied more on his art dealing than on his art making to make a living. In 1577 he received his first pupil and the next one would follow only five years later. Of the 16 pupils he would receive during his very long career, only Abraham Janssens would make a name for himself. Snellinck became a poorter (burger) of Antwerp on 27 June 1597.

Snellinck gradually established a reputation as evidenced by the commissions he received from Peter Ernst I von Mansfeld-Vorderort, an Imperial and Spanish army commander of German origin and Governor of the Spanish Netherlands from 1592 to 1594, and from the Archdukes Albrecht and Isabella, who were also governors of the Spanish Netherlands from 1598 to 1621. His appointment to court painter of the Archdukes may have been related to his work on a commission by the government of Antwerp for the manufacture of a set of seven tapestry works, which were to serve as decorations on the occasion of the joyous entry in Antwerp of the Archdukes Albert and Isabella Clara Eugenia as the new governors of the Spanish Netherlands on 10 December 1599. The tapestries together with the cartoons painted by Snellinck were later gifted to the Archdukes. The tapestries were then given by Archduke Albert to King Philip III before 1621 or sent to King Philip IV after the death of Archduchess Isabella in 1633. They remained in the royal tapestry collection. Snellinck also received commissions for altarpieces in Antwerp, Mechelen and Oudenaarde.

Jan Snellinck died on 1 October 1638 in Antwerp,. His wife died five days later. Jan Snellinck left an extensive art collection. An early 17th-century painting depicting an art collection or art gallery (Attributed to Hieronymus Francken II, Royal Museums of Fine Arts of Belgium) was identified by art historian Simone Speth-Holterhoff as a representation of the art gallery or collection of Jan Snellinck. The identification was made on the basis of the presumed similarities between certain figures in the composition and contemporary portraits of known persons. It is no longer believed that this painting depicts Snellinck's collection or gallery or that of any other historic person but is rather an imaginary depiction of an art collection.

== Work ==
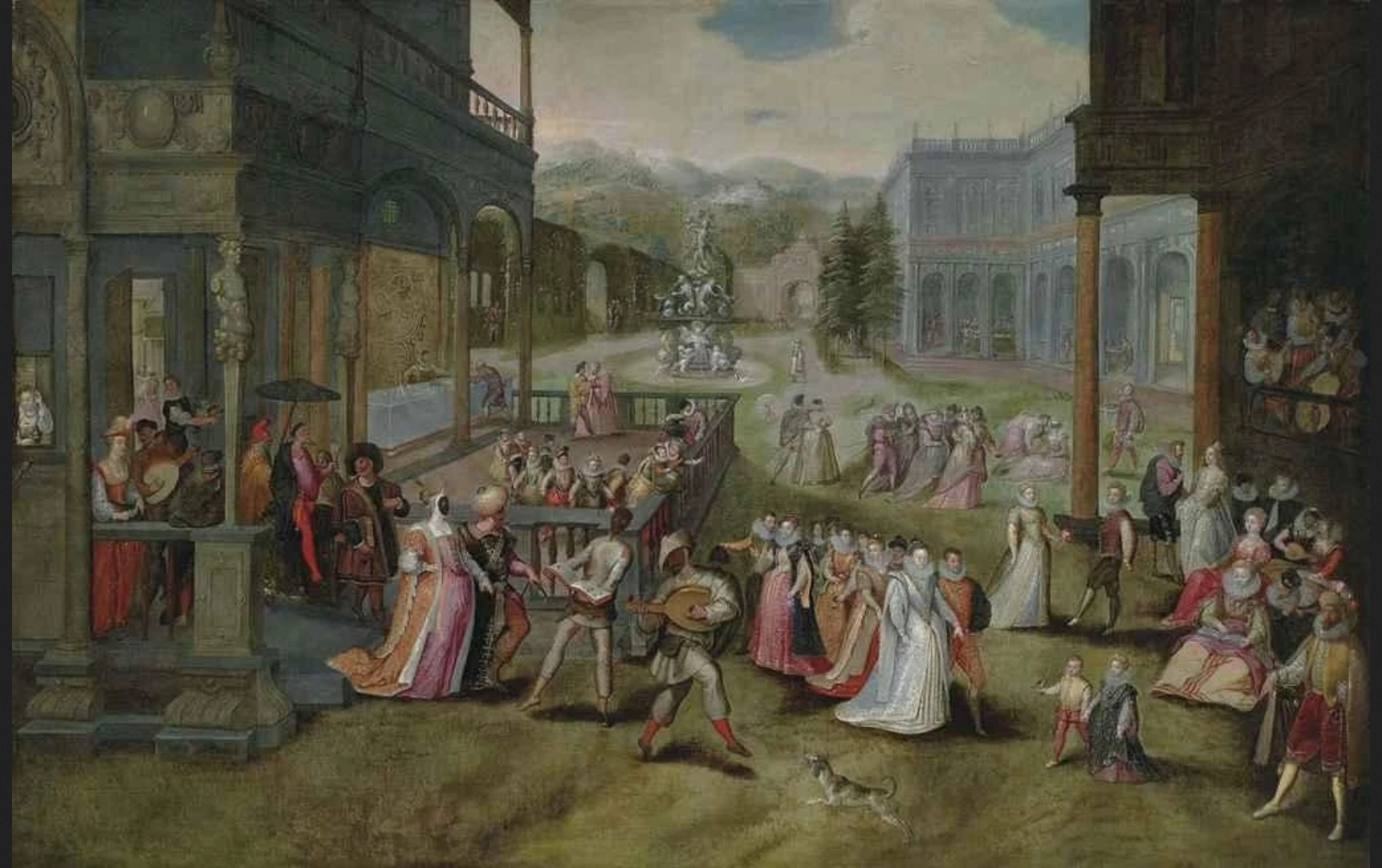
A masked ball in an Italianate courtyard

Jan Snellinck is known for his landscapes, religious and allegorical compositions. His religious subjects are often crucifixion scenes. Snellinck also painted battle scenes and elegant companies. He was also active as a painter of tapestry cartoons and a designer of prints.

Snellinck was described by contemporary art historian Karel van Mander as a battle painter and was thus the first Flemish war artist. Nine paintings of sieges by Jan Snellinck (I) were listed in the collection of Juan de Echauz in 1687. However, very little is known about his work in this area. Like many of his fellow painters from Mechelen Snellinck painted often in watercolors and this may be the reason few of his works have been preserved.

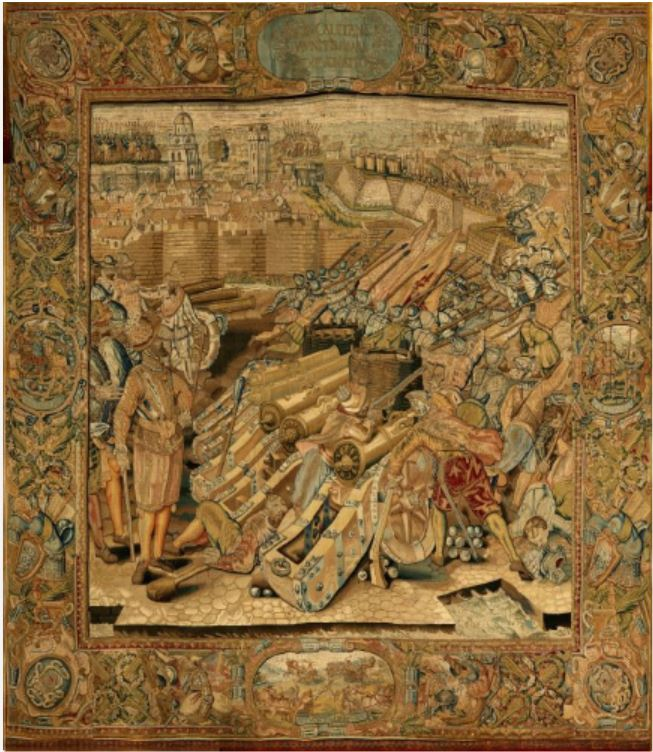
Assault on the town of Calais

A Masked ball in an Italianate courtyard, depicting a ball in the courtyard of a palace seen from a high perspective (Auctioned at Christie's on 7 December 2011, London, lot 106) and an Elegant company listening to music (Auctioned at Christie's on 7 December 2011, London, lot 106), depicting elegantly dressed men and women listening and dancing to harpsichord music, show another aspect of his work. This theme of elegant balls was introduced in Flemish art by members of the Francken family of artists such as Hieronymus Francken I.

Snellinck is known to have painted the cartoons for a number of tapestry sets woven in Flanders. He worked on a set of seven tapestry works, which were commissioned by the city of Antwerp to be used as decorations during the celebrations during the joyful entry of the Archdukes Albert and Isabella Clara Eugenia in the city on 10 December 1599. The tapestries, together with the cartoons, were gifted to the Archdukes after the event. While the tapestries later ended up in the Royal Collection in Spain, the cartoons remained in Brussels where they were later destroyed by fire or lost. The tapestry series is entitled the Battles of the Archduke Albert and depicts the military successes of Archduke Albert in Calais, Ardres and Hulst. The designs were made by Otto van Veen while Snellinck painted the full-size cartoons. The tapestries were woven in the workshop of Maarten Reymbouts the Younger in Brussels in the period from 1597 to 1599. The central panel of each tapestry depicts a military action including portraits of some of the military leaders involved in the action including the Archduke. The borders of each tapestry are filled with war trophies, victory palms, maces and clubs while the corners are decorated with Medusa heads. Sellinck also provided a series of cartoons for armorial tapestries, with the coat-of-arms of Ambrogio Spinola (c. 1605–1619). These tapestries were also woven in the workshop of Maarten Reymbouts the Younger in Brussels.

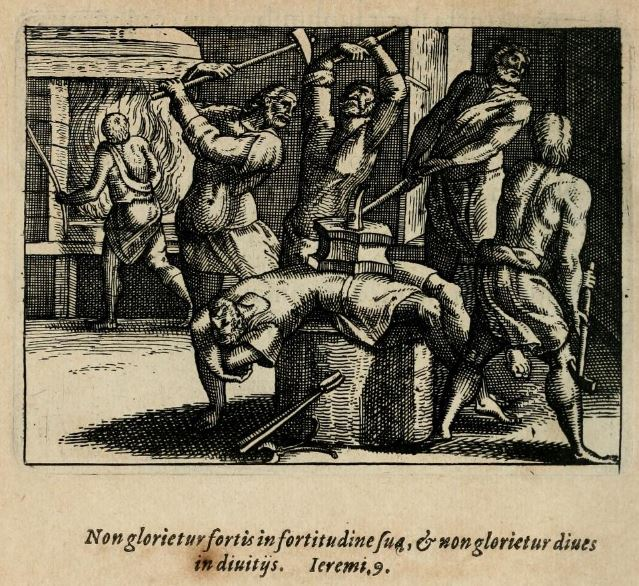
Non glorietur fortis in fortitudine sua et non-glorietur dives in divitiis sui, from the 'Parvus Mundus'

Snellinck's designs were used in various publications, some of which were published by his father-in-law Gerard de Jode, a prominent publisher of his time. One of these publications was the illustrated bible Thesaurus veteris et novi Testamenti published by Gerard de Jode in 1585. The prints were designed by at least 14 Flemish artists including Maerten de Vos, Crispijn van den Broeck, Pieter van der Borcht the Elder and Marten van Cleve. To Jan Snellinck have been attributed the design of about 50 prints in this illustrated bible. De Jode relied for the Thesaurus largely on existing prints and likely ordered missing designs from his son-in-law Snellinck. Snellinck also provided the designs for the emblem book Μικροκόσμος. Parvus Mundus (the Small World) by Laurentius Haechtanus. This book was published by Gerard de Jode in 1579. Seven design drawings of Snellinck for the publication are in the collection of the Rijksmuseum were they are attributed to Crispijn van den Broeck. Two further designs are in the British Museum were they are attributed to Karel van Mander.
