= Cornelis Snellinck =

Dutch painter

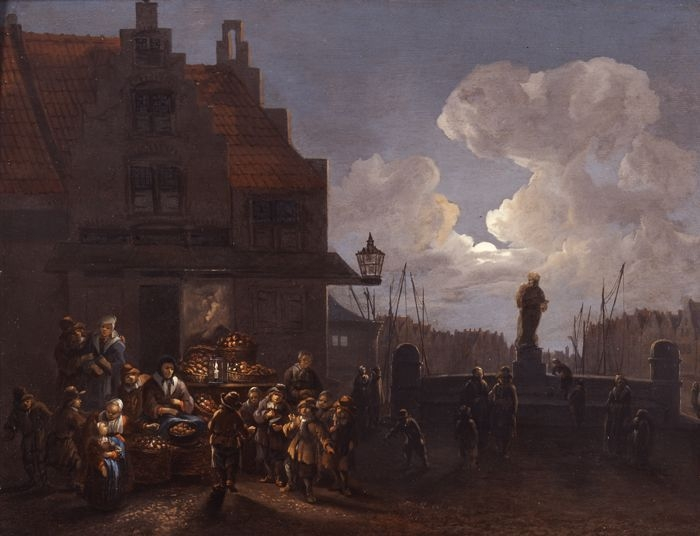
Fruit market in Rotterdam, at night

Cornelis Snellinck (c. 1605 in Antwerp or Rotterdam – c. 1669 in Rotterdam) was a Dutch landscape painter of Flemish descent. He worked his entire career in Rotterdam and is known for his forest landscapes, landscapes with religious and mythological scenes and city scenes.

== Life ==
Cornelis Snellinck was born in Antwerp or Rotterdam as the son of Jan Snellinck the Younger, a Flemish genre and history painter. His mother was Adriana Caymox, daughter of the art dealer and bookseller Heuprecht Caymox, whom his father had married on 22 October 1604 in Nuremberg. His father and mother travelled a lot and for this reason it is not clear where Cornelis was born. The date of his birth is also not known with certainty.

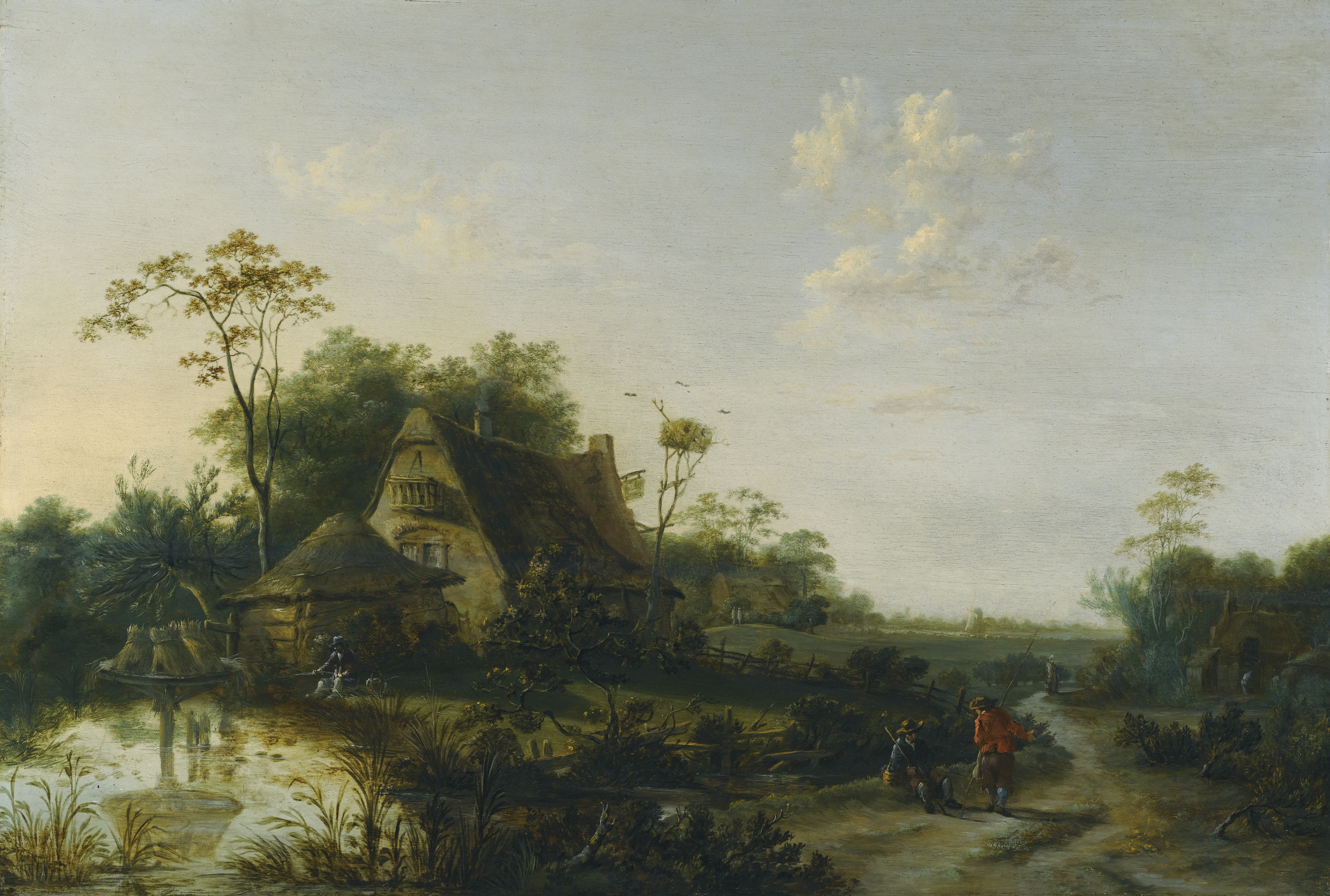
Landscape with figures passing by a cottage and a pond

Cornelis' father was the son of the prominent Flemish painter and art dealer Jan Snellinck the Elder, who was originally from Mechelen and worked most of his career in Antwerp. Cornelis Snellinck's uncles Daniel and Gerard were also painters. Cornelis likely trained with his father.

Cornelis married Maertje Jans in Rotterdam on 13 June 1638. The couple's son Jan also became a landscape painter in the style of his father. Cornelis Snellinck's career was entirely linked to Rotterdam and many of his compositions are believed to depict local landscapes.

The death date and place of Cornelis Snellinck are not known but it is believed that he died in 1669 in Rotterdam.

== Work ==
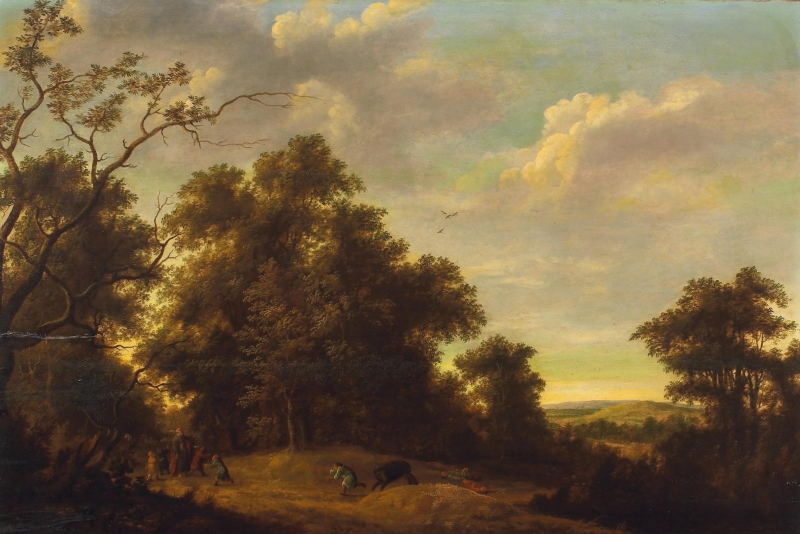
Landscape with the mocking children punished by Elisha

Cornelis Snellinck painted forest landscapes, landscapes with religious and mythological scenes and city scenes. He created forest landscapes before Jacob van Ruisdael but was influenced by Ruisdael in his later work as shown in the monumentality of his compositions.

Cornelis Snellinck placed his landscapes on a low horizon line, so that the sky takes up the larger portion of the composition. He used color schemes and light falling obliquely on an area of the canvas to achieve depth. He placed human figures and animals to animate his scenes with tall trees, small rivers and farmhouses.

Cornelis Snellinck painted a number of landscape scenes set at night. This includes the Fruit market in Rotterdam, at night (Museum Rotterdam) and the Journey of the three magi to Bethlehem (Musée de la Ville de Poitiers).

There is a lot of similarity between his work and that of his son Jan. A work in the National Gallery in Prague originally attributed to Cornelis is now attributed to the son Jan.
