= Abraham Janssens =

Flemish painter (1575–1632)

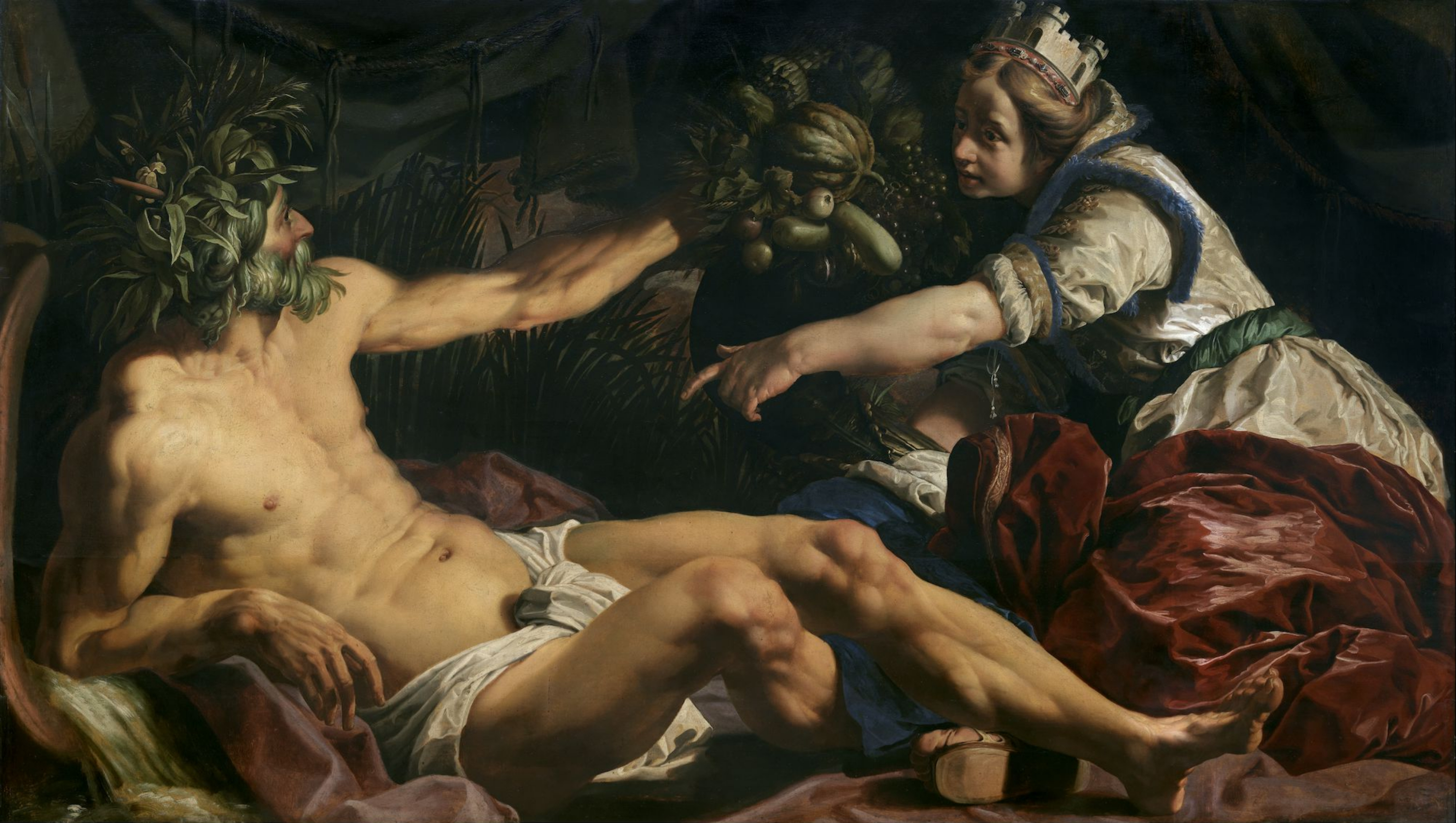
Scaldis and Antverpia

Abraham Janssens I, Abraham Janssen I or Abraham Janssens van Nuyssen (1575–1632) was a Flemish painter, who is known principally for his large religious and mythological works, which show the influence of Caravaggio. He was the leading history painter in Flanders prior to the return of Rubens from Italy.

== Life ==
Abraham Janssens was born in Antwerp as the son of Jan Janssens and Roelofken van Huysen or Nuyssen. There is some uncertainty regarding his year of birth. He was previously thought to have been born in the year 1567, but it is now more generally assumed that his date of birth was 1575.

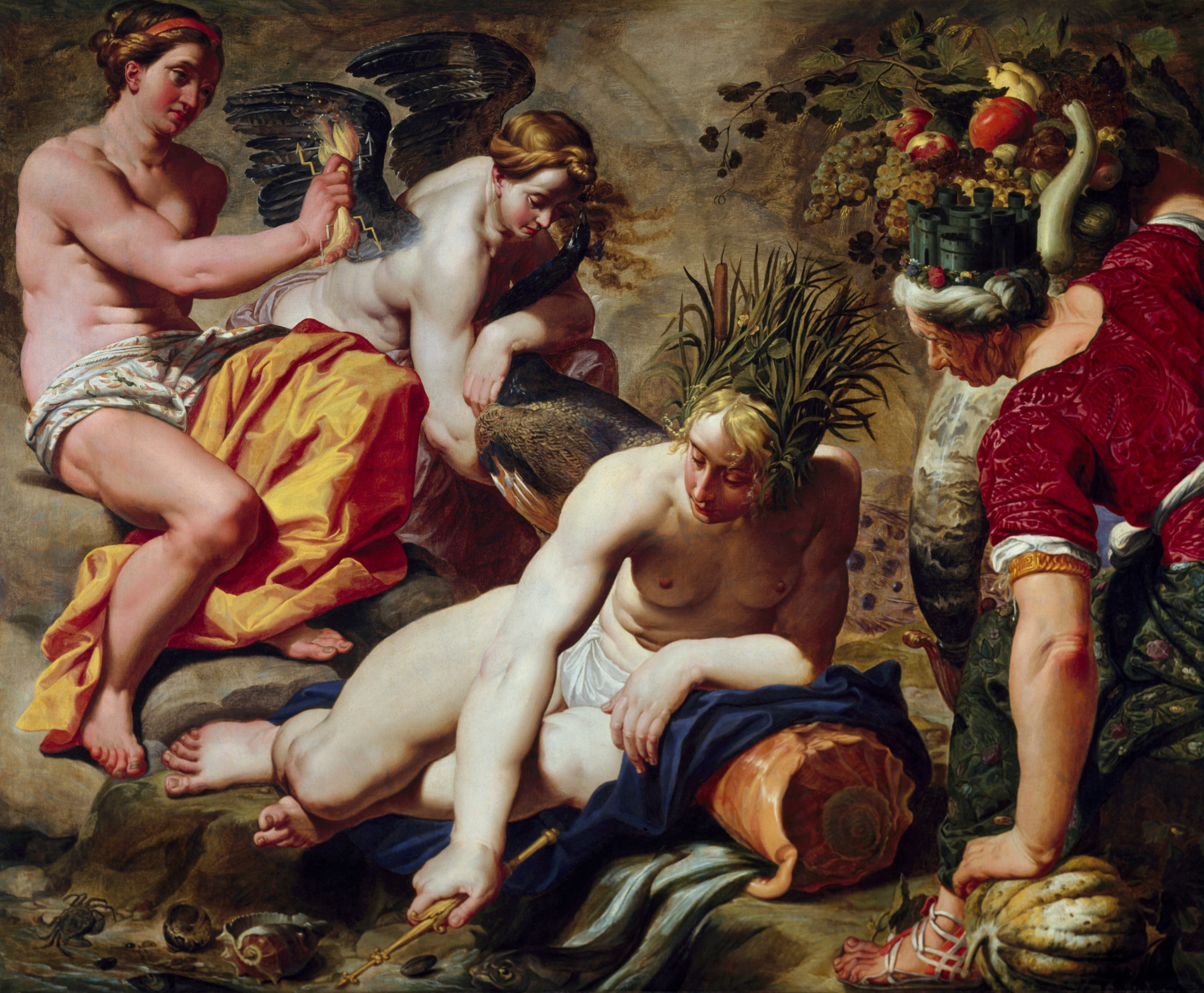
The Four Elements

Janssens studied under Jan Snellinck and was registered as a pupil in the local Guild of Saint Luke in 1585. He travelled to Italy where he resided mainly in Rome between 1597 and 1602. After returning to his home country he became a master in the Antwerp Guild in the guild year 1601–1602.

On 1 May 1602 he married Sara Goetkint (died in Antwerp on 7 April 1644) with whom he had 8 children, five of whom were still alive at the time of her death: Maria Anna, who also became a painter and married Jan Brueghel the Younger, Sara, Catharina, Lucretia and Abraham II.

In 1607 he became the dean of the Antwerp Guild of St Luke. This is also the time when he received his first major commissions, which initiated the most important period of his career. Until the return of Rubens to Antwerp in 1608, Janssens was considered the leading history painter active in the Low Countries. His fame was not immediately eclipsed by Rubens' return as he was still able to obtain important commissions such as that for his masterpiece Scaldis and Antverpia commissioned by the Antwerp city magistrate to decorate the chimney in the city hall's Assembly Room where the Twelve Years' Truce between Spain and the Dutch Republic was signed on 9 April 1609. After Rubens became the dominant force for large altarpieces in the Antwerp market, Janssens had to find commissions for large monumental works from provincial patrons.

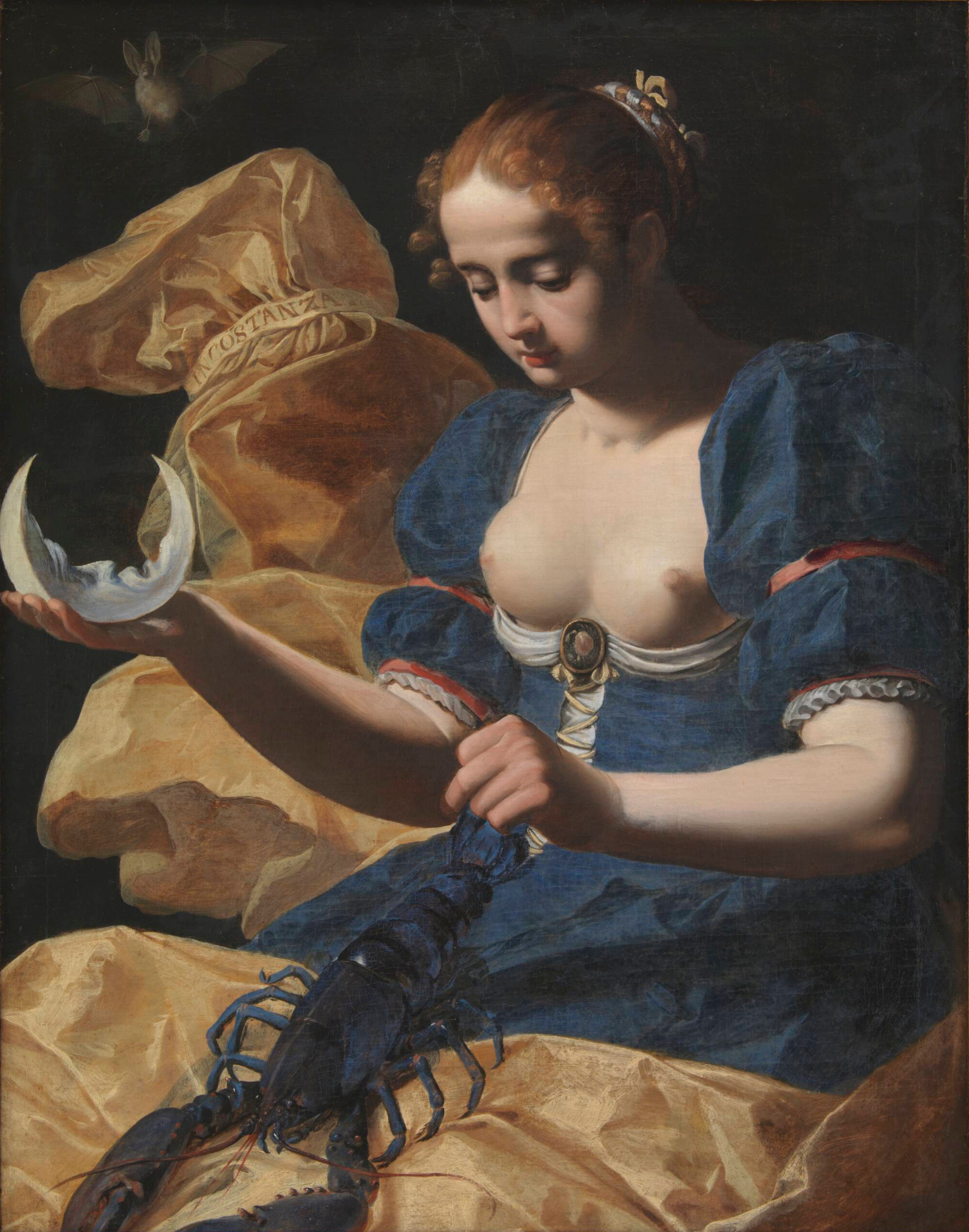
Allegory of Fickleness

Janssens joined in 1610 the Confrerie of Romanists, a society of Antwerp humanists and artists who had travelled to Rome. The diversity and high positions held by the Confrerie's membership offered him a good opportunity to meet with potential patrons.

Janssens died in Antwerp. His pupils included his son Abraham Janssens II, Giovanni di Filippo del Campo, Michele Desubleo, Nicolas Régnier, Gerard Seghers, Theodoor Rombouts and Steven Wils.

== Work ==
=== General ===
Janssens painted both religious, mythological and allegorical scenes, and occasionally a portrait. He also painted genre-style scenes representing the five senses or the seven deadly sins.

Janssens affixed the signature "Janssens van Nuyssen" to several of his pictures. It is believed that 'van Nuyssen' was the family name of his mother and that Janssens added it to his signature to distinguish himself from his namesakes as the family name Janssens was very common in 17th-century Flanders.

It is difficult to determine the chronology of Janssens's oeuvre, as he only dated or documented a few of his works.

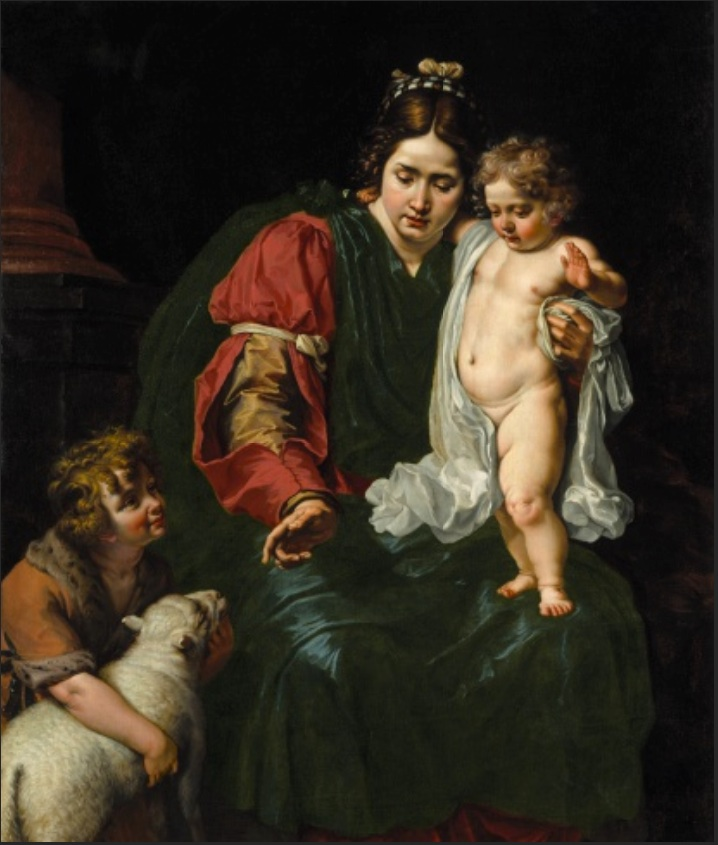
The Virgin and Child with the infant St John the Baptist

=== Early works ===
His earliest works are steeped in late 16th-century Mannerism and are characterized by an artificial design and a palette composed of dispersing colours. An example is his earliest dated picture Diana and Callisto of 1601 (Museum of Fine Arts, Budapest), which demonstrates that at the time he was less influenced by Italian painting than by the late Mannerist style that was at the time being developed in Utrecht and Haarlem and drew inspiration from the work of the Flemish painter Bartholomeus Spranger. The work Diana and Callisto does, however, rely on Italian sculpture of both Antiquity and the Renaissance, as does his later work.

Following his return to Antwerp in 1602 Janssens's work displayed a strong reliance on Raphael. This is clear in the composition Mount Olympus (Alte Pinakothek, Munich) which shows the combination of Janssens's study of the Antique and of Michelangelo, during his stay in Italy and through prints which he could access in Antwerp.

From 1606 onwards, his style started to show the influence of Caravaggio. It is believed that this was a response to new tendencies in the Antwerp school of painting around this time. He painted in this style for about five to six years.

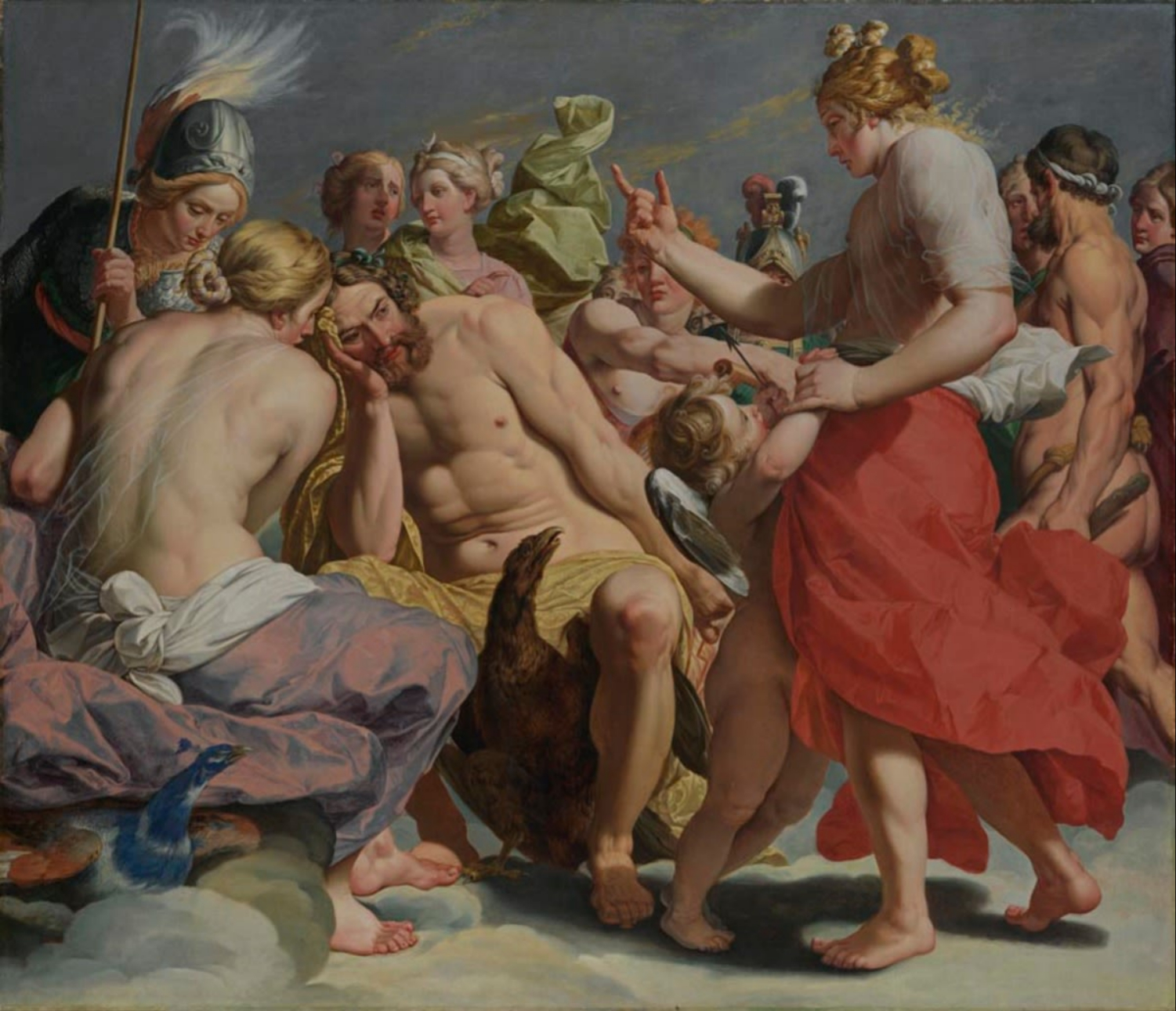
Mount Olympus

His composition Scaldis and Antverpia (also referred to as Allegory of the Scheldt) of 1609 (Royal Museum of Fine Arts Antwerp) is a key work of Janssens's Caravaggesque period. It was commissioned by the Antwerp city magistrate to decorate the chimney in the city hall's Assembly Room where the Twelve Years' Truce between Spain and the Dutch Republic was signed on 9 April 1609. Rubens also received a commission for the same occasion. It was hoped that the Truce would bring new prosperity and trade to Antwerp, for which the city had traditionally relied on the river Scheldt. The subject of the work is therefore Scaldis (the river Scheldt) and Antverpia (the city of Antwerp). This work was made when Janssens's artistic powers had reached their peak. The figure of Scaldis is inspired by the statute of the Tiber on the Capitoline Hill while the composition itself resembles Michelangelo's The Creation of Adam. This work shows how Janssens's style had developed towards a classic academic beauty, harmonious in form and with an unbroken palette. The influence of Caravaggio is seen in the use of strong contrasts of light and shadow (chiaroscuro) to create expressive power, while the influence of the School of Bologna can be found in his search for noble classicism. The preference of Janssens for sculptural form impairs the drama of the work as the figures are represented in frozen poses and expression. Still it remains possible that this impressive work had some influence on Rubens' painting as there are, for example, similarities in the colour of the garments of the female protagonists in Rubens' Samson and Delilah (c. 1609–10; National Gallery, London).

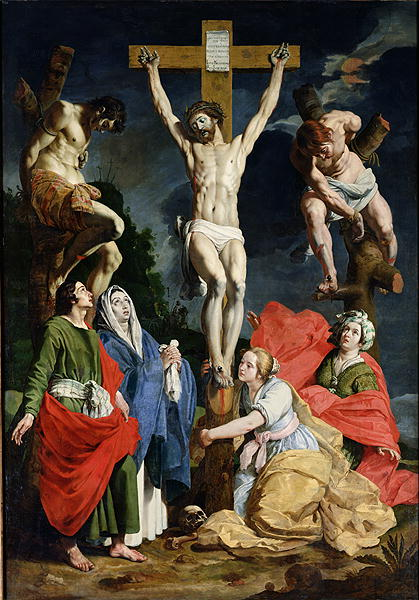
The crucifixion

Other works dating to this overtly Caravaggesque period are the Allegory of the burdens of time (Royal Museums of Fine Arts of Belgium, 1609), Peace and plenty (Wolverhampton Art Gallery, 1614), which was also commissioned for the Antwerp city hall's Assembly Room, and The dead Christ in the tomb with two angels (Metropolitan Museum of Art, c. 1610). The latter painting was likely commissioned as an altarpiece. This Caravaggesque composition predates comparable Dutch works such as Dirck van Baburen's Roman charity by a decade.

=== Later works ===
Janssens's later work is regarded as less convincing. After 1612 his painting style, like that of his other colleagues in Antwerp, came under the strong influence of the free style of Rubens' pictorial technique. Janssens's paintings of half-length figures were still regarded as innovative and influential while his devotional pictures were also successful. A good example of the latter is The crucifixion (Musée des beaux-arts de Valenciennes, c. 1620) in which the figures look painted like sculptures and take on an iconic timelessness.
