= Marie-Louise Hairs =

Belgian art historian (1912–1998)

- Born: July 23, 1912; Liège
- Died: 1998 (aged 85–86)

Marie-Louise Hairs (1912 – 1998) was a Belgian art historian specializing in Flemish still-life flower paintings of the 17th century.

Her overview of the Flemish flower painters of the 17th century was reprinted and excerpted several times during her lifetime. She is credited with the first academic study of Flemish flower garland painters. She wrote a chapter on flower painting in the 1989 overview of Flemish golden age painting by Edith Greindl.

== Works ==
- André Daniels : peintre de fleurs Anversois : vers 1600, 1951
- Osias Beert l'Ancien : peintre de fleurs, 1951
- Les peintres Flamands de fleurs au XVIIe siècle, 1955
- Gaspard Thielens, peintre flamand du dix-septième siècle, 1959
- Pour un tricentenaire : Daniel Seghers (1590-1661), 1960
- Les peintres Flamands de fleurs au XVIIe siècle, 1965
- Théodore van Thulden 1606-1669 : oeuvres signées ou attestées sur document, 1965
- Jan Anton van der Baren : monographie, 1970
- XVIIe siècle : l'âge d'or de la peinture flamande, 1989
