= The Satyr and the Peasant (Jordaens) =

Group of paintings by Jacob Jordaens and his workshop

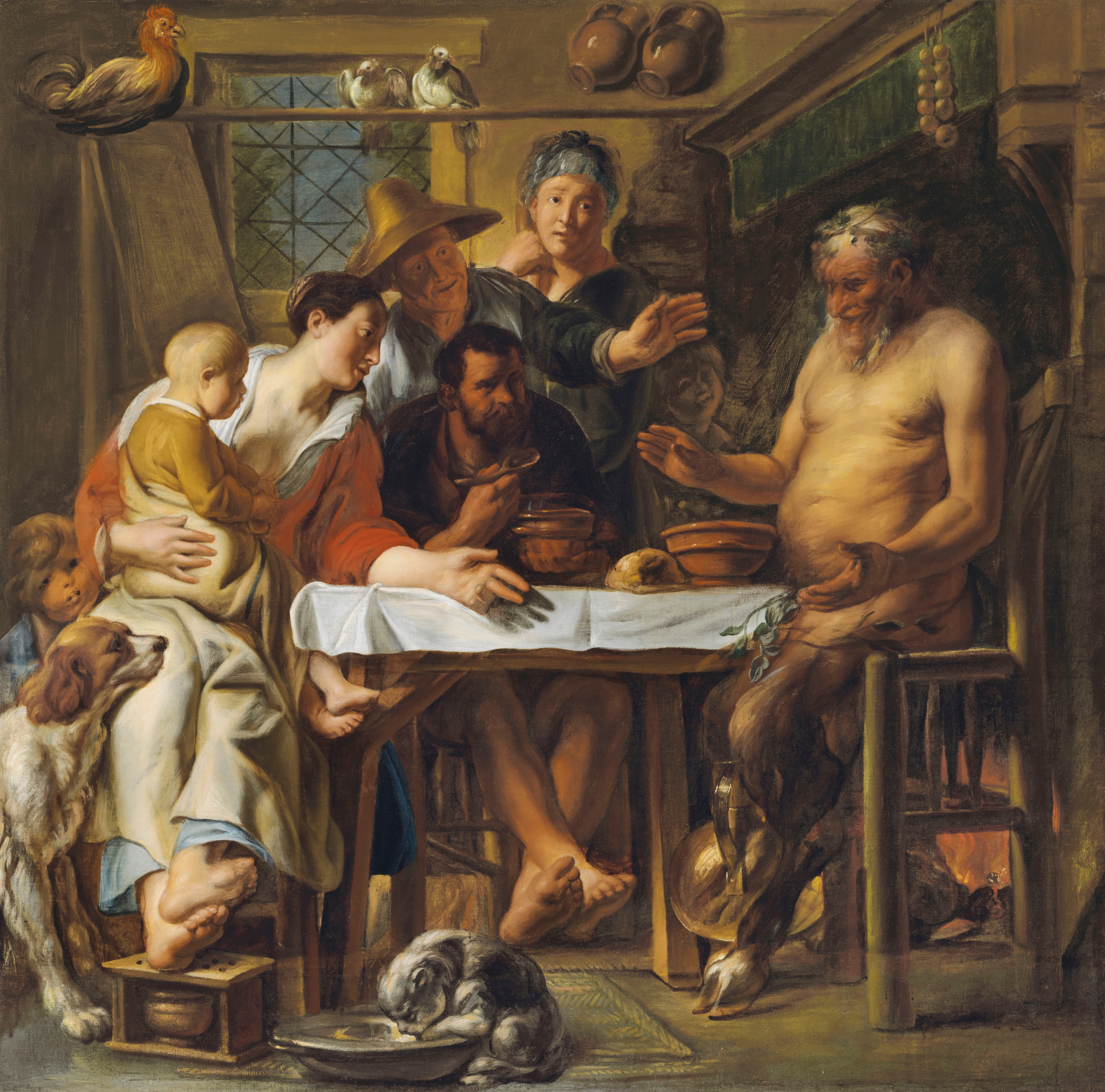
The Satyr and the Peasant, c. 1650, at Christie's

The Satyr and the Peasant or The Satyr and the Peasant Family is the title commonly given to a number of paintings executed by the Flemish Baroque painter Jacob Jordaens and his workshop based on the fable of the Satyr and the Peasant from Aesop's Fables. Jordaens returned regularly to this subject from his earliest active years until his mature period around 1650. In his treatment of the subject, he combines two of the painting genres in which he excelled: mythological painting and the peasant genre. His various interpretations of the subject and the many repetitions of these works by his workshop and followers popularized the theme which was then taken up by Flemish and Dutch painters such as Jan Cossiers and Jan Steen.

== The story background ==
In an illustrated version of the fable published in London in 1874 with illustrations by Ernest Griset the story is told as follows: A satyr ranging in the forest in winter, came across a traveller half starved with the cold. He took pity on him and invited him to go to his cave. On their way the man kept blowing upon his fingers. “Why do you do that?” said the satyr, who had seen little of the world. “To warm my hands, they are nearly frozen,” replied the man. Arrived at the cave, the satyr poured out a mess of smoking pottage and laid it before the traveller, who at once commenced blowing at it with all his might. “What, blowing again!” cried the satyr. “Is it not hot enough?” “Yes, faith,” answered the man, “it is hot enough in all conscience, and that is just the reason why I blow at it.” “Be off with you!” said she Satyr, in alarm; "I will have no part with a man who can blow hot and cold from the same mouth."

The expression "to blow hot and cold" is derived from this fable. It means "to behave inconsistently; to vacillate or to waver, as between extremes of opinion or emotion." The meaning of the fable was further explained in Thomas Bewick's selection of Aesop fables of 1818: "The satyr declares he cannot trust a man who blows hot (to warm his hands) and cold (to cool his food) with the same breath. Nothing can be more offensive to a man of a sincere honest heart, than he who blows with different breaths from the same mouth: who flatters a man to his face, and reviles him behind his back. Such double-dealing false friends ought and will always be considered as unworthy of being treated otherwise than as worthless and disagreeable persons."

== Early Modern treatments of the fable ==
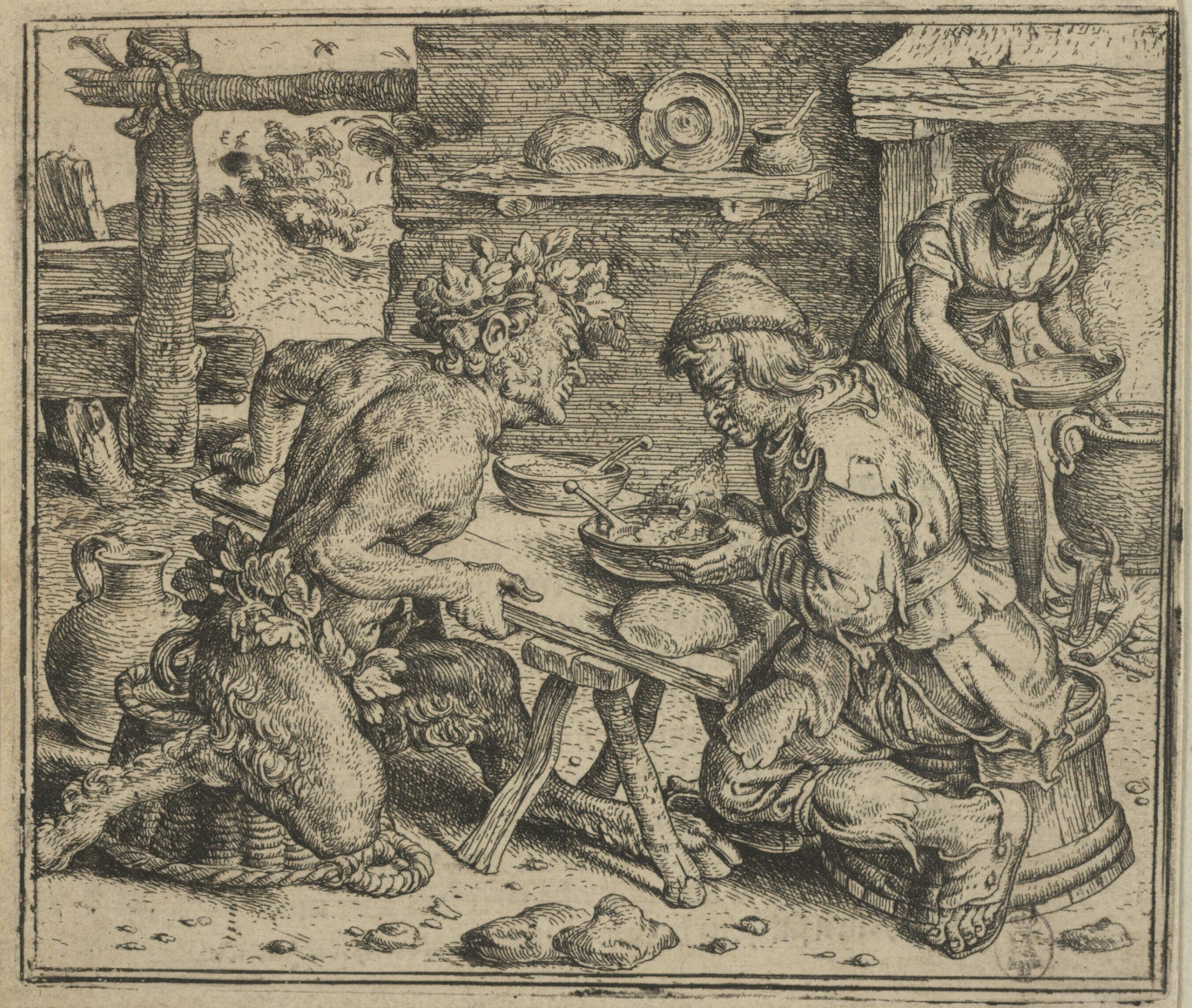
The peasant and the satyr by Marcus Gheeraerts

Aesop's Fables were printed and reprinted in many illustrated editions throughout Europe in the 16th and 17th centuries. The first illustrated version in the Dutch language was published in 1567 in Bruges by Pieter de Clerck under the title De warachtighe fabulen der dieren (The true fables of the animals). Edewaerd de Dene had written the text in the local Flemish variant of Dutch and Marcus Gheeraerts the Elder had made 107 illustrations for the fables. The book contained the story of the "Landtsman ende satyre" ('The peasant and the satyr') with an illustration showing the satyr and the peasant sitting at a table outside the satyr's lean-to shed.

In Netherlandish culture, the fable of "the Satyr and the Peasant” became quite popular. In 1617 the Dutch Catholic poet and playwright Joost van den Vondel put rhymes to the fable in his Vorstelijke Warande der dieren (The Princely Pleasure-Grounds of Animals) for which he used the older illustration made by Marcus Gheeraerts. In his rendering of the story, Vondel has the satyr flee in fear of his life, for 'The Wise man always shows love and goodwill, towards him that holds fire in one hand and water in the other, in order to avoid his evil sorcery'.”

== Jordaens's treatment of the fable ==
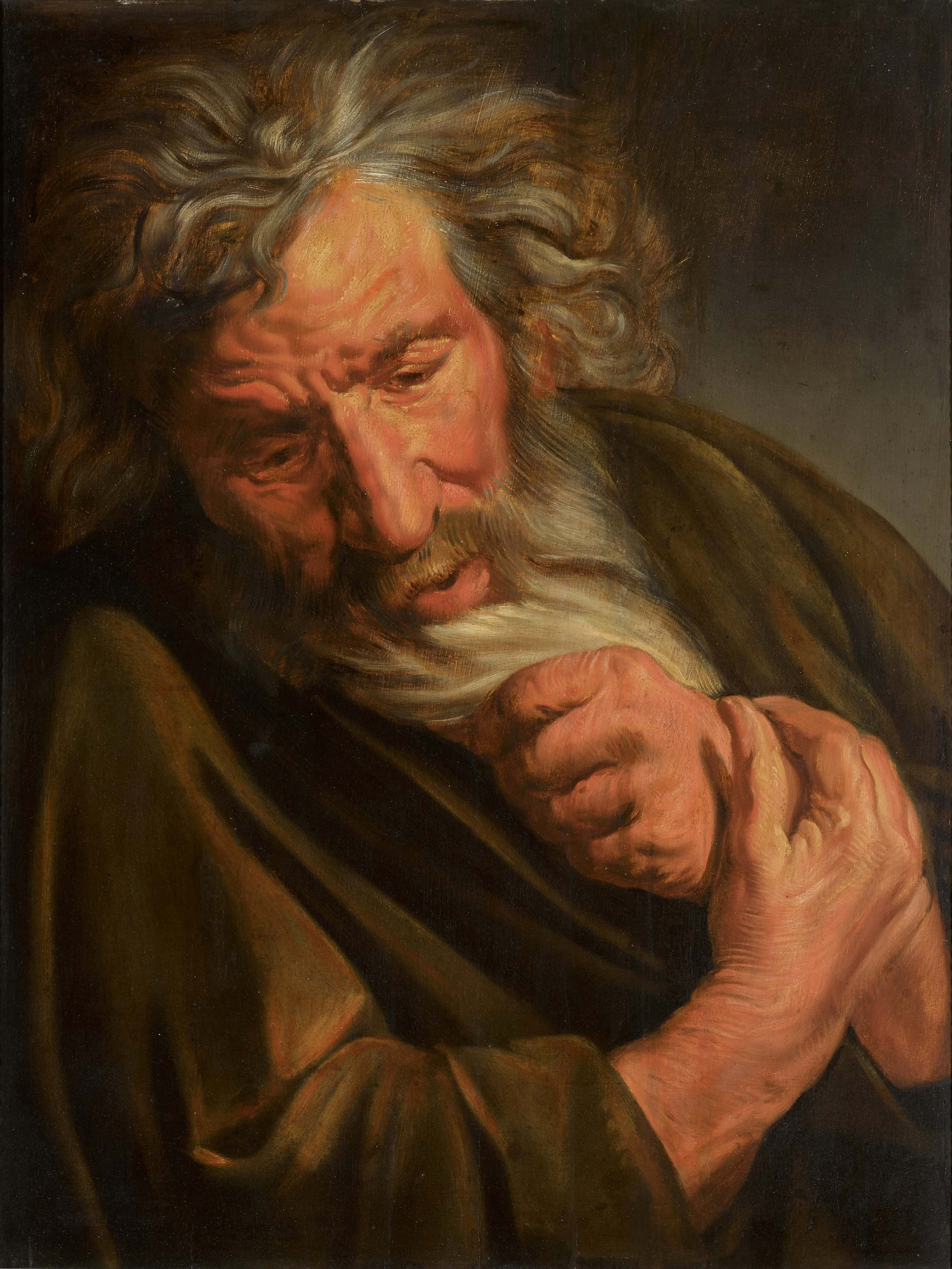
Head of an Old Man, possibly a study for the Satyr in the Gothenburg and Brussels versions

It is believed that Jordaens produced a dozen versions of the fable in various mediums. There is still debate among art historians as to which of these works are completely autograph, partially made with the assistance of Jordaens' workshop or entirely made by his workshop. There is also discussion about the chronology of the works. Some historians have suggested that the small vertical version in Glasgow, dated to circa 1616 was the earliest treatment of the subject while others have proposed the version in the Museumslandschaft Hessen Kassel, dated to circa 1620, to be the earliest, followed not long thereafter by the versions in Göteborg and Brussels. A version sold as lot 51 at Sotheby's New York City auction of 24 January 2008 has been proposed as Jordaens' second version of the subject after the Glasgow version. In this version, Jordaens used his wife and their first born, Elizabeth, who had been baptized on 26 June 1617, as models for the mother and child. A somewhat different version in the Alte Pinakothek in Munich is traditionally dated to roughly the same time period.

All of Jordaens' interpretations represent the denouement of the fable where the satyr reacts to the peasant blowing on his`soup. The Glasgow version shows the satyr ready to take off in fear, which reflects the story as told by Vondel. While the Glasgow and Kassel versions place the scene in an outdoors setting with rudimentary furnishings, the 1620 Brussels and Göteborg versions place the scene in a domestic setting in the peasant's home. The figure of the satyr changes in the various versions as he becomes greyer and heavier. He also changes from being fearful to showing a smile on his face as if he is reacting to the events in a philosophical manner. This reflects a tendency among Antwerp humanists to draw a parallel between the oldest satyr Silenus and the Ancient philosopher Socrates. Writings from Antiquity already described Silenus as someone who could impart Wisdom. Socrates was regarded by Antwerp humanists as the epitome of wisdom who had conveyed his learning through mundane examples. There was also a contrast between Socrates' ugly physical appearance and his internal wisdom. The combination of high purpose and low style is typical for much of Jordaens' entire artistic output and is in particular obvious in the Satyr and Peasant compositions. This combination has been referred to as the serio-comical style. The smiling satyr in Jordaens' the Satyr and the Peasant does not condemn the peasant's behaviour but shows a philosophical and comical ambivalence about it.

== Gallery ==
Principal versions

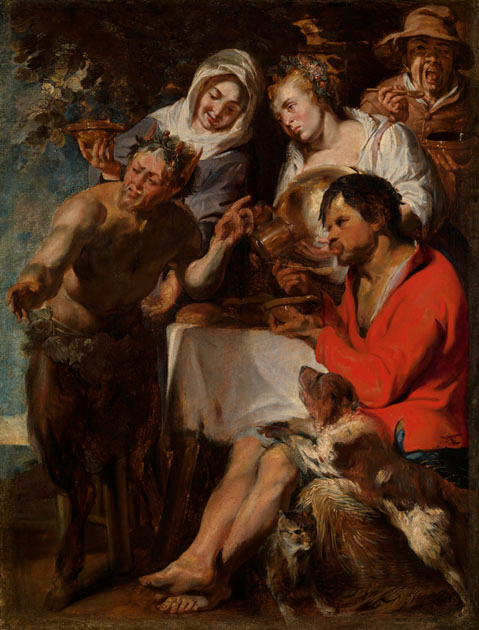
c. 1616,
Glasgow Museums Resource Centre

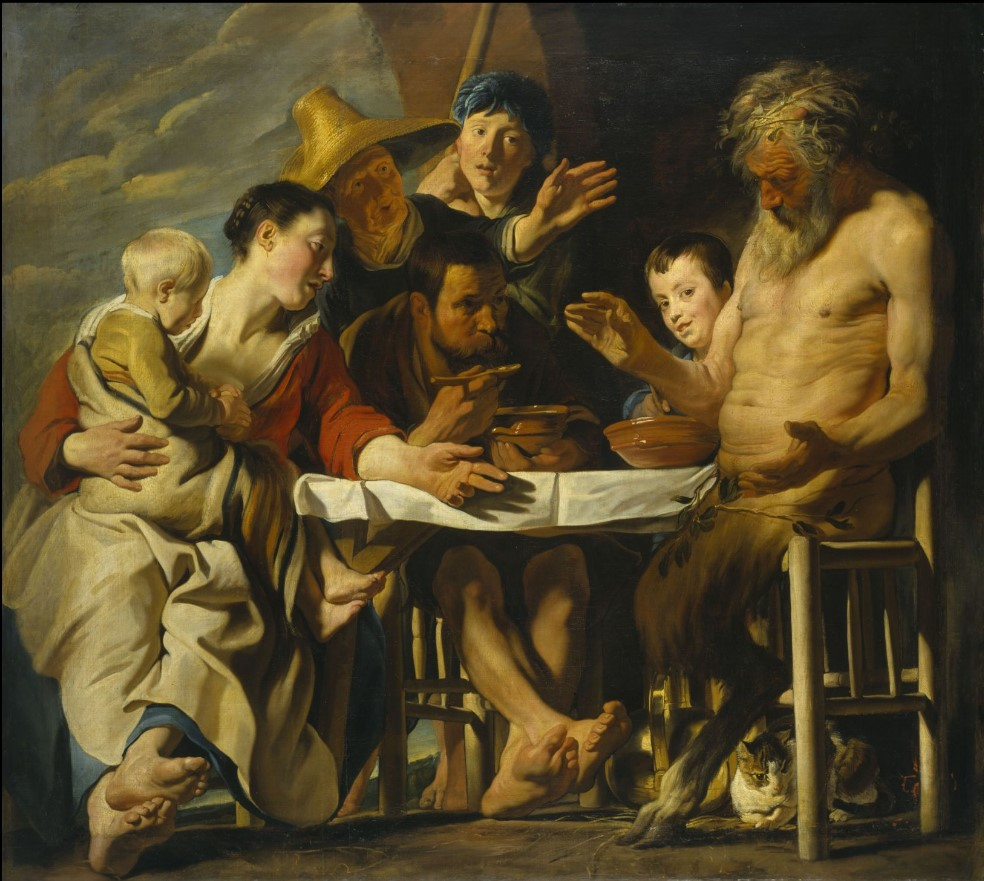
c. 1620,
Museumslandschaft Hessen Kassel

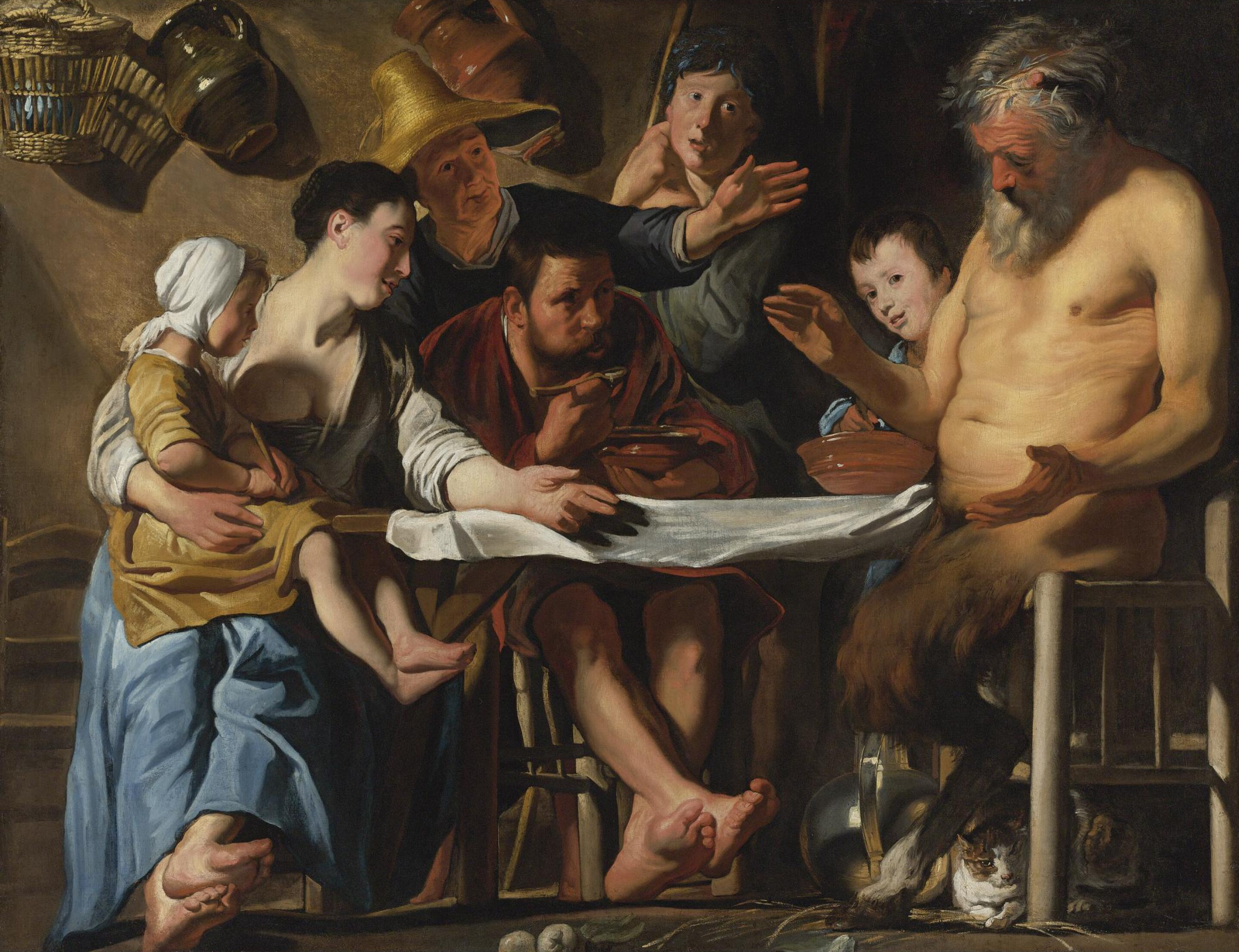
c. 1620,
Sotheby's New York, 24 January 2008, lot 51

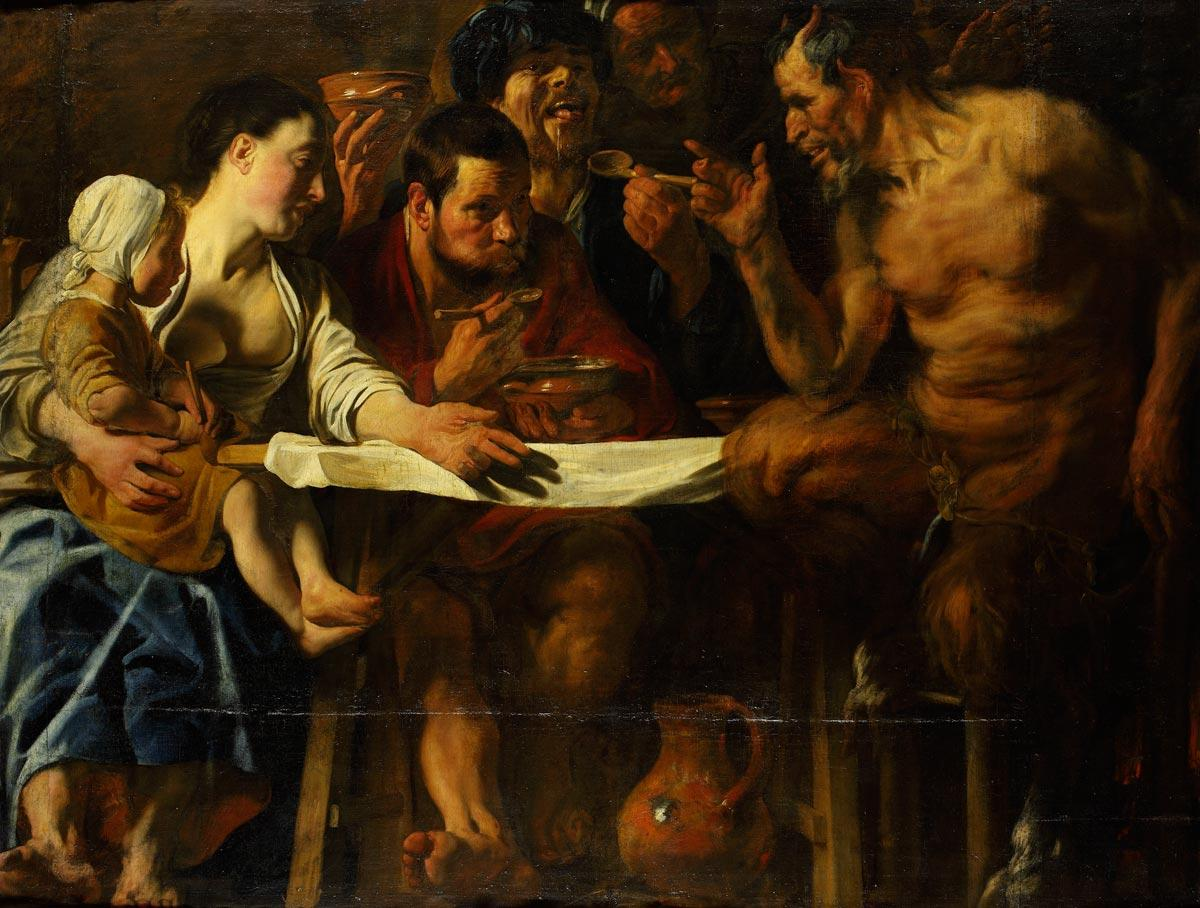
1620,
Pushkin Museum, Moscow

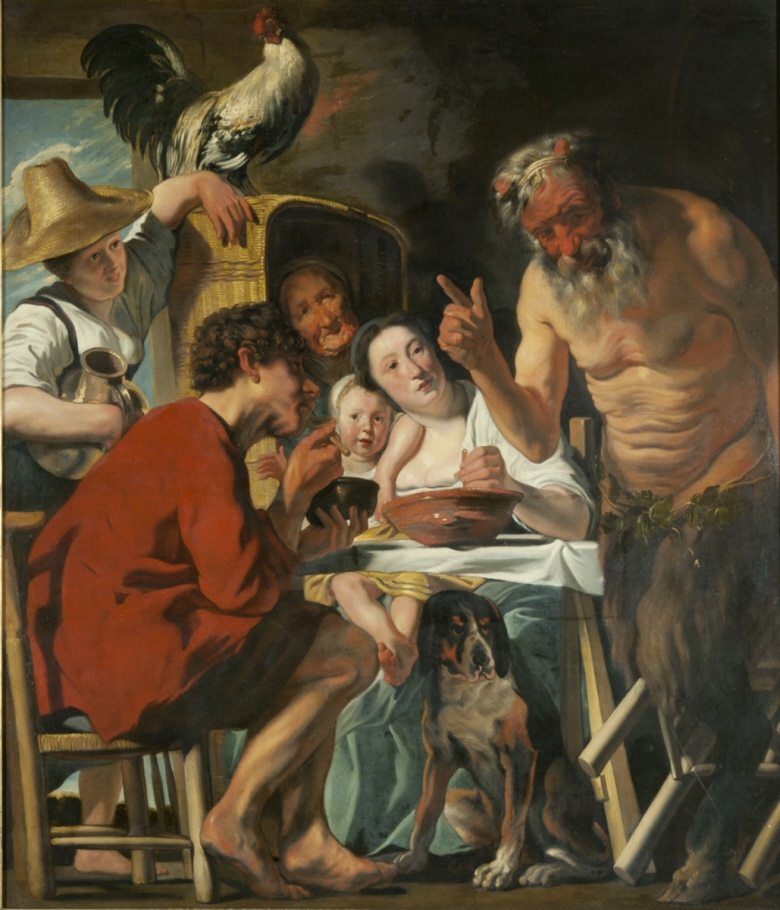
c. 1620,
Gothenburg Museum of Art

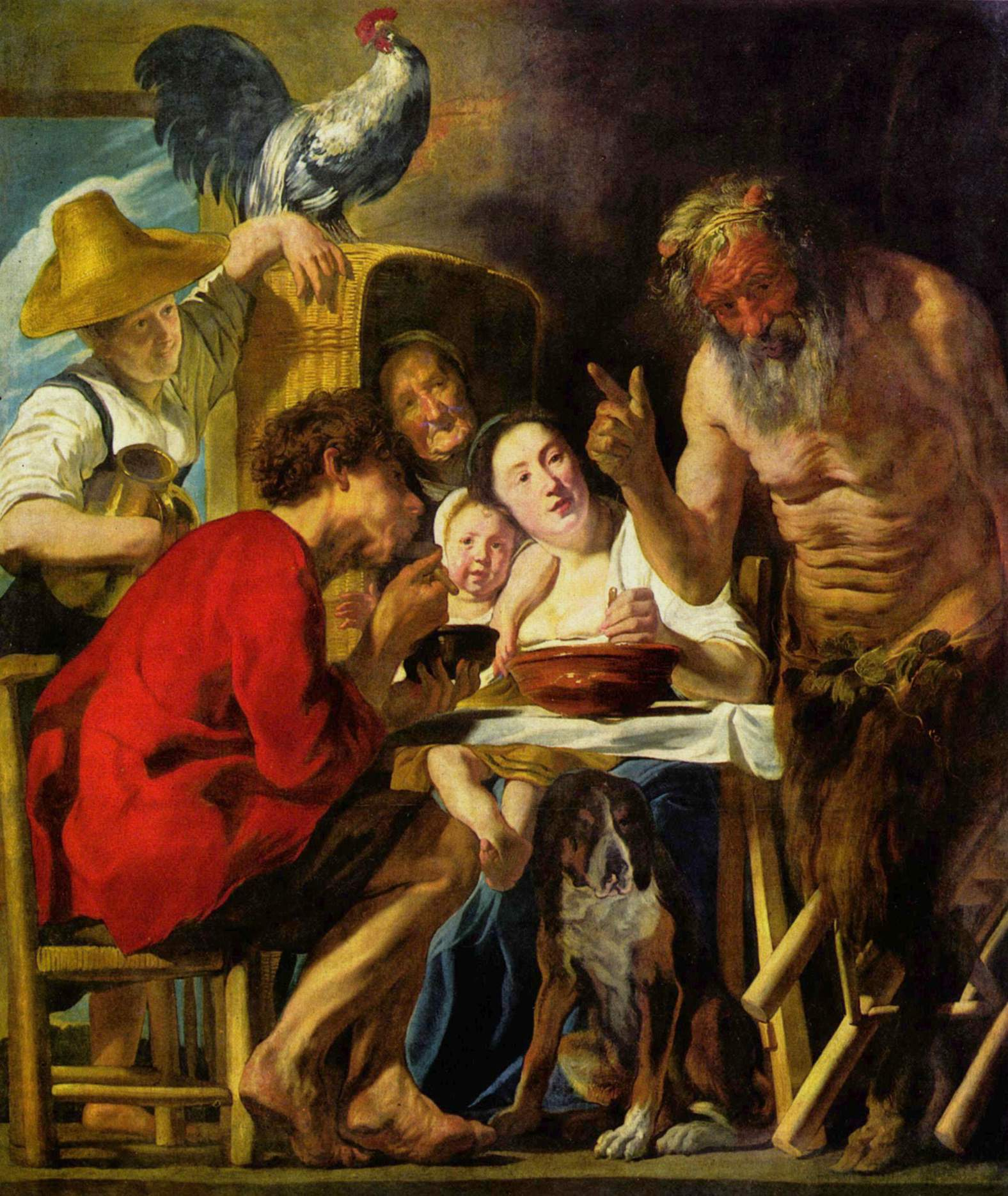
c. 1620,
Royal Museum of Fine Arts of Belgium, Brussels

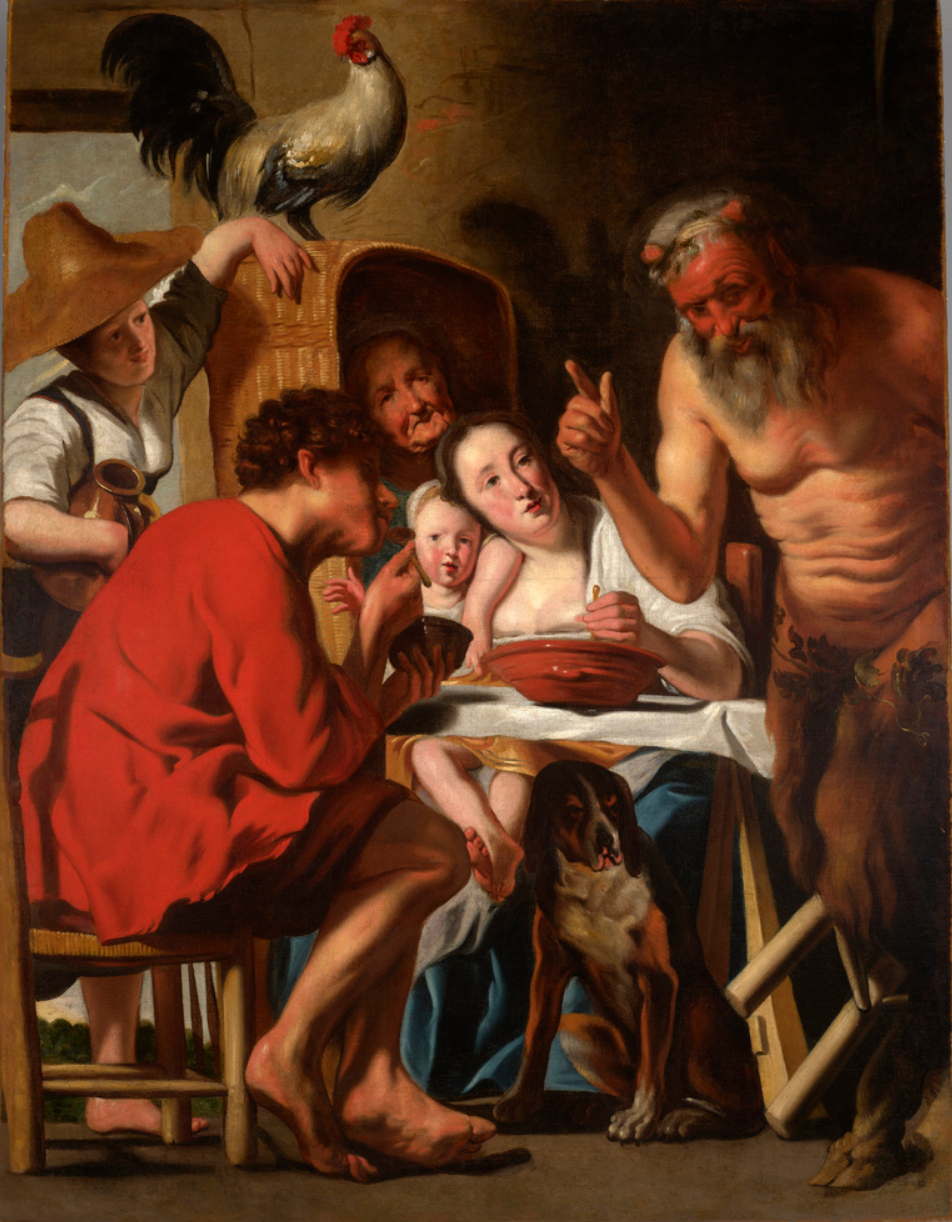
1620s,
Czartoryski Museum, Krakow

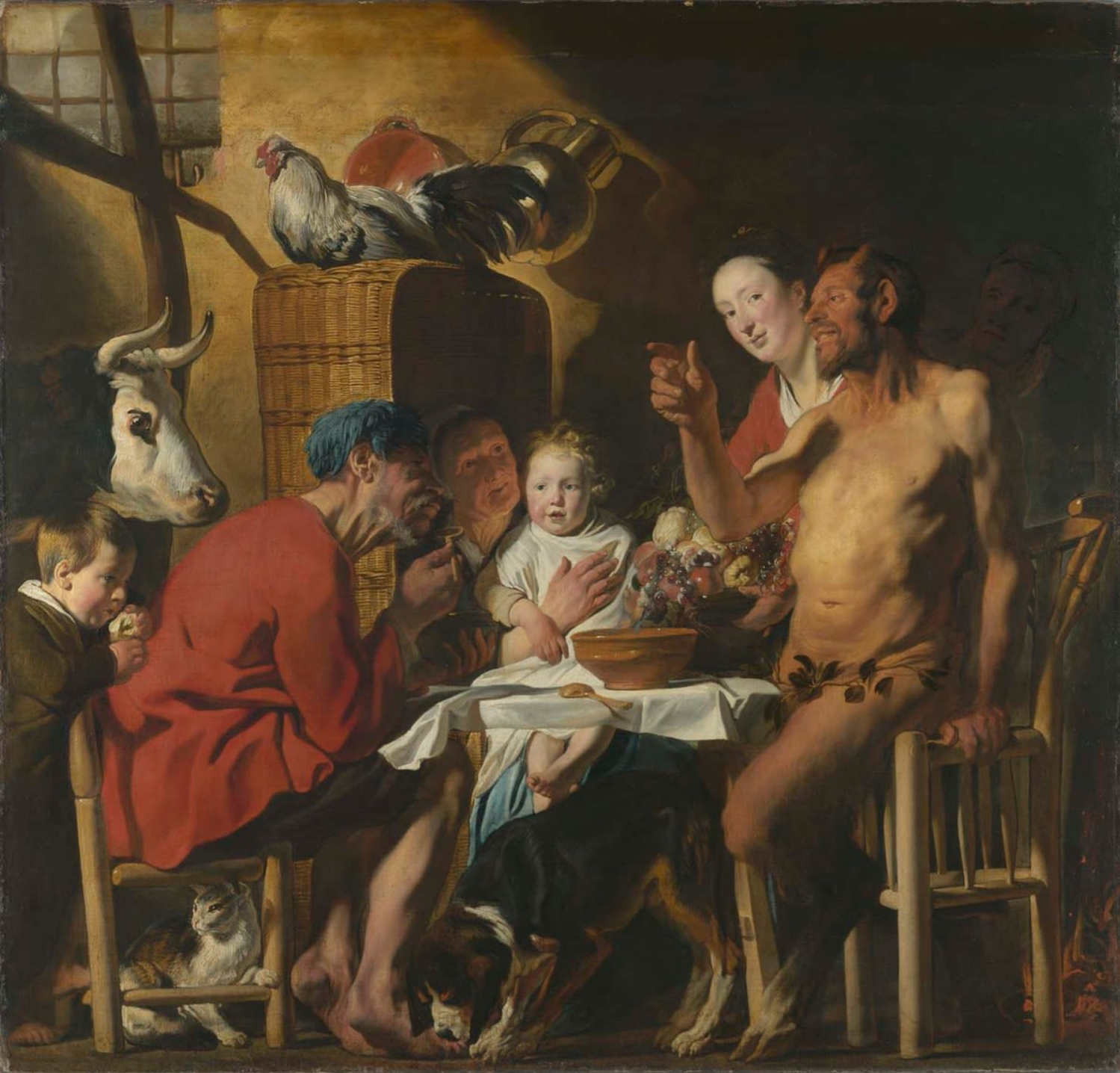
1620-1621,
Alte Pinakothek, Munich

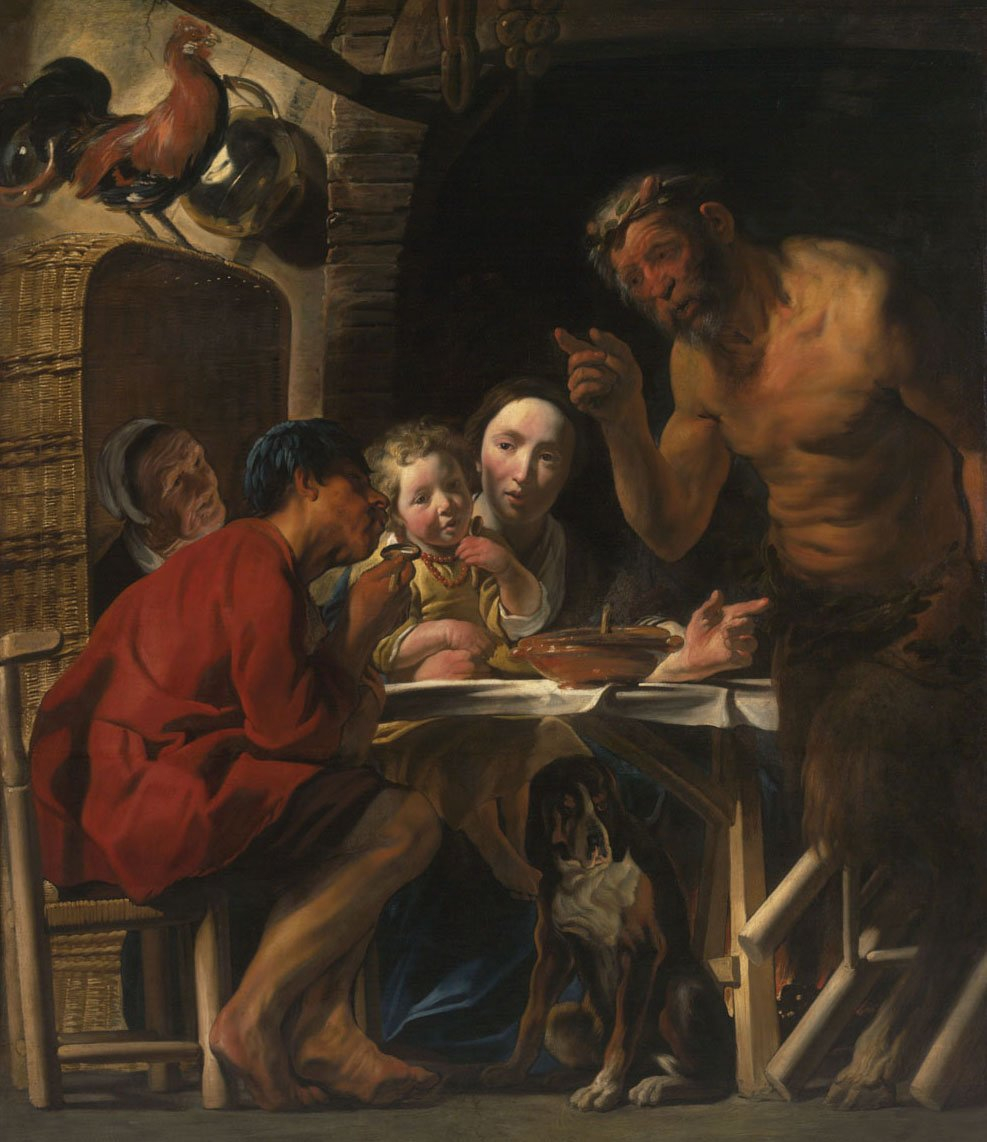
c. 1625,
Museum of Fine Arts, Budapest

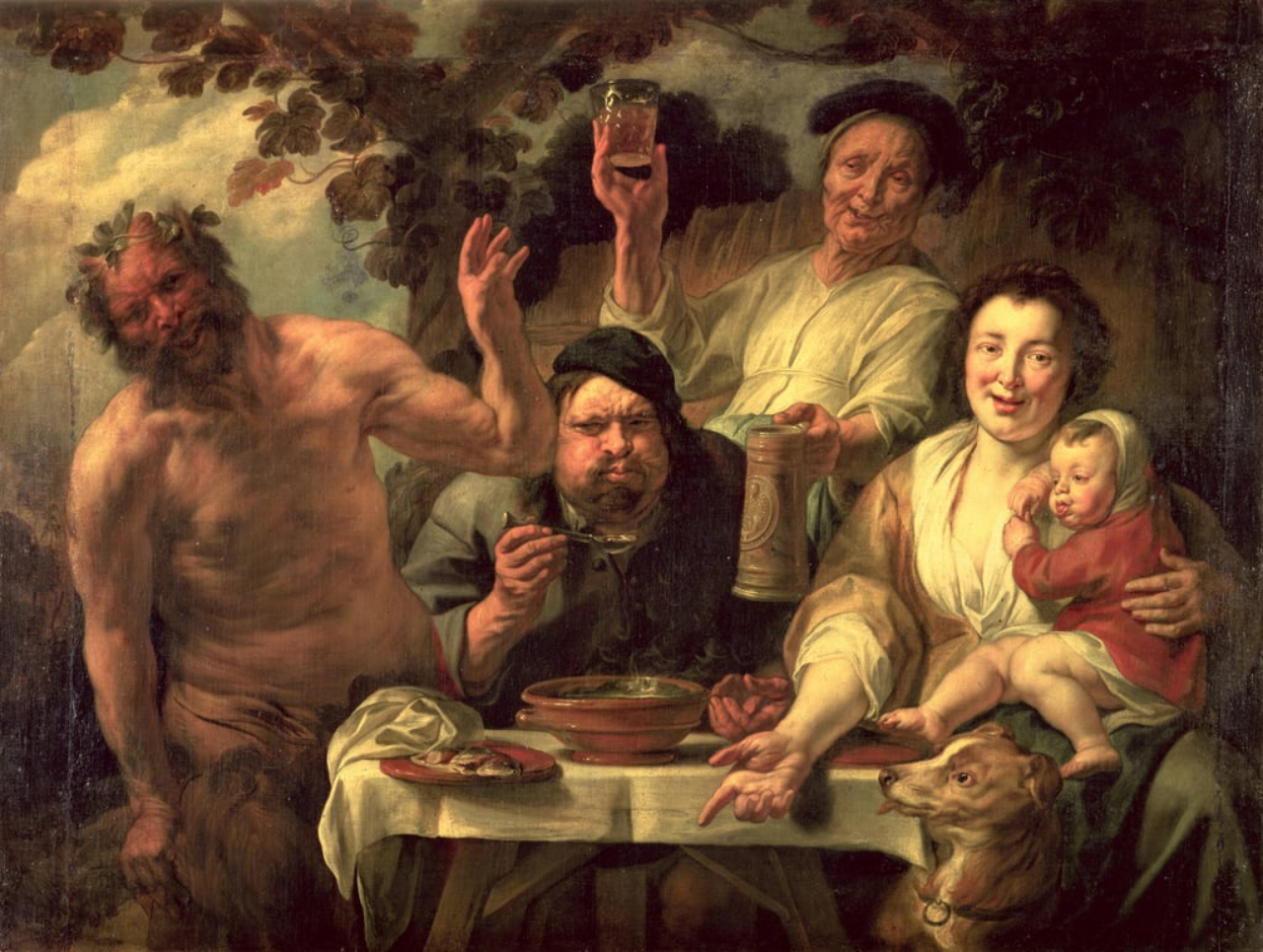
c. 1640/45,
Royal Museum of Fine Arts of Belgium, Brussels
