= Nekojita =

Japanese term for a person unable to eat or drink very hot things

Nekojita (Japanese: 猫舌, lit. 'cat tongue') is a Japanese term for someone who cannot take very hot food or drink, and for the sensitivity itself. Japanese dictionaries explain the name by the dislike cats show for hot food. The word has been in use since at least 1648, and in one survey more than half of Japanese respondents aged between 10 and 49 described themselves this way. How much heat a person can take in the mouth does vary widely: in one sensory study, the temperature at which participants judged coffee too hot to drink spanned 13 °C (23 °F) from the most to the least tolerant.

== Terminology and history ==
Digital Daijisen defines nekojita as "being unable to eat hot food; also, such a person", explaining the word as arising "from the fact that cats dislike hot food". The Nihon Kokugo Daijiten records the earliest attested use in Yama no i, a haikai collection of 1648. The older edition of Heibonsha's Sekai Dai-Hyakka Jiten (World Encyclopedia) records the word in an Edo period senryū, nekojita mo aru to yadotori nen o ire, on taking care over the lodging arrangements because some people have a cat's tongue—a sensitivity familiar enough to be worth planning around.

The Encyclopedia Nipponica notes that eating cooked food while it is still hot is peculiar to humans, and that sensitivity to hot food is not confined to cats; the cat serves simply as a familiar animal by which to name the trait.

Writing on Language Log, the Japanese-studies scholar Nathan Hopson places nekojita among other Japanese terms that treat a bodily sensitivity as a kind of person, such as hieshō (冷え性, a chronic sensation of cold, particularly in the lower body) and atsugari and samugari (people who feel heat or cold readily). He cites a 2018 survey of 10,000 respondents in which a majority of those aged between 10 and 49 identified themselves as nekojita. The word has also produced a derived expression, nekojita no nagaburo (猫舌の長風呂, "a cat-tongue's long bath"), for a preference for soaking a long time in a cooler bath rather than briefly in a very hot one. Hopson notes examples of the term being used in Chinese, where it is identified as a borrowing from Japanese, while cautioning that its wider currency there is unclear.

== Research on heat tolerance ==
Tolerance for hot drinks varies substantially between individuals. In a German sensory study of 87 participants — conducted as part of a cancer risk assessment, not as research on nekojita — the temperature at which coffee was judged too hot to drink ranged from 58 to 71 °C (136 to 160 °F), and 24 of them (28%) found temperatures below 65 °C (149 °F) already too hot.

Explanations of nekojita in terms of the anatomy of the tongue—a thicker tongue, or a different density of nerves—are commonly offered, but the report of Takahara's work dismisses these as lacking a demonstrated basis. Taro Takahara, a radiologist at Tokai University, has offered an alternative. In a small study using cine magnetic resonance imaging of ten volunteers, half of them self-described nekojita, he reported that the others drew the tongue back as hot tea entered the mouth, pocketing the liquid behind the lower teeth so that the tip of the tongue—its least heat-tolerant part—never touched it, while the nekojita participants met the tea with the tip. On that basis he proposed that technique rather than physiology accounts for the sensation, and that it can be trained. The work appeared in the magazine Bunshun Online, and Hopson, summarising it, cautions that it "might also be pseudoscience". Against training oneself to drink hotter stands the association of habitually very hot drinks with oesophageal cancer.

== Cats and food temperature ==
The dictionaries' premise has been examined, though not at the temperatures a person would call very hot. A review of palatability research reports that cats reject food served below 15 °C (59 °F) or above 50 °C (122 °F), and prefer it at about the body temperature of live prey. In one trial, domestic cats over seven years old ate most at 37 °C (99 °F) and least at 6 °C (43 °F).

== See also ==
- Blowing on hot food
- Supertaster
- Thermal grill illusion
