= Motoyaki =

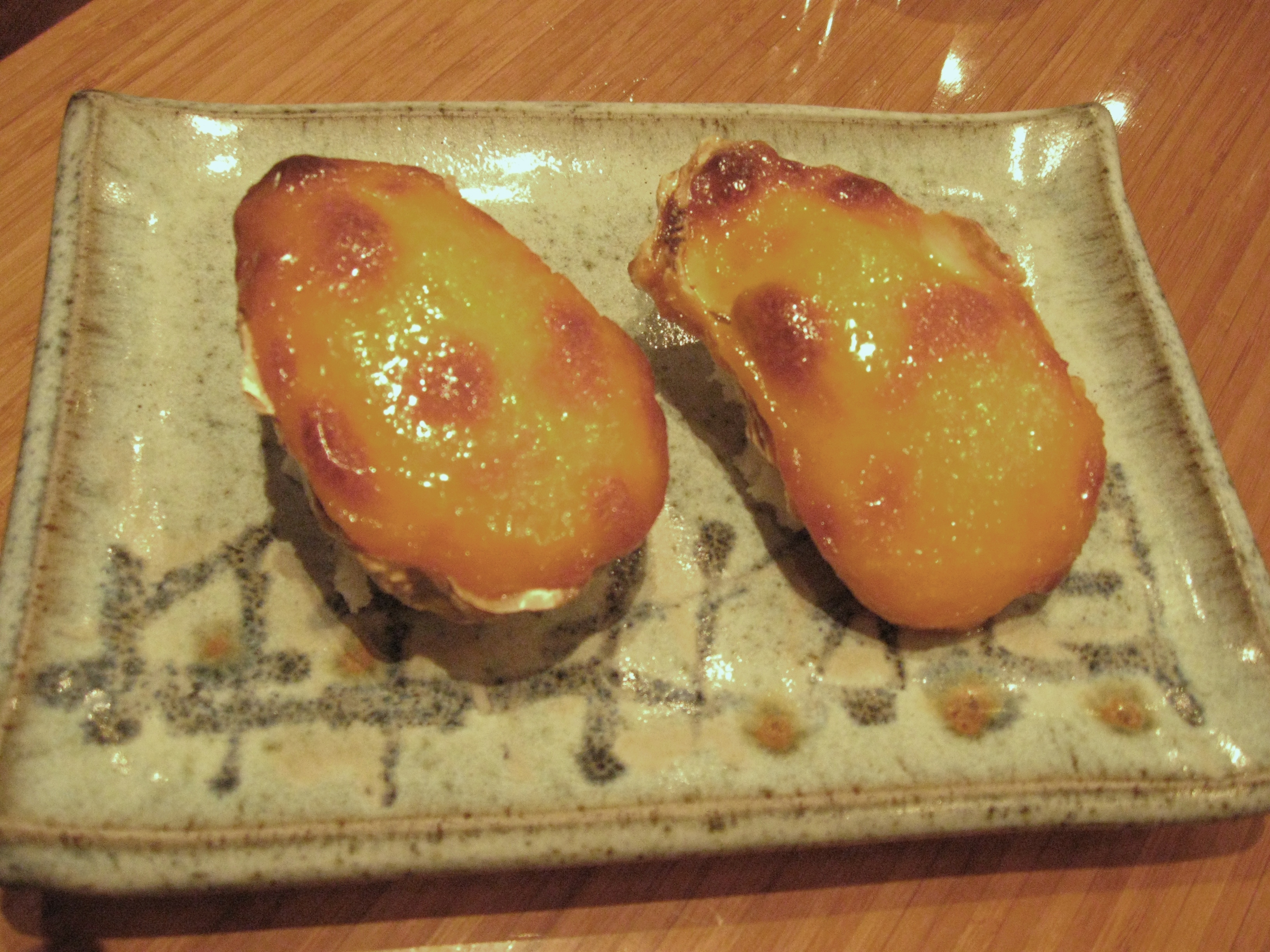
Oyster motoyaki

Motoyaki is a style of cooking, involving baked food topped with a mayonnaise-based sauce and served in an oyster shell. It is typically available in Japanese restaurants on the Pacific coast of Canada. Examples of motoyaki dishes are oyster motoyaki and lobster motoyaki.

== In Japan ==
In Japanese cuisine, a sauce called tamagonomoto (卵の素, literally:basis of egg) (Note: The sauce is egg-based, but its name means the opposite: "egg's base".) (or tamagonomoto (玉子の素) / tamamoto (玉素)) is prepared by beating egg yolks and oil together just like mayonnaise, but without any vinegar. Some variants also have miso or soy sauce added. Foods topped with this sauce and baked are moto-yaki (もと焼き) (Note: The first letters "も" and "と" both have Japanese particles using the same letters, a potential cause of confusion.) (or tamamoto-yaki (玉素焼き, literally:tamamotoed-and-baked) / moto-yaki (素焼き) (Note: The same kanji spelling has two other homonyms, even within the context of food related words, a potential cause of confusion: す‐やき【素焼】. Nihon Kokugo Daijiten, Concise edition (in Japanese). Japan: Shogakukan – via Kotobank.: 1. 素焼き(すやき, suyaki): unglazed earthenware; 2. 素焼き(すやき, suyaki): unseasoned baking)). Although motoyaki is considered a traditional Japanese dish, the names motoyaki, tamagonomoto, and alike are not well known in Japan as of 2021, while its variant using mayonnaise: mayonēzu-yaki (マヨネーズ焼き) (or mayo-yaki (マヨ焼き)) is far more popular.

Canadian motoyaki is similar to Japanese mayonēzuyaki in using mayonnaise, unlike Japanese "motoyaki".
