= Blowing on hot food =

Practice of directing breath across hot food or drink to cool it

A traveller blows on a steaming bowl to cool it, watched by his host, in Ernest Griset's 1869 illustration to the fable of The Satyr and the Traveller

Hot food or a hot drink may be blown on in order to cool it before it is consumed. The moving air speeds cooling mainly by replacing the warm, humid air resting on the surface with drier air, which allows evaporation to continue and to carry away latent heat; the effect is strongest on liquids and moist foods.

That one breath can both warm cold hands and cool hot food has been remarked on since antiquity. An Aesopic fable is predicated on the contrast: a satyr, watching his guest blow first on his fingers and then on his food, takes fright at a mouth that gives out both hot and cold. The English idiom "to blow hot and cold" descends from the story, while Plutarch treats the same pairing as a question about the nature of air.

The action is also the subject of rules of table manners, which have often discouraged it, and of research on how carers feed small children. In parts of West Asia and Eastern Europe, the practice is tolerated, and integrated within folklore. Here, blowing on cold or lukewarm food is a metaphor for unnecessarily cautious (or simply prudent) behaviour.

== Cooling mechanism ==
Blowing does two things at once. Moving air draws heat from the surface faster than still air can, because it keeps replacing the air in contact with the food with cooler air—forced convection. It also keeps evaporation going, and that is the larger effect. The air resting on a hot liquid is warm and close to saturated with water vapour, which holds evaporation back; sweeping it away puts drier air in its place, so molecules continue to leave the surface. Because the molecules that escape carry away more than the average energy, what stays behind is cooler. Hence, in Richard Feynman's summary, "blow on soup to cool it".

Because the effect rests chiefly on evaporation, the chemist Robert L. Wolke notes that blowing "works best with liquids, or at least with wet foods", and does comparatively little for a dry solid.

The contrast between warming and cooling breath was itself an object of explanation long before the modern account. Plutarch, in On the Principle of Cold, raises the proverbial man who blew both hot and cold, and reports that Anaximenes found no contradiction in it, explaining the difference by the density of the air: breath "grows cold when it is compressed and condensed by the lips", and turns hot "through rarefaction" when it leaves a slack mouth.

== Etiquette and custom ==
Rules against blowing on food are not confined to a single tradition. In Muriel Thayer Painter's ethnography of the Yoeme (Yaqui) of Pascua Village in Tucson, Arizona, a deer hunter "must not blow on his food but let it cool, or his luck will change"; one informant confined the rule to hunting with a bow and arrow, and compared it to the conduct of the hitebi, or curer, who waits for medicine to cool instead of blowing on it. David Delgado Shorter records the same prohibition among Yoeme hunting norms in Mexico.

=== English and American etiquette ===
Late medieval English courtesy books repeatedly forbid the practice. The Boke of Curtasye, preserved in Sloane MS 1986, instructs the reader "Ne blow not on þy drynke ne mete, / Neþer for colde, neþer for hete" – do not blow on your drink or food, neither for cold nor for heat. The Lytylle Childrenes Lytil Boke likewise tells the child not to blow on the food, and John Lydgate's Stans Puer ad Mensam ("the boy standing at table") applies the rule to drink as well: "be wele ware thow blow nat in the cuppe" – take good care that you do not blow into the cup.

Modern etiquette writers differ on how absolute the rule is. The Emily Post Institute presents quiet blowing on a spoonful as an acceptable alternative to slurping at ordinary meals, recommending "gently and quietly blowing on the soup in the spoon"; at a very formal meal, however, it advises neither blowing nor slurping, and suggests letting a filled spoon stand above the bowl for half a minute instead. Judith Martin, writing as Miss Manners, rejects the practice outright, holding that "blowing on the soup is, if anything, worse than stirring it" and recommending that a filled spoon simply be held while conversation continues.

=== Islamic religious literature ===
Some Islamic religious and etiquette texts discourage the practice, and hadith collections treat it as a topic in its own right: the Sunan ibn Majah devotes a chapter to it, headed bāb al-nafkh fī al-ṭaʿām ("Blowing on food"), which reports on the authority of Ibn ʿAbbās that Muhammad "never blew onto his food or drink, and he did not breathe into the vessel". The prohibition is restated in the eleventh book of al-Ghazālī's The Revival of the Religious Sciences (Iḥyāʾ ʿulūm al-dīn), the Kitāb ādāb al-akl or Book of the Manners Relating to Eating, which states that "one must not blow on hot food. This is prohibited", directing the reader to wait until it is comfortable to eat. Modern scholarship has examined the rule as part of Sufi adab, the discipline of proper conduct in everyday life: Eyad Abuali counts abstention from blowing on hot food among the observances through which an ordinary meal could be made religiously significant.

The rule is not uniformly observed. A survey of about 200 Islamic secondary-school and university students in Kuantan, Malaysia, found blowing on hot food to be among the most common departures from sunnah table practice, reported by 35% of respondents.

== Infant and child feeding ==
Nursing woman eating hot soup, in Honoré Daumier's drawing La soupe

Research into how infections travel from carers to small children has identified blowing on a child's food as one of several practices that can transfer an adult's saliva to the child, alongside premastication and tasting the food before handing it over. In a cohort study of children in Zambia, caregiver blowing was associated with seroconversion to human herpesvirus 8 when age and sex were taken into account, but the association did not reach statistical significance once the household's other food- and drink-sharing practices were included, and fewer than one household in ten reported the practice at all.

A qualitative study of infant feeding in rural south-western Uganda found blowing to be one of several methods caregivers described for cooling food and drink quickly, alongside spreading food out with a utensil and pouring liquid from one cup to another; one respondent described crushing food with the fingers, blowing on it, and sometimes tasting it to confirm it had cooled enough.

== Fables, idioms, proverbs ==
The practice is the hinge of a fable attributed to Aesop, numbered 35 in the Perry Index and known in English as "The Man and the Satyr" or The Satyr and the Traveller. A traveller blows on his fingers to warm them and then blows on scaldingly hot food to cool it; the satyr, appalled that the same mouth can emit both heat and cold, breaks off the friendship. The versions disagree about what is too hot to take—in the Greek the man says he is blowing "to cool the food, since it is too hot", while in the Latin retelling by Avianus it is a bowl of warmed wine—but the reversal that offends the satyr is the same either way. The fable is the source of the English idiom "to blow hot and cold", used of inconsistent or duplicitous behaviour.

Japanese has a verb used specifically for cooling something by blowing on it. Fukisamasu (吹き冷ます) is glossed in Digital Daijisen as "to cool by breathing on", the dictionary's example being the cooling of hot rice porridge (粥, kayu); the Nihon Kokugo Daijiten defines it more broadly as making a thing cold by blowing and cites the thirteenth-century glossary Myōgoki (1275) for the word. The mimetic adverb fūfū (ふうふう) describes repeated blowing with pursed lips, which Digital Daijisen illustrates with the phrase "eating hot soba while blowing on it".

The activity is mentioned in a Russian proverb: Обжегшиcь на молоке, дуют и на воду ("One who's been burned with milk blows even on water"). It conveys the image of "[one] who takes excessive care, fearing that the old troubles will recur". Variants of this expression exist in other Slavic languages: Polish has Kto się /raz/ na gorącym sparzy na zimne dmucha ("The one who is once burned on hot, blows on cold"), while Bulgarian uses Парен каша духа ("The one who is burned, blows on porridge").

Some Eastern European areas formerly dominated by the Ottoman Empire have preserved variants that specifically mention yogurt (or ayran) as the ready-to-consume liquid, in line with a Turkish phrase: Sütten ağzı yanan yoğurdu üfleyerek yer ("He whose mouth is burned by milk eats yogurt by blowing on it"). A modified version exists in Kurmanji, as: Tu ji girarê tirsiyayî, pifê dew jî dikî ("Since you got scared of the hot soup, you blow even on the cold ayran"). In Serbo-Croatian, the corresponding proverb is Ko se jednom na mleko opeče, taj i u jogurt duva, with the exact same translation as the Turkish. It replaces an older variant, Ko se jedan put ožeže, i na hladno puše ("He who burns himself once blows even on the cold"); according to researcher Vuk Karadžić, the original echoes a folk story in which "an Albanian man burned himself on a roasted pumpkin (which he had never seen before) and, when he saw it a second time in a bush in the field, blew on it from over the fence."

In non-Slavic Romanian, Cine s-a fript cu ciorbă suflă și în iaurt ("Whoever has burned themselves on chorba will blow even on yogurt") is rather equivalent to "once bitten, twice shy". It is used as such as the title and moral to a mock-fable by George Topîrceanu: a shopkeeper gets angry when his wife shares a kiss with her brother; he explains to the latter that he had been "burned" (cuckolded) in the past, and was playing it safe. In this standardized form, the proverb is highly recognised and circulated; earlier versions use "borscht" or "porridge" instead of chorba. In the Wallachian dialect, it once competed with a non-culinary variant: Cine e morsicat [sic] de șarpe, se ferește și de șopârlă ("One who was bitten by a snake will grow to fear lizards").

== See also ==
- Nekojita
