= Premastication =

Pre-chewing of food

Premastication, pre-chewing, or kiss feeding is the act of chewing food for the purpose of physically breaking it down in order to feed another that is incapable of masticating the food by themselves. This is often done by the mother or relatives of a baby to produce baby food capable of being consumed by the child during the weaning process. The chewed food in the form of a bolus is transferred from the mouth of one individual to another, either directly mouth-to-mouth, via utensils, hands, or is further cooked or processed prior to feeding.

The behaviour was common throughout human history and societies and observed in non-human animals. While premastication is less common in present-day Western societies, it was commonly practised before, and is still done in more traditional cultures. Although the health benefits of premastication are still being actively studied, the practice appears to confer certain nutritional and immunological benefits to the infant, provided that the caretaker is in good health and not infected by pathogens.

== Behavioural roots ==
Premastication and mouth-to-mouth feeding in humans is postulated to have evolved from the regurgitation of food from parent to offspring or male to female (courtship feeding) and has been observed in numerous mammals and animals of other species, including predatory social insects. For instance, food begging behaviour observed in young wolves, wild dogs and certain gull species, which involves the young approaching the beak or mouth of the adult with their own whereupon gaping their mouths or nuzzling, the adult would regurgitate portions of food to feed the young. However, in the aforementioned animals, this nuzzling behaviour and other types of mouth-to-mouth contact are also used for bonding, socialization, and courtship.

=== In apes ===
Young orangutans also beg for food by such contact and accordingly their caretakers regurgitate to feed them. Indeed, behaviours of mouth to mouth feeding of premasticated food and ritualized mouth to mouth contact for bonding has been observed in anthropoid apes such as gorillas, orangutans and chimpanzees. All of this supports the idea that human behaviours of kissing and feeding of premastication foods, either directly or indirectly from the mouth, have their behavioural roots in higher animals and ancestral great apes.

=== Human kiss precursor ===
There is high similarity in the execution of kiss-feeding and human kisses (e.g. French kiss); in the former, the tongue is used to push food from mother to child with the child receiving both the mother's food and tongue in sucking movements, and the latter simply forgoes the premasticated food. In fact, observations across various species and cultures confirms that the act of kissing and premastication have most likely evolved from the similar relationship-based feeding behaviours.

== History and culture ==
Written records of premastication have been found in Ancient Egypt, though the practice likely extends back into prehistoric times to non-human ancestors. For instance, in the Ancient Egyptian Ebers medical papyrus, a mother was instructed to give a medical remedy to a child through premastication. In the fifth century A.D. Roman culture, premastication of infants' food by caretakers was also common, though the lack of sanitation along with the practice contributed to infant mortality. Infants in Medieval Europe were fed an assortment of mashed, premasticated food or bread softened with liquids.

Due to attitudes in Western medicine in the 1940s and 1950s, Native American and Fijian cultures and societies were strongly dissuaded from premastication due to concerns about the hygiene of the practice. However, the lack of knowledge regarding premastication and its prohibition by missionaries and doctors instead caused severe anemia in the infants of the population, or resulted in malnourished infants and children deprived of nourishment.

Although less prevalent in modern post-industrial Western societies, the offering of premasticated foods to infants is found in many traditional cultures and offers their infants numerous benefits. In North America, premastication is still commonly used by Black and Hispanic mothers, and commonly used by women of Inuit and Aleut peoples.

In many human cultures, the act of premastication and direct mouth-to-mouth feeding is linked with the showing of affection, known as kiss feeding. In the Manus cultures of the Admiralty Islands, the act of premastication has been used by women to remind children and descendants of their obligations to her. Some human cultures such as the people of Papua New Guinea in fact use mouth to mouth contact primarily for feeding premasticated food, with sexual kissing only observed after the arrival of Europeans. This form of feeding is believed to have evolved into the modern human acts of kissing and French kissing.

Many Western societies have strong aversions toward premastication, which have been compared to their similar criticisms and aversion towards breastfeeding in previous generations for similar rationale, with the same societies finding breastfeeding to be a disagreeable practice performed only by the uneducated lower classes or foreign cultures and altering health policies to the detriment of infant health. In the late 1800s the medical community of Texas was embroiled in a debate on premastication, with those supporting the practice arguing its benefits and those against it stating that it is "filthy and repulsive and... barbaric".

== Health ==
The act of premastication is commonly found in all human societies and populations, although it is less prevalent in some than others. The evolution and selective advantage of premastication behaviours is that it supplements the infant diet of breast milk by providing access to more macro- and micro-nutrients, as well as digestive enzymes. Although disease can be transmitted through saliva in the pre-chewed foods, the benefits conferred outweighed any risks of the practice during the evolution of human behaviour. Furthermore, discouraging premastication as prevention to disease transmission may prove as disastrous an infant public health policy as when infants breastfeeding was discouraged in the late 1980s and early 1990s. In populations with healthy caregivers, premastication is not correlated with negative health consequences, with potential benefits and pitfalls of this practice greatly depend on the dietary and medical circumstances of the provider and child.

The true scope of the benefits of premastication and its prevalence in different societies is still under research, though there appears to be some consensus on the nutritional benefits of the practice. As a comorbidity with caretaker health and education, as well as societal access to proper healthcare and nutrition, the impacts of premastication on child health requires further studies and trials prior to the introduction of policies encouraging or dissuading its practice.

== See also ==
- Baby food
- Blowing on hot food
- Breastfeeding
- Hygiene hypothesis
- Kiss
