= The Satyr and the Traveller =

One of Aesop's Fables

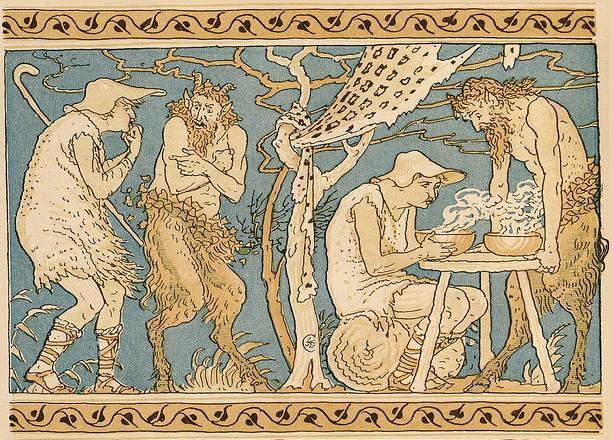
The Satyr and the Traveller, illustrated by Walter Crane, 1887

The Satyr and the Traveller (or Peasant) is one of Aesop's Fables and is numbered 35 in the Perry Index. The popular idiom 'to blow hot and cold' is associated with it and the fable is read as a warning against duplicity.

== The Fable ==
There are Greek versions and a late Latin version of the fable by Avianus. In its usual form, a satyr or faun comes across a traveller wandering in the forest in deep winter. Taking pity on him, the satyr invites him home. When the man blows on his fingers, the satyr asks him what he is doing and is impressed when told that he can warm them that way. But when the man blows on his soup and tells the satyr that this is to cool it, the honest woodland creature is appalled at such double dealing and drives the traveller from his cave. There is an alternative version in which a friendship between the two is ended by this behaviour.

The idiom 'to blow hot and cold (with the same breath)' to which the fable alludes was recorded as Ex eodem ore calidum et frigidum efflare by Erasmus in his Adagia (730, 1.8.30). Its meaning was further defined by the emblem books of the Renaissance, particularly those that focused on fables as providing lessons for moral conduct. While Hieronymus Osius tells the tale of the traveller and draws the moral that one should avoid those who are inconstant, Gabriele Faerno puts it in the context of friendship and counsels that this should be avoided with the 'double-tongued' (bilingues). In this he is followed by Giovanni Maria Verdizotti, Marcus Gheeraerts the Elder and Geoffrey Whitney.

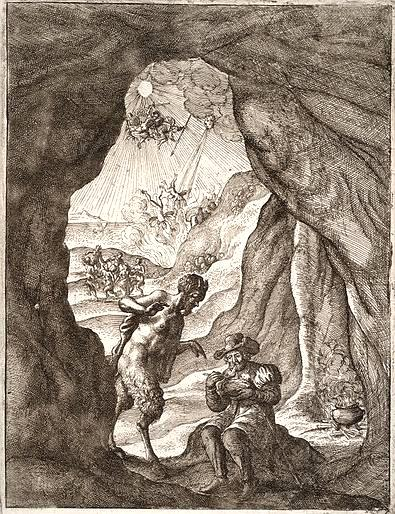
Wenceslas Hollar's "The Satyr and the Traveller" accompanying John Ogilby's paraphrase

However, in Francis Barlow's edition of the fables (1687), the Latin text warns against those whose heart and tongue do not accord, while Aphra Behn comments in English verse that "The sycophant with the same breath can praise/ Each faction and what's uppermost obeys", following John Ogilby's slightly earlier example of giving the story a political interpretation. But there is more nuance in Ogilby's narrative. He places the 'honest' race of satyrs among the infernal species, a point emphasised by the accompanying Wenceslas Hollar print that shows the battle in heaven and the fall of Lucifer as taking place outside the mouth of the cave in which the traveller is blowing on his broth. In this way the fable's interpretation is subtly redirected and its condemnation of the double-tongued turns into a sly stab at the Puritan vocabulary by the time the moral is reached:

Fiends and Saints convertible be, for where
We spy a Devil, some say a Saint goes there.

The fable was included as Le satyre et le passant among the fables of Jean de la Fontaine (V.7) but with no alteration of moral. However, this version too was to be reinterpreted in a political sense in the 19th century. In the course of his very free version, John Matthews expanded the text to comment on the 1819 election in Westminster and advise the voters to adopt the satyr's view of blowing hot and cold. In France the satirical cartoonist J.J. Grandville also updated the meaning by showing a group of loungers reading and commenting on the newspapers in a public park next to a statue illustrating the fable (see in Gallery 4 below).

The Age of Enlightenment had intervened and prominent thinkers had then attacked the logic of this fable in particular. In the article on "Fable" in his Dictionnaire Philosophique (1764), Voltaire remarked that the man was quite right in his method of warming his fingers and cooling his soup, and the satyr was a fool to take exception. The German philosopher Gotthold Ephraim Lessing asserts in one of his essays on fables that its fault 'lies not in the inaccuracy of the allegory, but that it is an allegory only', perhaps reaching towards the conclusion that the fable had been badly framed around an already existing proverb. 'The man ought really to have acted contradictorily; but in this fable he is only supposed to have done so.' By using the fable to focus on political behaviour, therefore, the writers and artists give it a justification not inherent within its narrative.

== Musical settings ==
During the 18th century new versions of fables were written to fit popular airs. "The Satyr and the Traveller" was set to the tune "I'll tell thee Dick where I have been" and was collected among 470 other songs in the English compilation titled The Lark (London 1740). But the poem itself, consisting of four six-line stanzas beginning "To his poor Cell a Satyr led/ A Traveller with Cold half dead", was originally written by Tom Brown near the turn of that century and appeared in the posthumous collection of his works. Thereafter the poem was reprinted in several other compilations for well over a century. It was later joined by a different musical version of the fable beginning "When chilling wind and snow clad tree/ Made Robin seek the Cottage door".

The same process of fitting new words to old tunes was also happening in France during the 18th century. There the most ambitious compilation was the Receuil de fables choisies dans le goût de M. de la Fontaine sur de petits airs et vaudevilles connus (Imitations of La Fontaine's fables set to popular airs, Paris 1746). In it is to be found the retitled "Le Satire et son Hôte", also comprising four six-line stanzas, subtitled "Duplicity" and sung to the air "Le fameux Diogene". In 1861 La Fontaine's own words were set to music by Pauline Thys as the second piece in her Six Fables de La Fontaine (1861), as well as by Théodore Ymbert in the previous year. Théophile Sourilas (1859-1907) made his setting for three voices in 1900.

== The fable in art ==
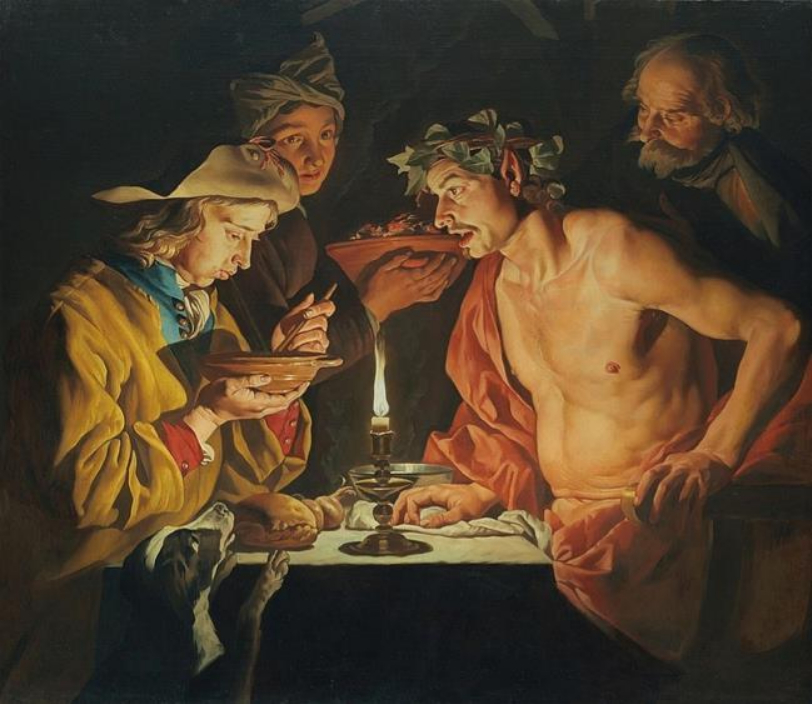
The satyr and the peasant, Matthias Stom, 1630s

For a variety of reasons the fable of "The Satyr and the Peasant" in particular became one of the most popular genre subjects in Europe and by some artists was painted in many versions. It was particularly popular in the Netherlands, where it brought together the contemporary taste for Classical mythology and a local liking for peasant subjects. At the start of the 17th century the poet Joost van den Vondel published his popular collection based on Marcus Gheeraerts' prints, Vorstelijke Warande der Dieren (Princely pleasure-ground of beasts, 1617), in which the poem Satyr en Boer appears. This seems to have appealed to the imagination of the young Jacob Jordaens, who went on to produce some dozen versions of the subject and did more than any other painter to popularise it. He was followed in his native Antwerp by others such as Willem van Herp, David Ryckaert the younger and Jan Cossiers, while in the Dutch Republic it was taken up by the group of Rembrandt's pupils and followers, Gerbrand van den Eeckhout, Barent Fabritius and Claes Corneliszoon Moeyaert, as well as by genre painters like Benjamin Gerritsz Cuyp and Jan Steen.

Although the Italians Faerno and Verdizotti were before them in literary treatments, the subject was applied to large-scale oil paintings by German and Netherlandish artists working in Italy like Johann Liss and Matthias Stom, and later taken up by Sebastiano Ricci and Gaspare Diziani. Since the southern Netherlands were then under Spanish rule and paintings from there found their way to Spain, the young Diego Velázquez also made the fable one of his subjects. French treatments were largely confined to La Fontaine's fable and include a work by Pierre Marie Gault de St Germain, painted for King Stanislas of Poland and exhibited in the 1790 Salon, and one by Jules Joseph Meynier (1826–1903), exhibited at the Salon of 1872 and purchased by the state. There was also an English treatment by E.H.Wehnert shown in 1833 at the exhibition of the New Society of Painters in Watercolours.

The scene of the fable depends on the version followed. The traveller is invited into the satyr's home, which is often shown as a cave – and is specified as such in La Fontaine's version. In early illustrations the guest may be shown, illogically, as being entertained outside the dwelling, rather than sheltering within it. During the 17th century, peasant interiors served as an opportunity to crowd the picture with small details and fill the space with animals and (where the theme is the friendship between satyr and man) members of the man's family. Alternatively, members of the satyr's family are shown where La Fontaine's fable is followed, culminating in the charming little satyrs who crowd round the traveller in Gustave Doré's illustration. The Netherlands painters also show a particular interest in light, especially those near in time to Caravaggio and the effects he achieved. Most often the light enters from the door, although in some paintings the source is more ambiguous and creates a dramatic effect as it picks out a group either at the centre or to one side of the painting. Where the main interest is in the moral of the fable, the picture space is unencumbered and serves only as an accompaniment to the story. But as interest shifts away from the story as such, detail and composition become the main focus and the fable is relegated to being the excuse for an exercise of the painterly art.

== Gallery 1: Fable and emblem collections ==
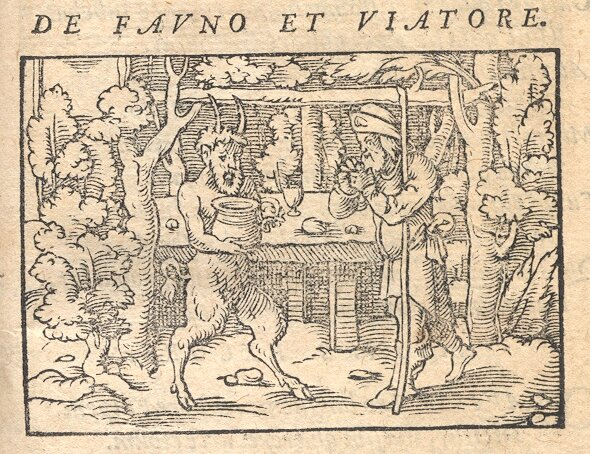
In Hieronymus Osius' Fabulae Aesopi, 1564

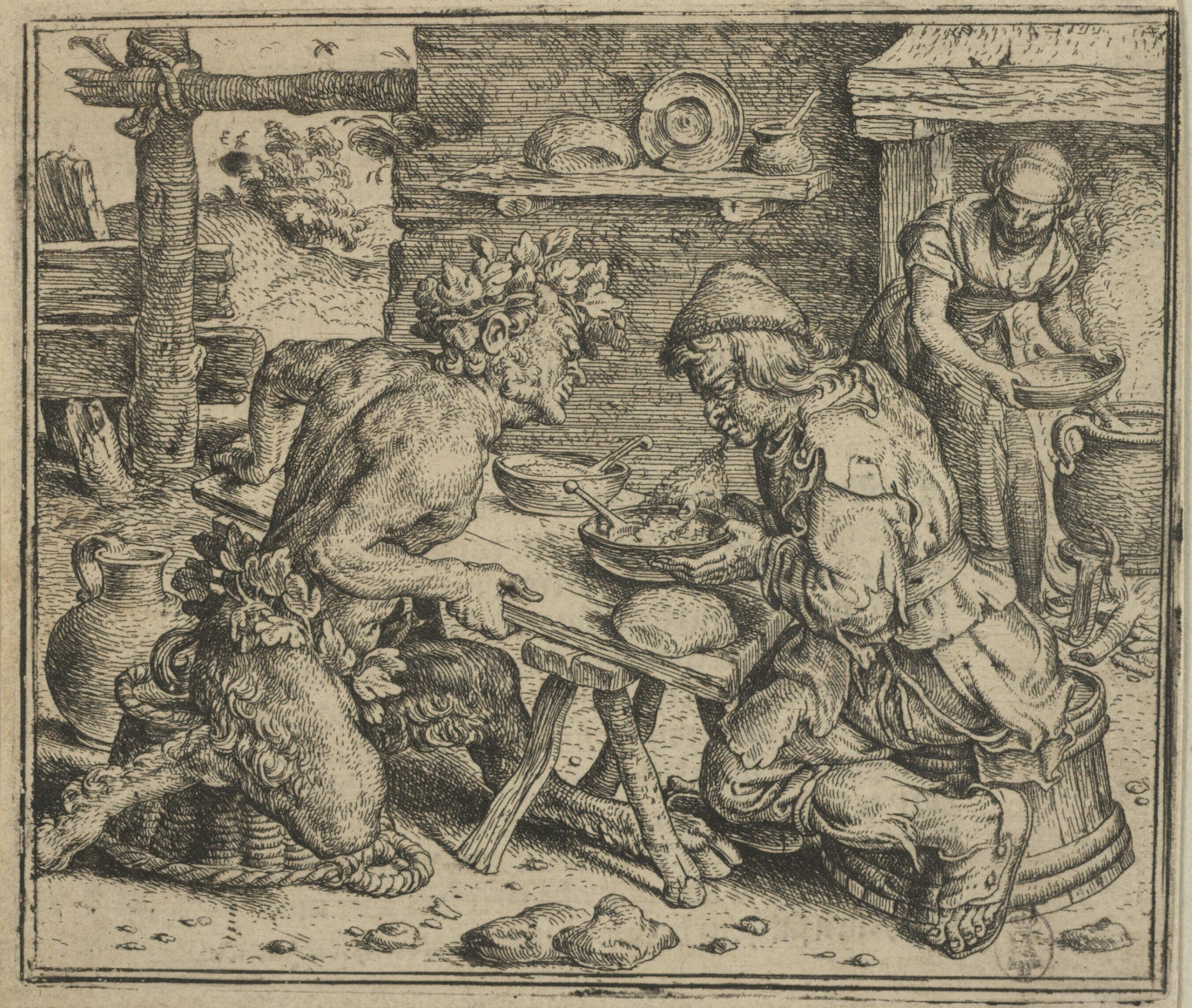
Print by Marcus Gheeraerts the Elder in De warachtighe fabulen der dieren, 1567

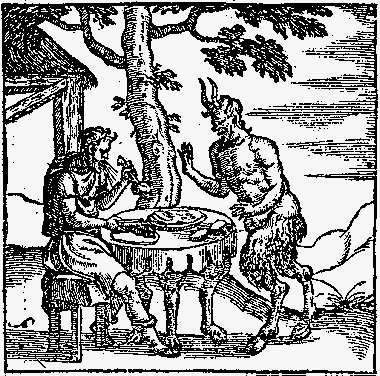
In Geoffrey Whitney's Choice of Emblemes, Leiden, 1586

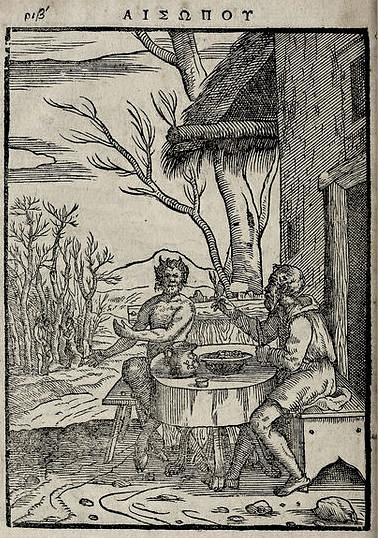
From Iohannis Patousas' edition of Aesop's Fables in Greek, Venice, 1644

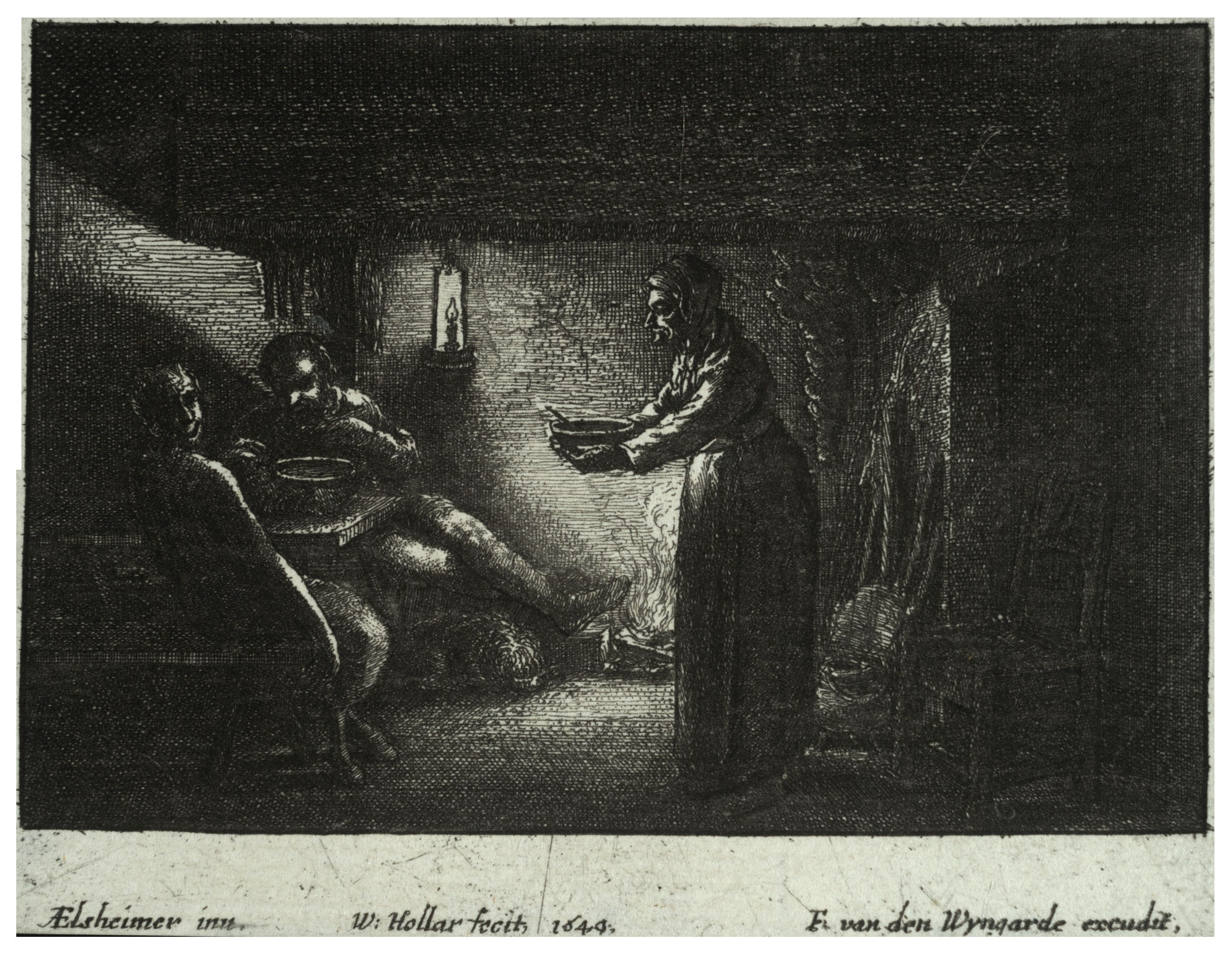
Engraving by Wenceslas Hollar after Adam Elsheimer, 1649

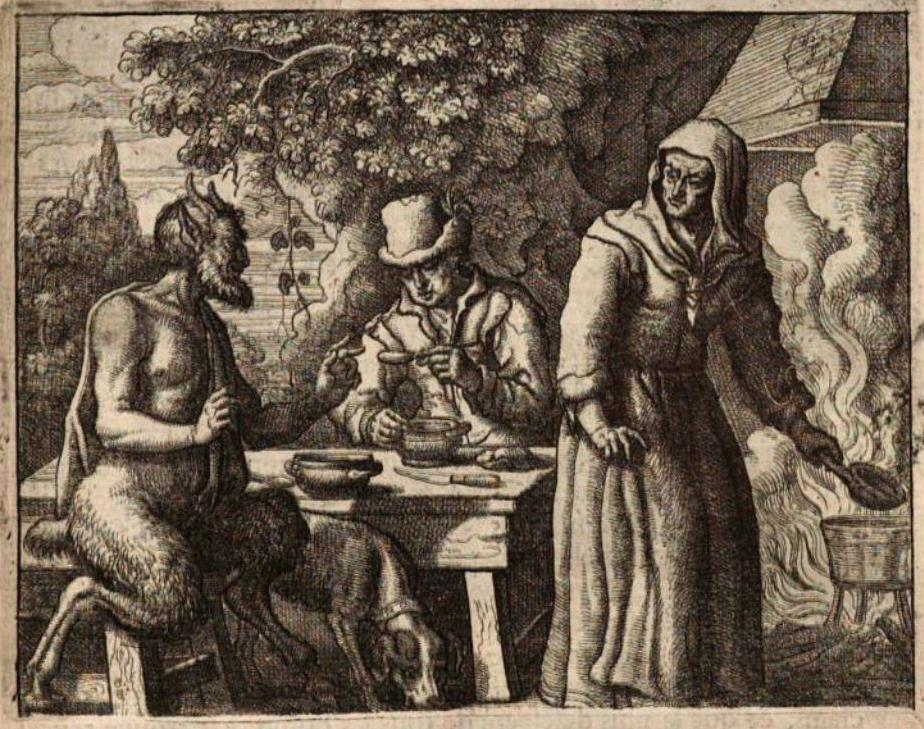
In Francis Barlow's edition of Aesop's Fables, 1687

== Gallery 2a:Paintings from the Southern Netherlands ==
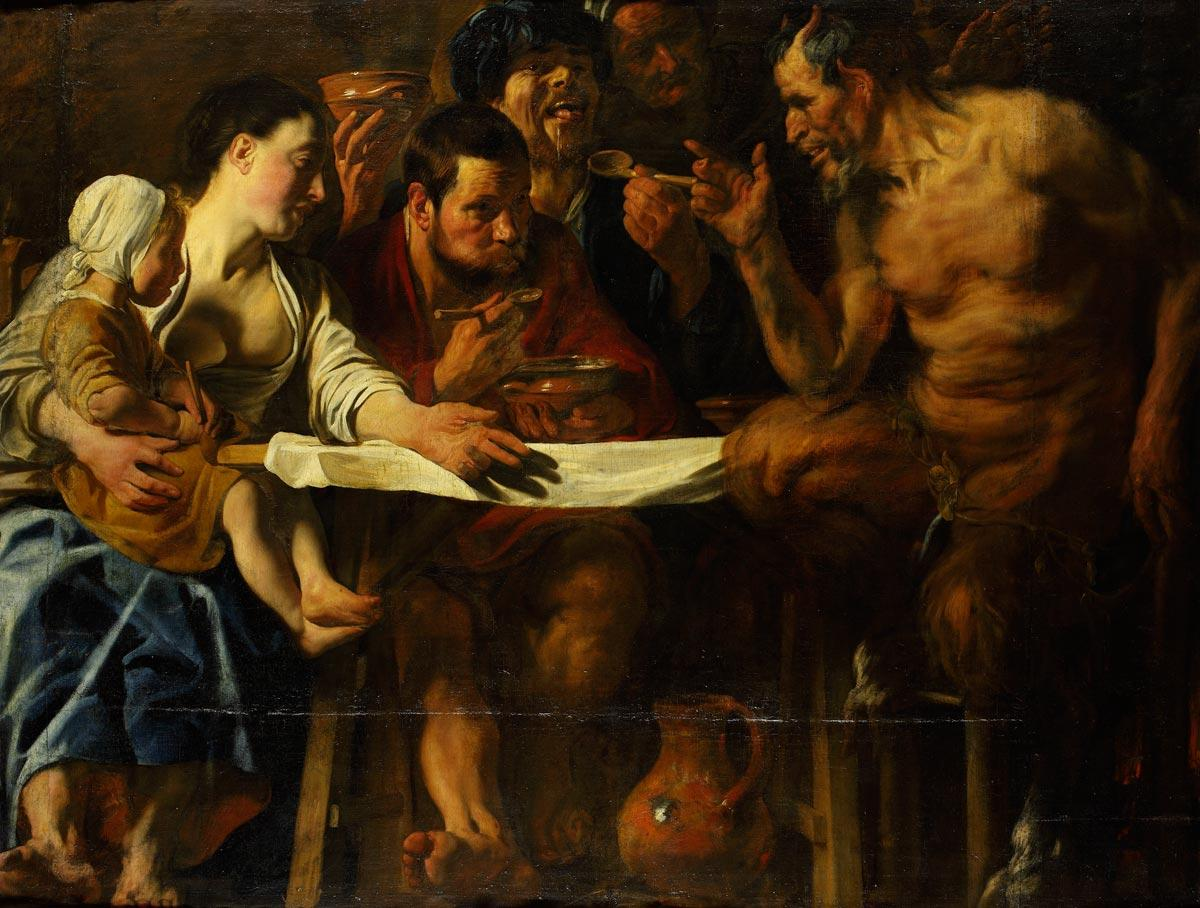
Jacob Jordaens, The Satyr and the Peasant, Pushkin Gallery, Moscow, 1620s

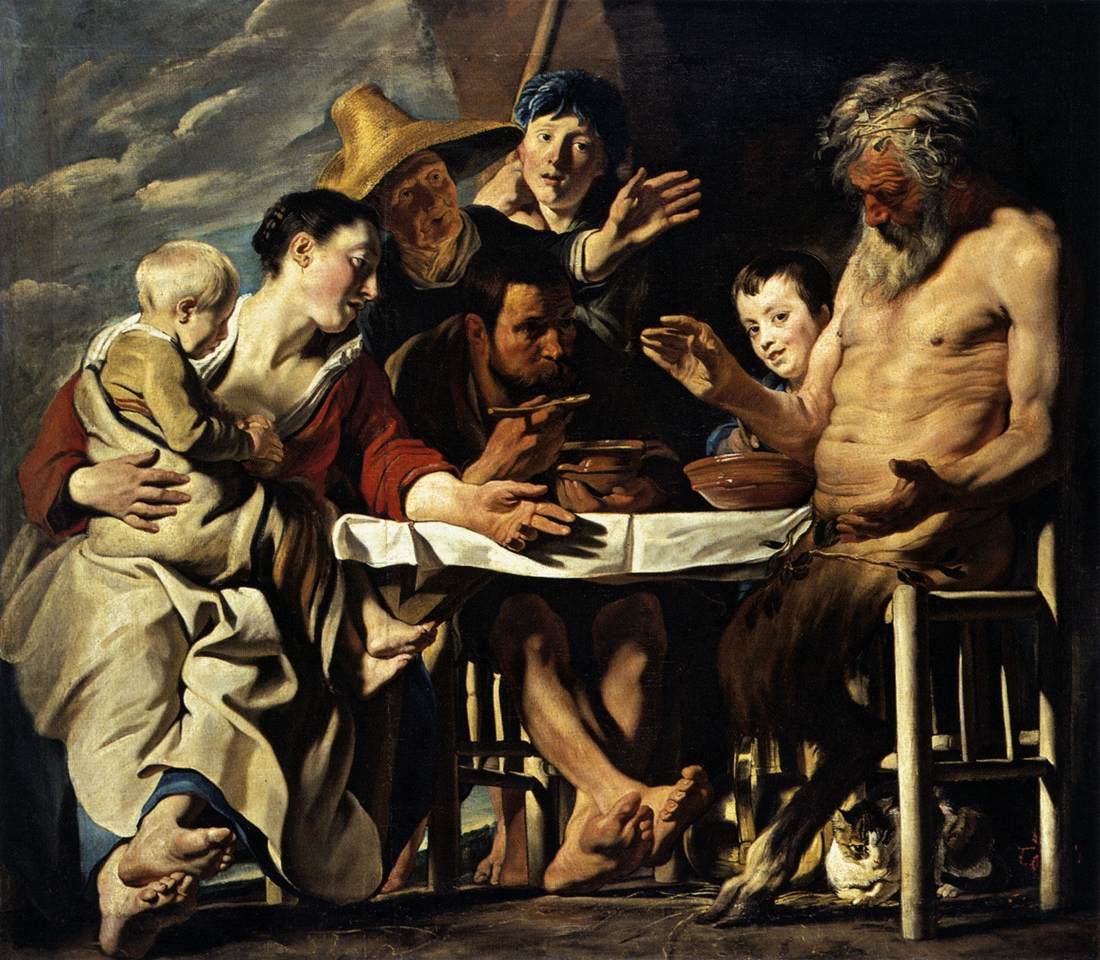
Jacob Jordaens, The Satyr and the Peasant, Staatliche Museen, Kassel, 1620s

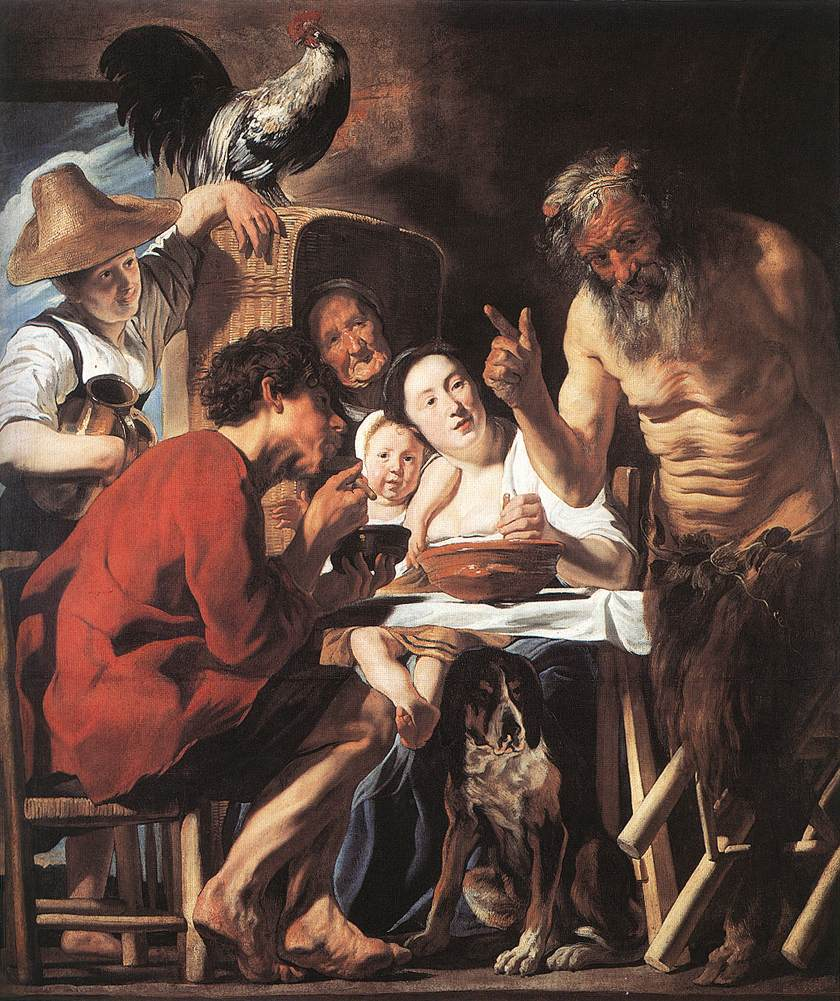
Jacob Jordaens, The Satyr and the Peasant, Royal Museums of Fine Arts of Belgium, Brussels

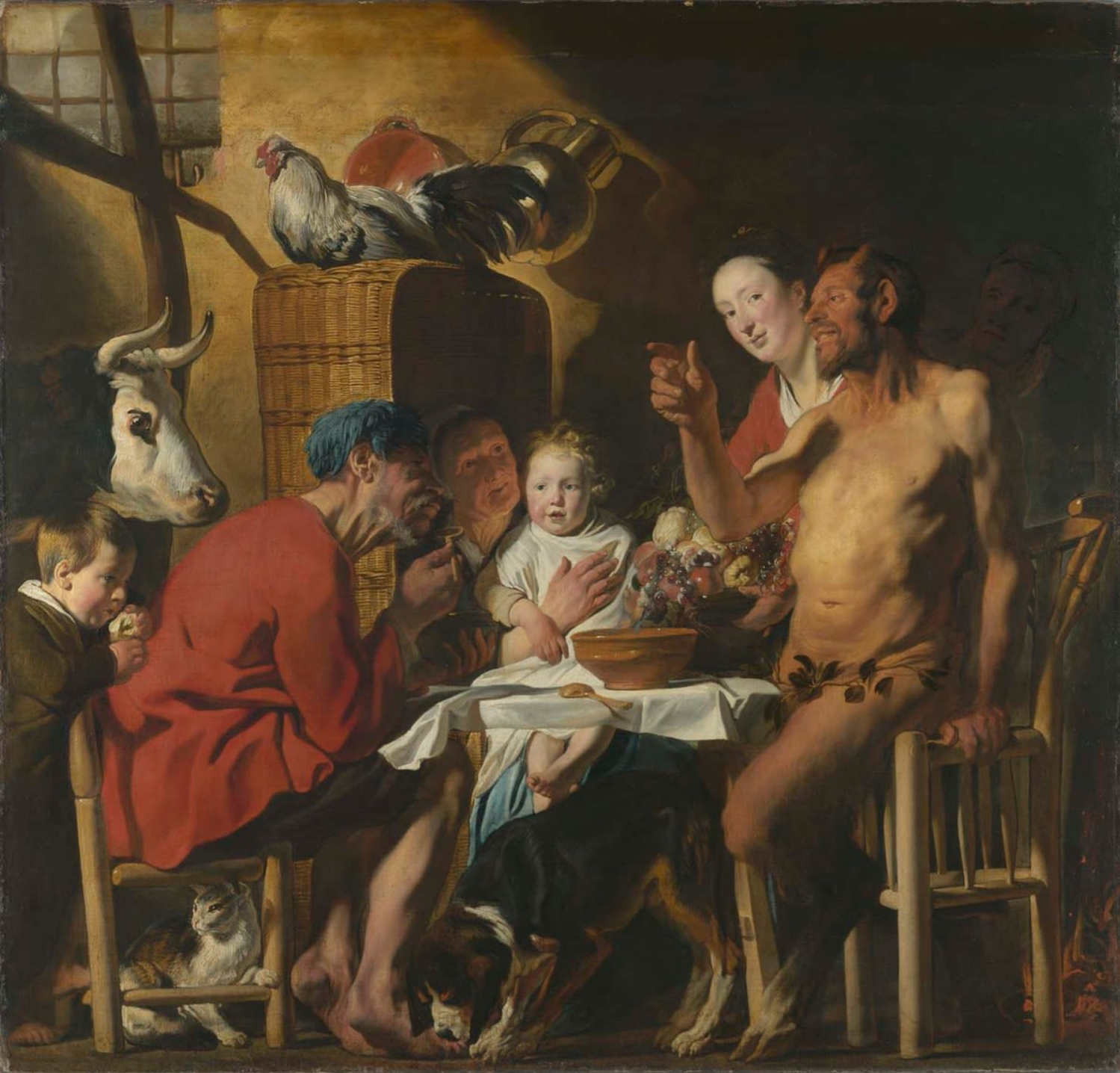
Jacob Jordaens, the laughing satyr variant

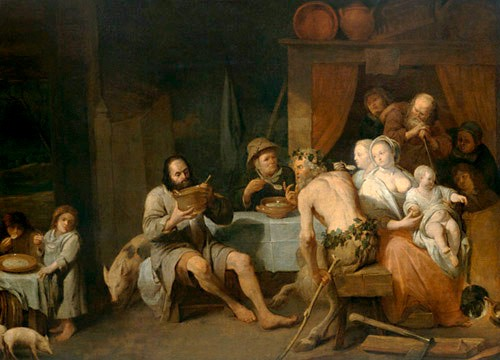
David Ryckaert the Younger, The Satyr and the Peasant

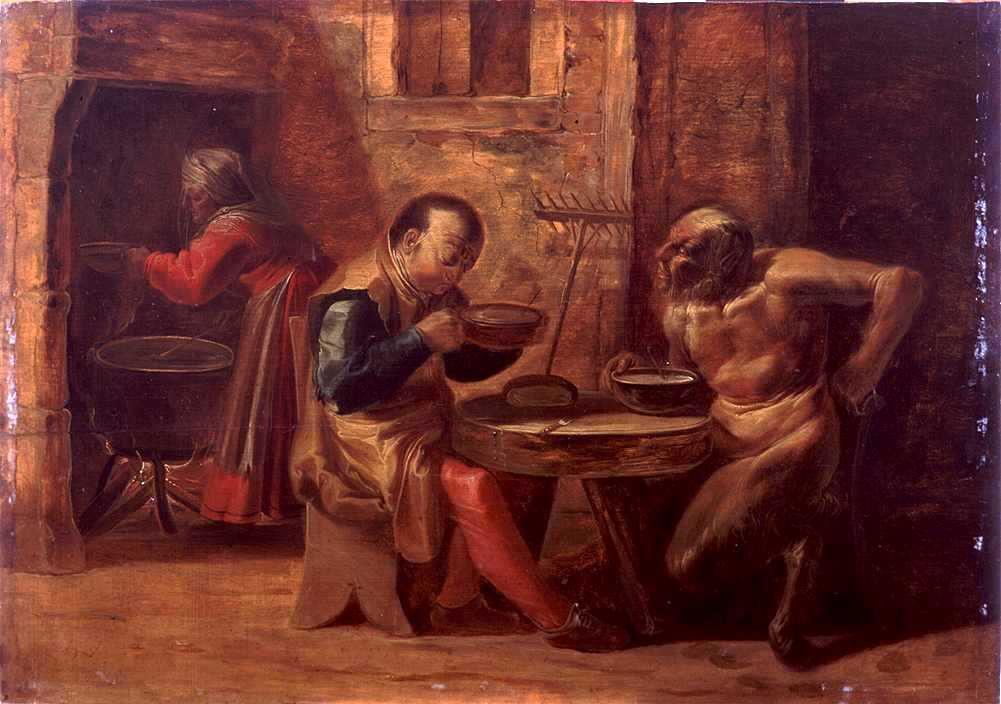
Jan van de Venne, The Satyr in the Peasant's House, Brukenthal National Museum, Sibiu Ro

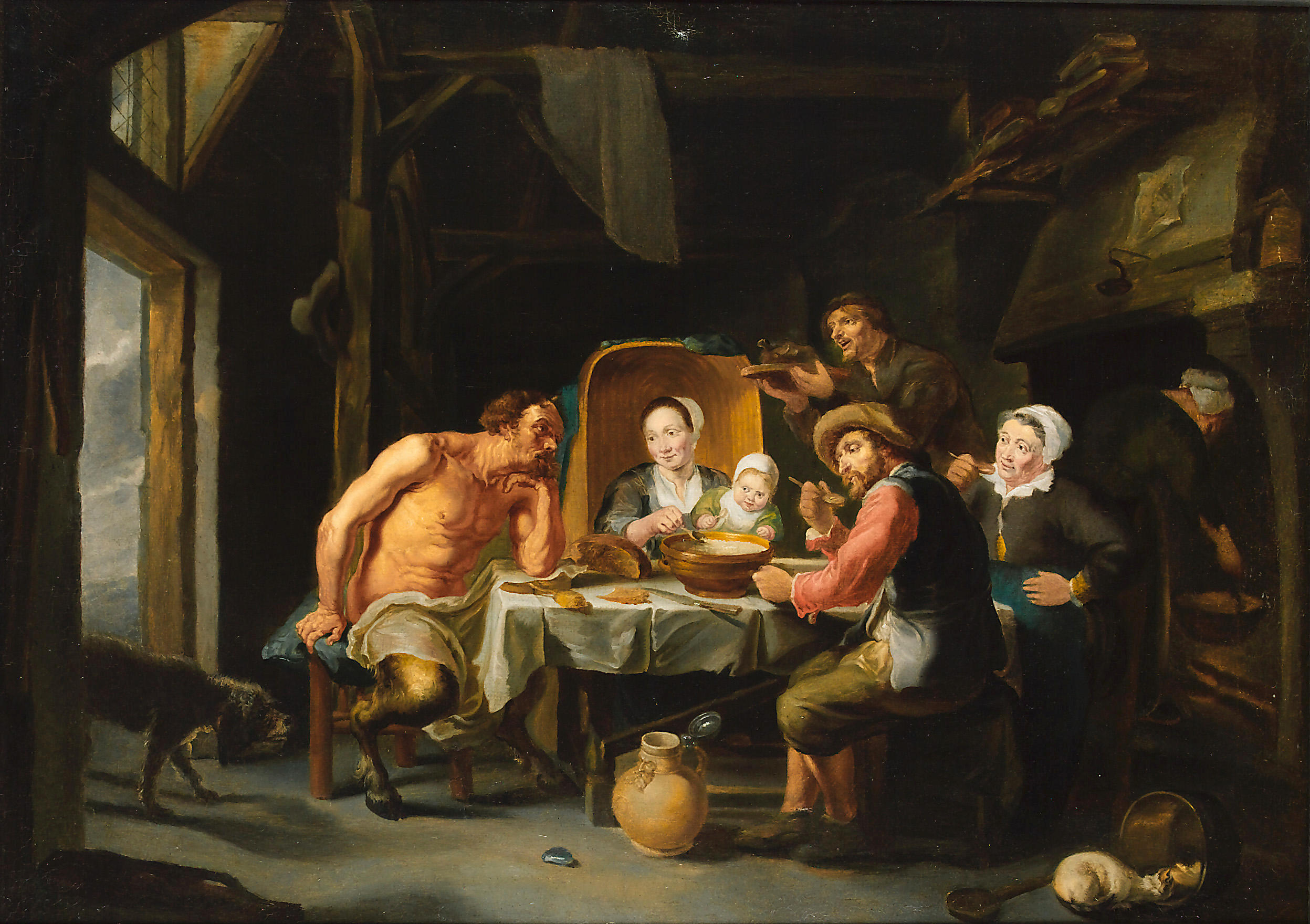
Willem van Herp, The Satyr and the Peasant,

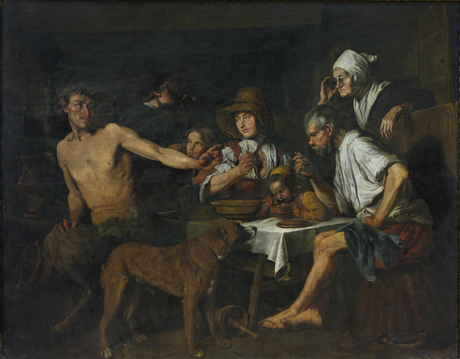
Jan Cossiers, The Satyr and the Peasant Family, National Gallery of Armenia, Yerevan

== Gallery 2b:Paintings from the Northern Netherlands ==
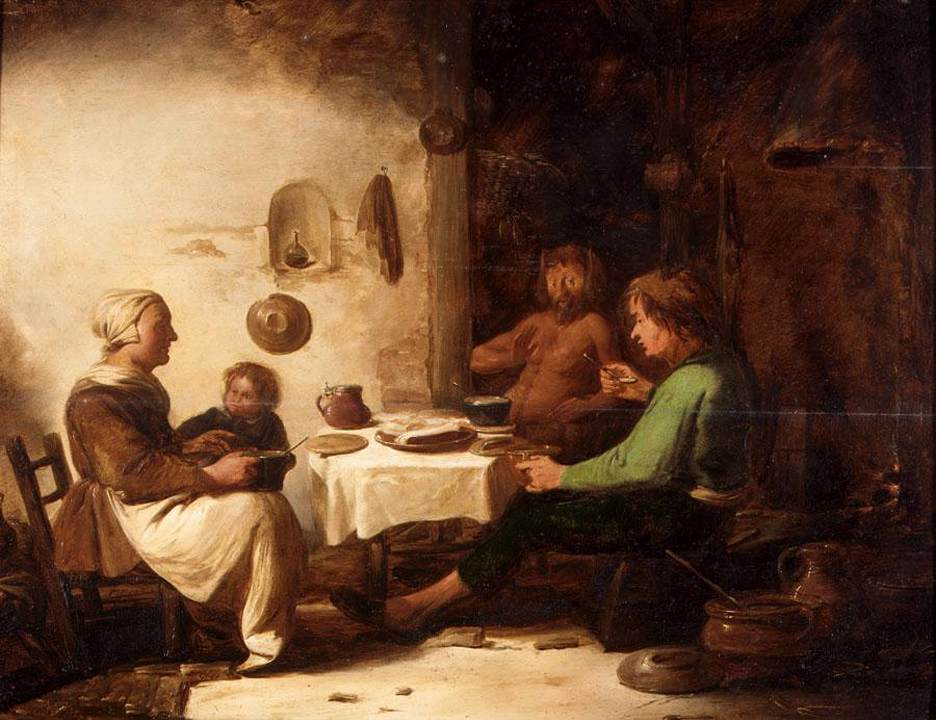
Benjamin Gerritsz Cuyp, The Satyr and the Peasant Family, first half of the 17th century

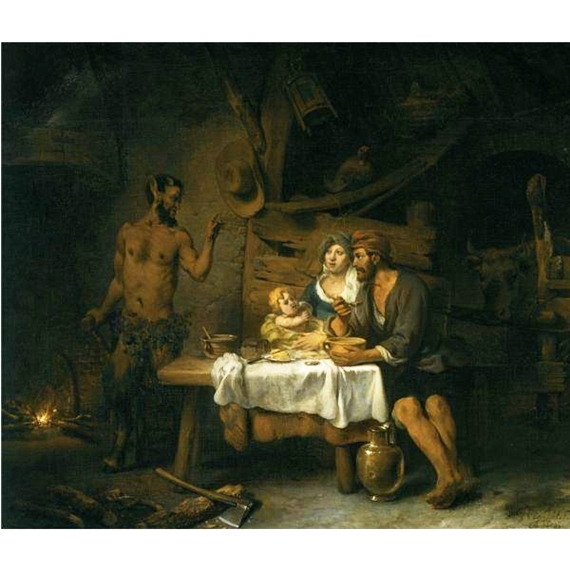
Gerbrand van den Eeckhout, The Satyr and the Peasant

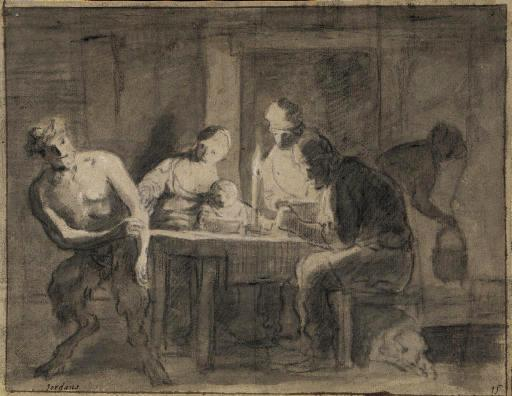
Moeyaert, a chalk drawing of The Satyr and the Peasant

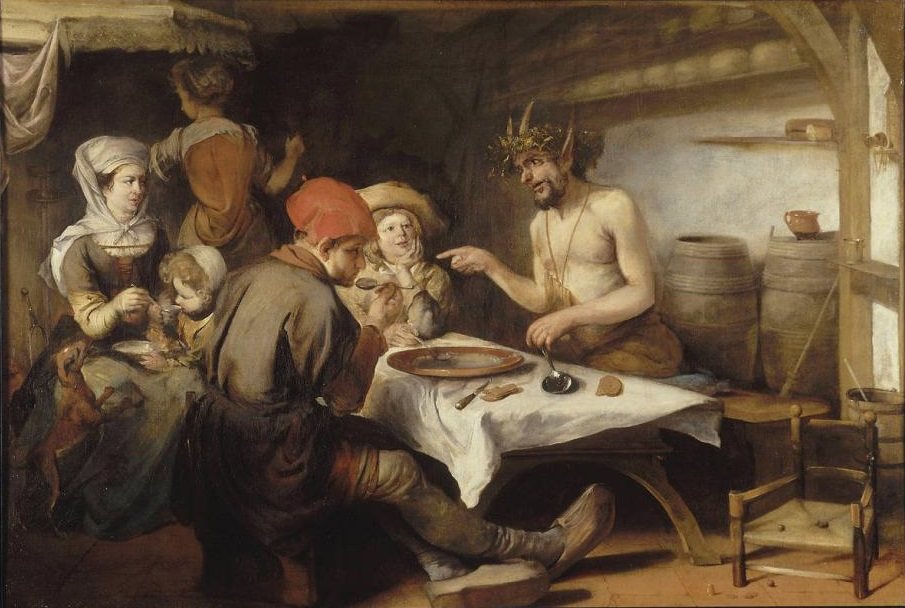
Barent Fabritius, The Satyr and the Peasant, Musée des Beaux-Arts de Rouen

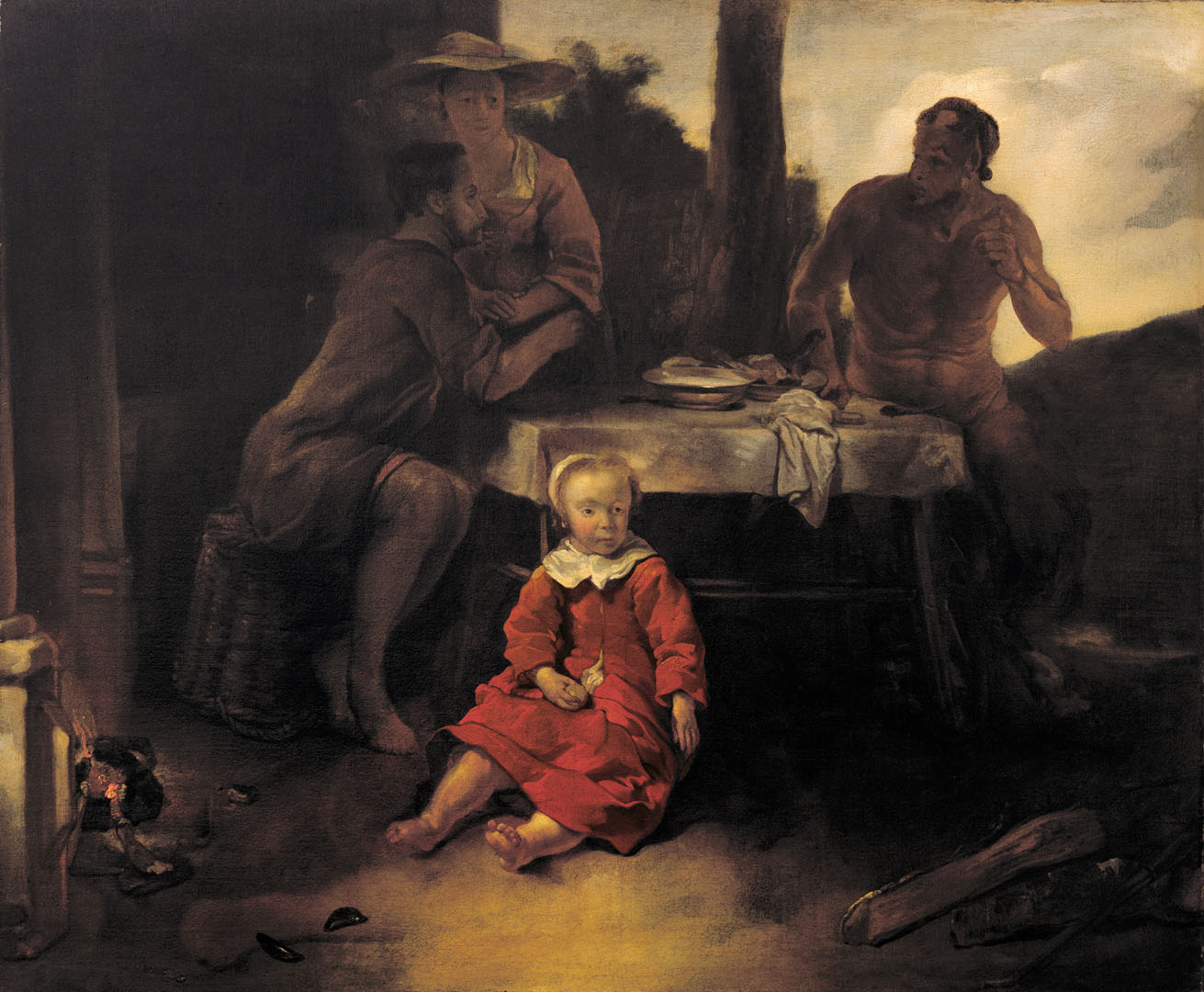
Jan van Noordt, The Satyr and the Peasant, Bader Collection, Milwaukee

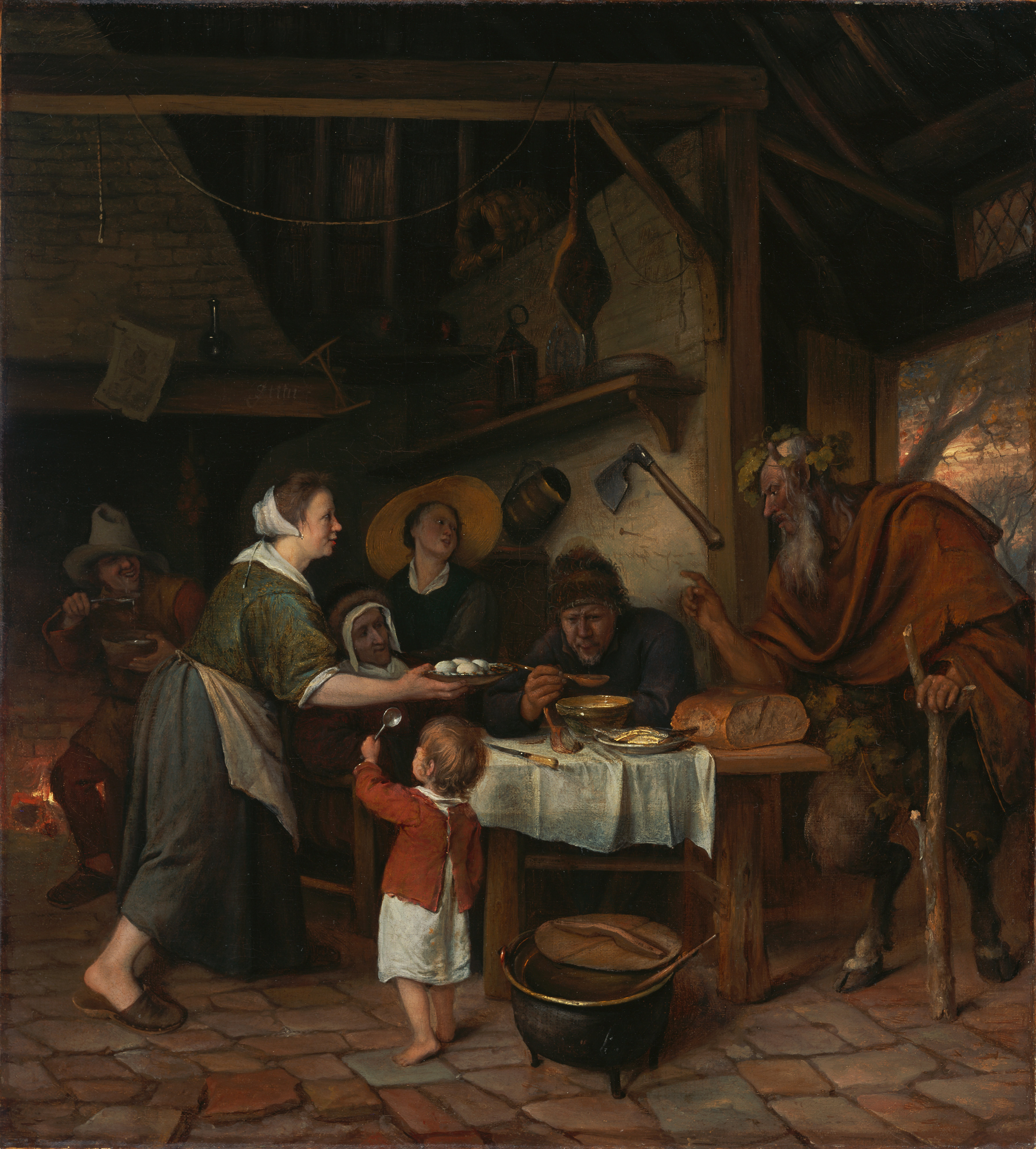
Jan Steen, The Satyr and the Peasant, J. Paul Getty Museum, 1660/2

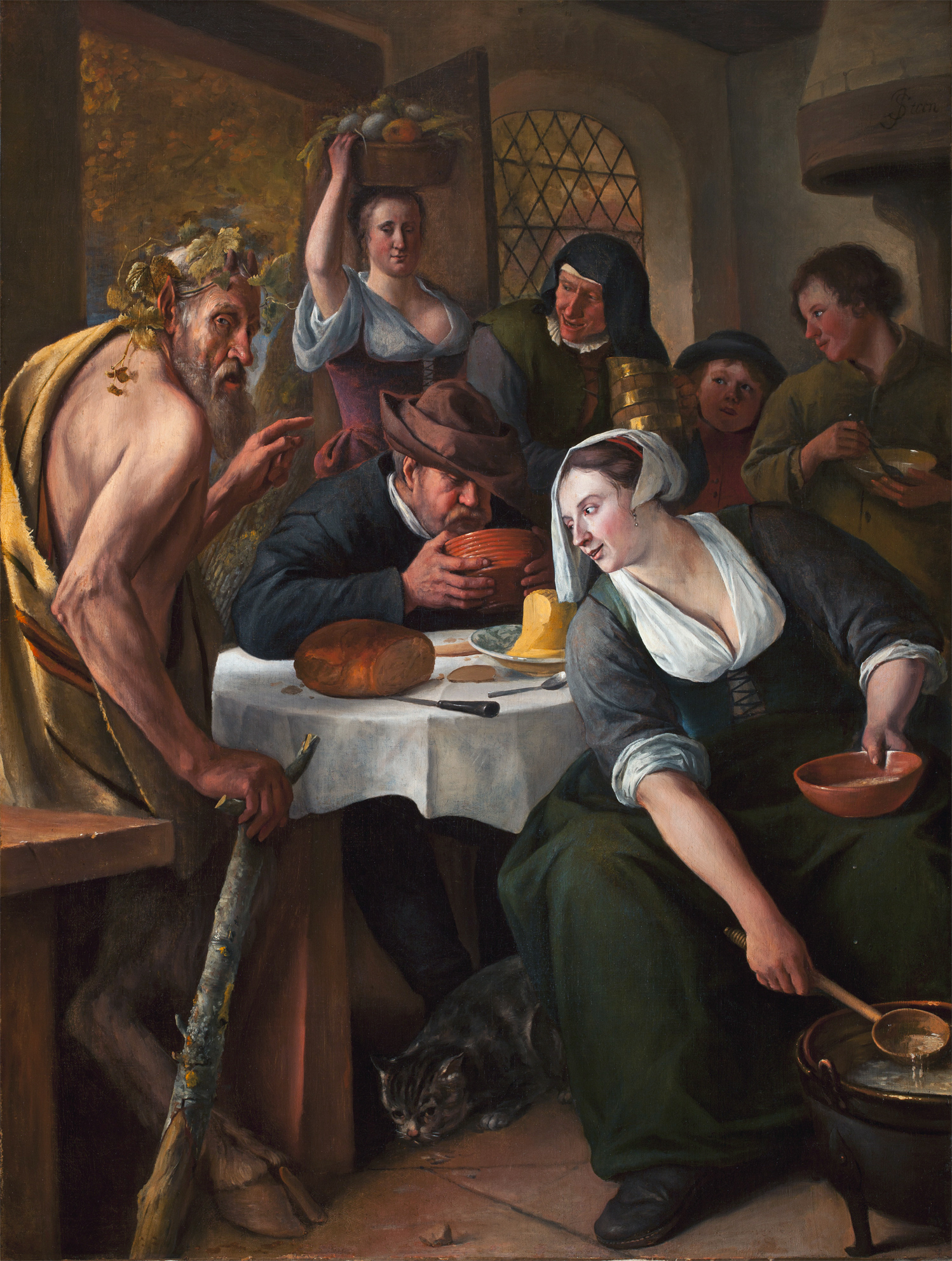
Jan Steen, The Satyr and the Peasant, Museum Bredius, Den Haag NL, 1660s

== Gallery 3: Paintings from Italy ==
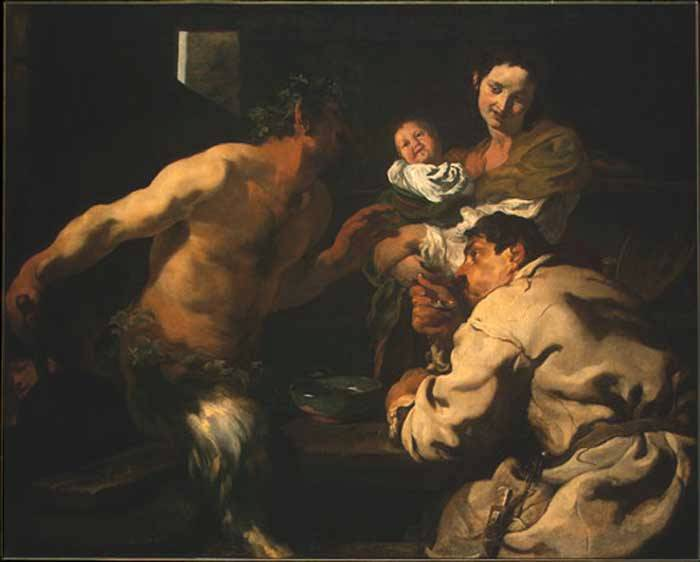
Jan Lis, a Baroque treatment of "The Satyr and the Peasant", Venice, 1623/6

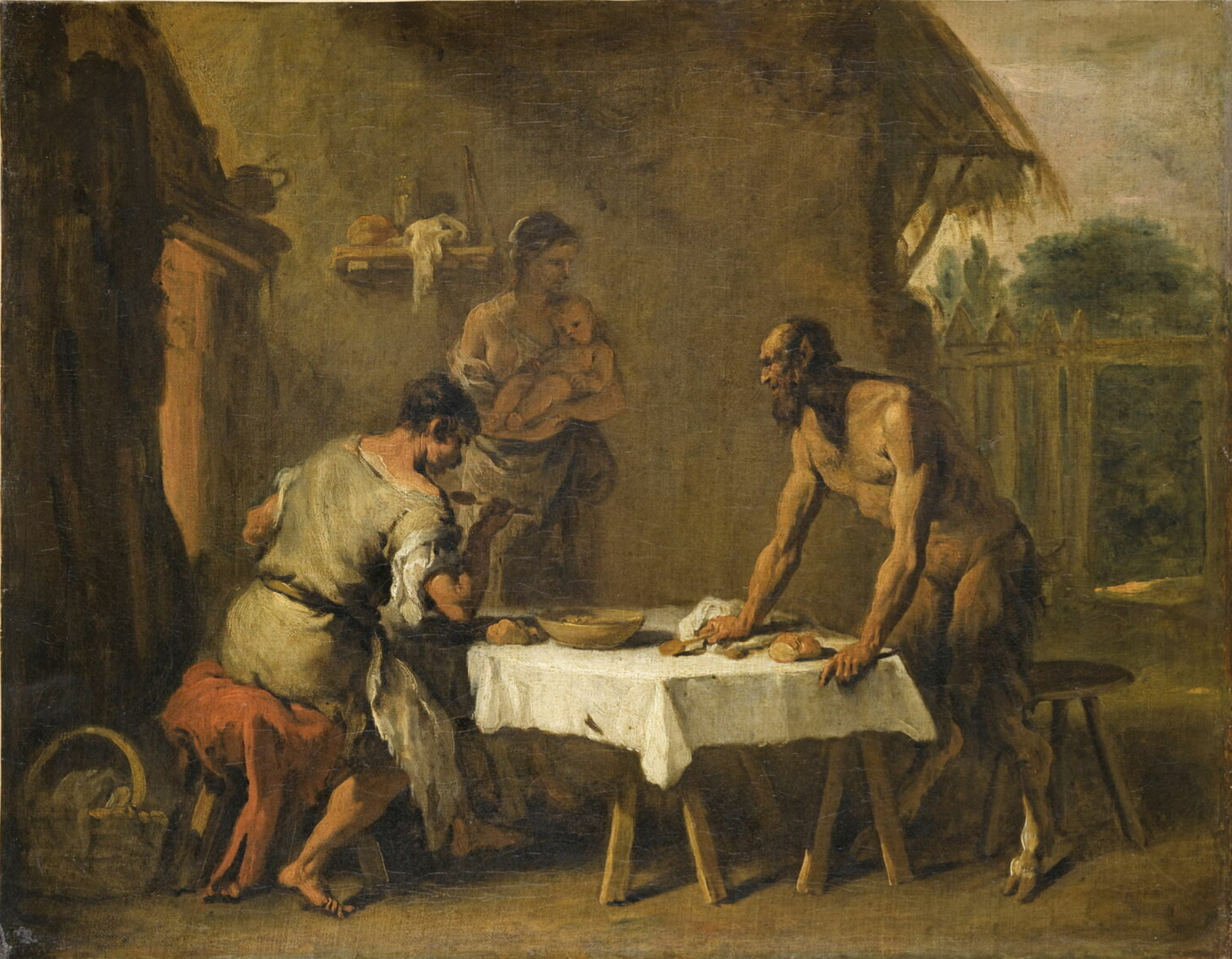
Sebastiano Ricci, The Satyr and the Peasant, c.1700

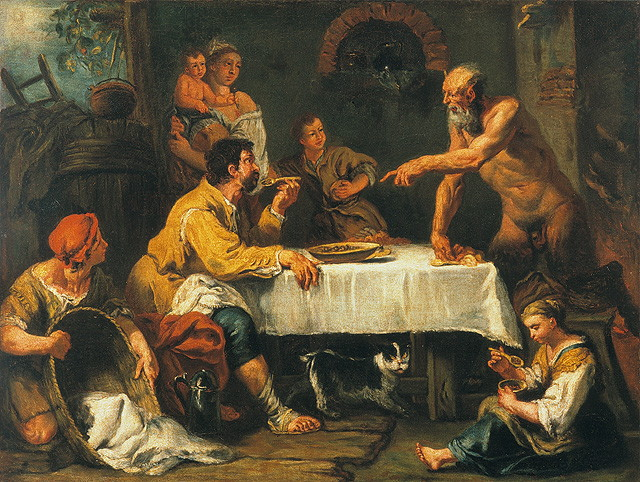
Gaspare Diziani, The Satyr and the Peasant, first half of the 18th century

== Gallery 4: Illustrations of La Fontaine's Fable ==
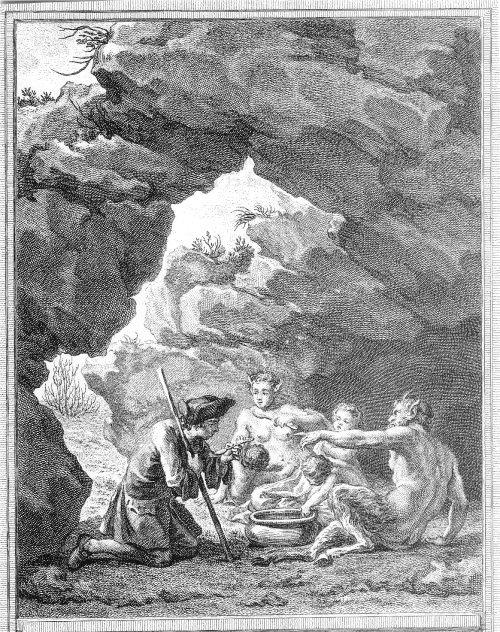
Jean-Baptiste Oudry, "Le satyre et le passant" from the 1755 illustrated edition

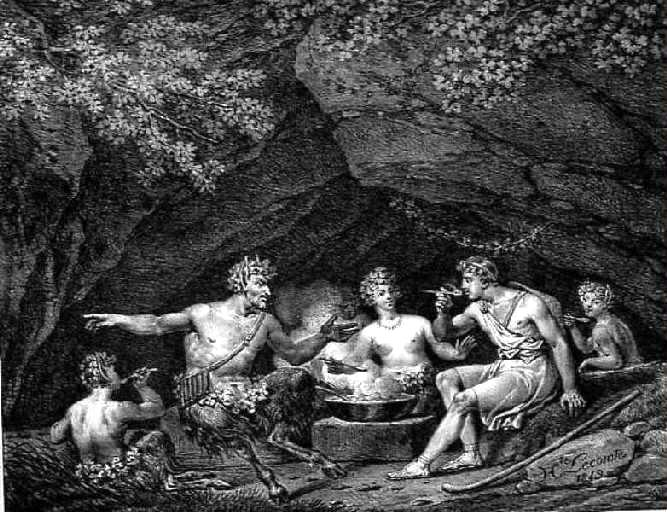
Hippolyte Lecomte, "Le satyre et le passant" from the 1818 illustrated edition

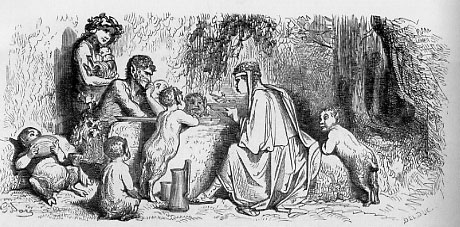
Gustave Doré, "Le satyre et le passant" from the 1867 illustrated edition

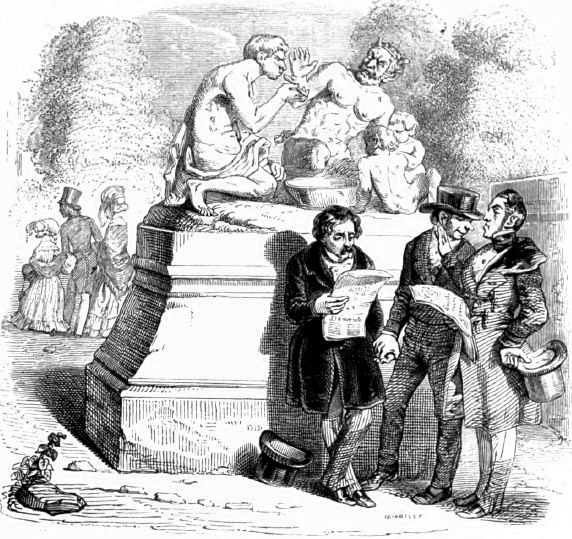
J.J. Grandville's reinterpretation of "Le satyre et le passant", 1838
