= Ernest Griset =

Painter and illustrator

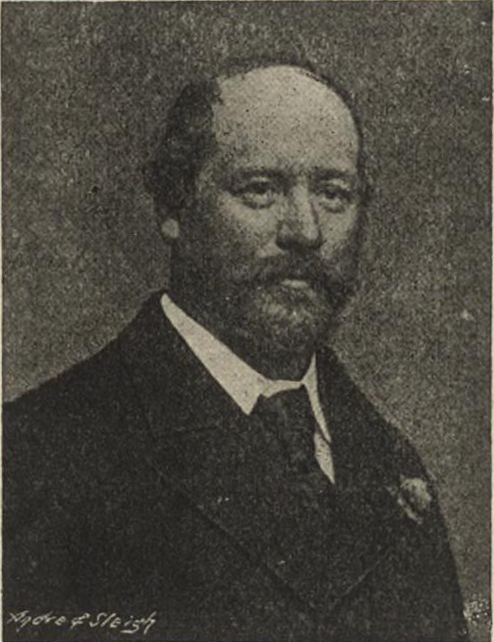

Ernest Henri Griset (24 August 1843, Boulogne-sur-Mer, – 22 March 1907, London) was a French-born painter and illustrator noted for the humorous interpretations of his subjects. He specialized especially in animal illustrations many of which were made for children's books as well as magazines like Punch.

== Life and work ==
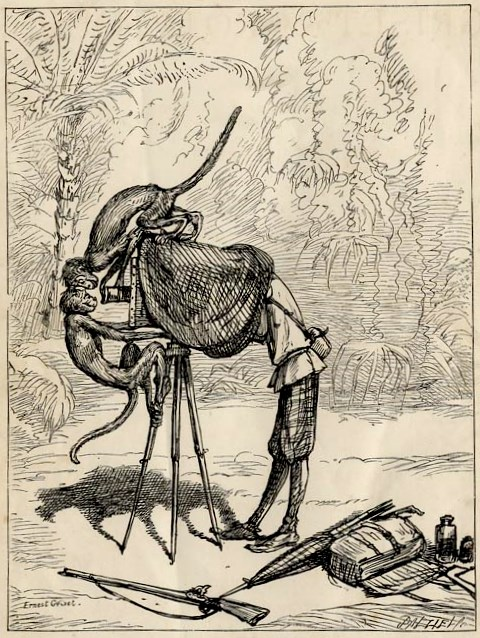
Title page drawing for Griset’s Grotesques, 1867

Griset was born in France but his parents moved to England in 1848. He studied for a while under the Belgian artist Louis Gallait before moving back to England, then regularly drew the animals at the London Zoo as a basis for his paintings and illustrations. He became known particularly for his humorous and satirical designs, which were best displayed in his two Christmas books, Griset’s Grotesques, or Jokes Drawn on Wood (1867), which was accompanied by the comic verses of Tom Hood.

Many examples of Griset's work are now in the collections of the Victoria and Albert Museum. Less well known are the prehistoric hunting scenes specially commissioned by Sir John Lubbock, some of which are in Bromley Museum, and which were a ground-breaking and sympathetic treatment of the subject. Some of his comic work appeared in Punch, where he was briefly on the staff between 1867-9, as well as in its competitor, Fun. He left Punch at the age of twenty four and worked on illustrating Aesop’s Fables (1869). Of this work a reviewer noted that "nothing so quaint as these illustrations has appeared since the days of Grandville…Griset possesses the faculty of investing his animals with human expression, without ever causing them to lose their own identity, and of making them funny without being ridiculous."

A decade later, Griset may have been complicit in an attempt to revive his sales by having a death notice appear in The Times on 9 July 1877, where he was described as having "produced countless drawings in grotesque of animals and human savages, which wise collectors obtained for trivial sums at an untidy little shop near Leicester Square". A few days later the paper admitted that he was neither dead nor even ailing. He was, in fact, to survive for another thirty years.
