= Nihon Kokugo Daijiten =

Largest Japanese language dictionary

The Nihon Kokugo Daijiten (日本国語大辞典), also known as the Nikkoku (日国) and in English as Shogakukan's Unabridged Dictionary of the Japanese Language, is the largest Japanese language dictionary published.

In the period from 1972 to 1976, Shogakukan published the 20-volume first edition. The 14-volume second edition was published in the period from November 2000 to December 2001. It includes substantial additions to and improvements over the first edition.

== Composition ==
The predecessor of the Nikkoku, the Dainihon Kokugo Jiten (大日本国語辞典) was compiled by Matsui Kanji (then a professor at the Tokyo Higher Normal School, now University of Tsukuba) and Ueda Kazutoshi (an Imperial University graduate); it was published from 1915 to 1919.

The first edition of the Nikkoku published from 1972 to 1976 included some 450,000 entries in 20 volumes, while the second edition reduced the number of volumes to 13 (by making each volume much bigger) and added 50,000 entries. The Second edition is the largest Japanese dictionary published with roughly 500,000 entries and supposedly 1,000,000 example sentences. It was composed under the collaboration of 3000 specialists, not merely Japanese language and literature scholars but also specialists of History, Buddhist studies, the Chinese Classics, and the social and physical sciences, over the course of 40 years.

Entries are listed by kana, in the gojūon (五十音) order (the native alphabetical order of the Japanese syllabary). They provide the most common kanji used to write the word, the part of the speech, the various definitions, some early examples of the use of the word, and notes on the pronunciation. The first edition required the use of a slim supplementary pamphlet to track down the date and author of the historical works cited, but the dates have now been incorporated into the actual entries in the second edition. A supplementary volume includes an index of kanji, dialect words, and greater detail of the historical citations.

The concise edition (精選版〕日本国語大辞典), published in 2005-2006, is based on the 2nd edition, with 3 volumes, 300,000 entries, 300,000 examples.

On July 25, 2024, Shogakukan formally began work on what will become the third edition of the Nikkoku. This edition will utilize modern technologies such as cloud computing and digital typesetting in its creation and (eventually) revision processes, and is scheduled to be completed in 2032, followed by a physical release in 2034.

== Uses ==
Shogakukan has compared its Nikkoku dictionary to the Oxford English Dictionary (OED) because the Nikkoku represents the largest and most thorough dictionary of the Japanese language, and also provides etymologies and historical citations for its entries. Most entries contain citations from early known usages of the word in a text.

The Nikkoku, because of its size, has many features normally found only in specialized dictionaries. These include: definitions and etymologies of foreign loan words (gairaigo, 外来語), highly recent words (gendai yōgo, 現代用語), archaic words (kogo, 古語), idiomatic compound phrases (jukugo, 熟語), words that can be written using more than one possible Chinese character to produce subtle differences in meaning (dōkun iji, 同訓異字), and Chinese characters that are written differently but have the same pronunciation (iji dōkun, 異字同訓), some slang (ingo, 隠語), and words used only in regional dialects (hōgen, 方言). Certain specialized dictionaries may have a few entries that do not exist in the Nikkoku, and many specialized scholars will need to rely on specialized dictionaries, but it is certainly sufficient for most general reference needs.

== Evaluation ==
The cost and size of this dictionary makes it somewhat unsuitable as a desktop reference; however, it is essential for learning the full range of a word's meanings.

== Online ==
On July 2, 2007, the second edition of the dictionary became available online via Japan Knowledge. For a monthly fee, it is accessible to individuals and institutions.
