= The King Drinks =

Series of paintings by Jacob Jordaens

The King Drinks or The Bean King may refer to one of ten surviving works of the same title by the Flemish Baroque artist Jacob Jordaens:

- The King Drinks (Brussels), one of two in that museum
- The King Drinks (St. Petersburg)
- Galerie Heim, Basel
- Brunswick
- Kassel
- Chatsworth House
- Paris (Louvre)
- Lille
- Valenciennes
- Vienna (Kunsthistorisches Museum)
Selected versions

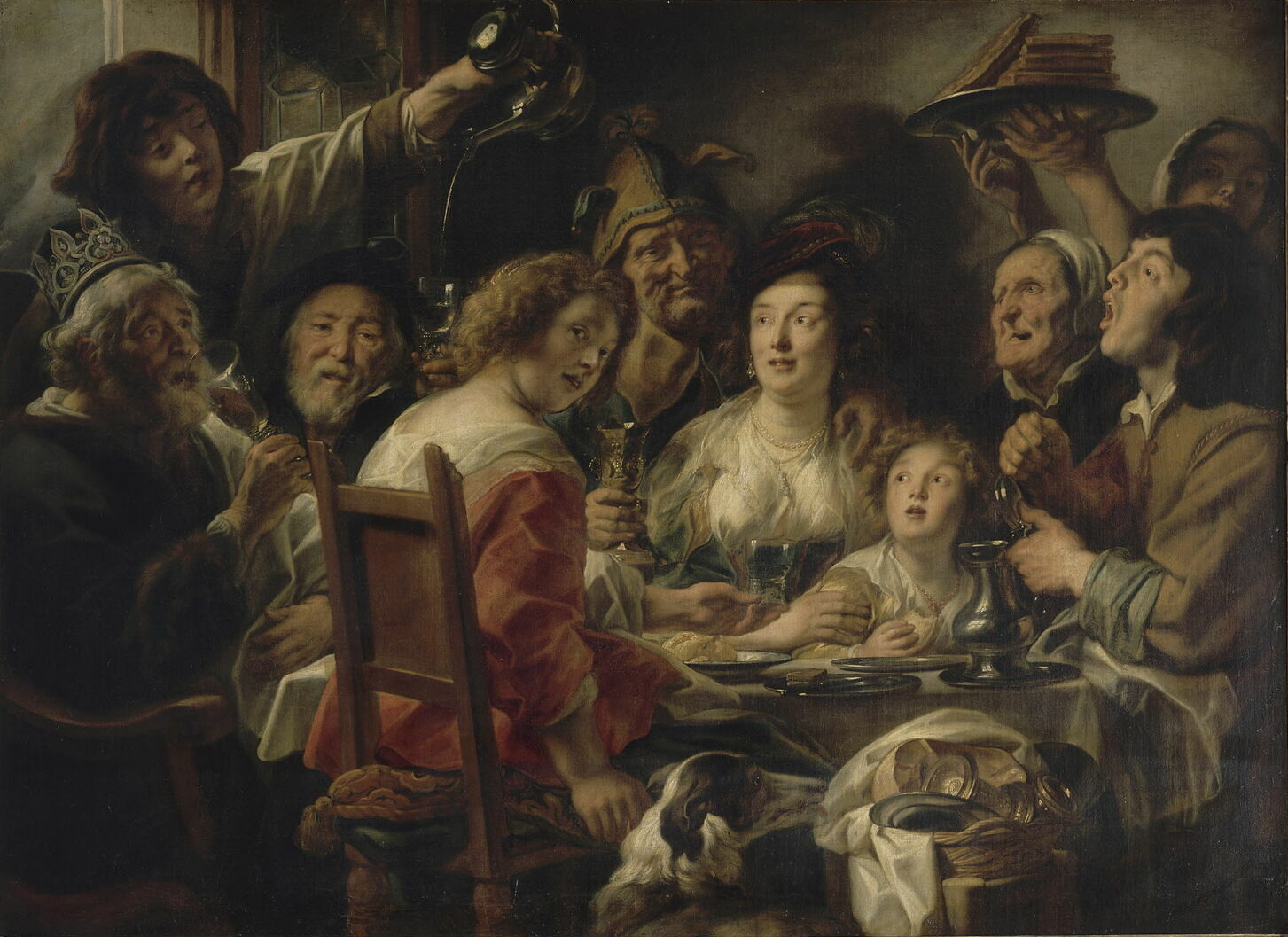
Paris

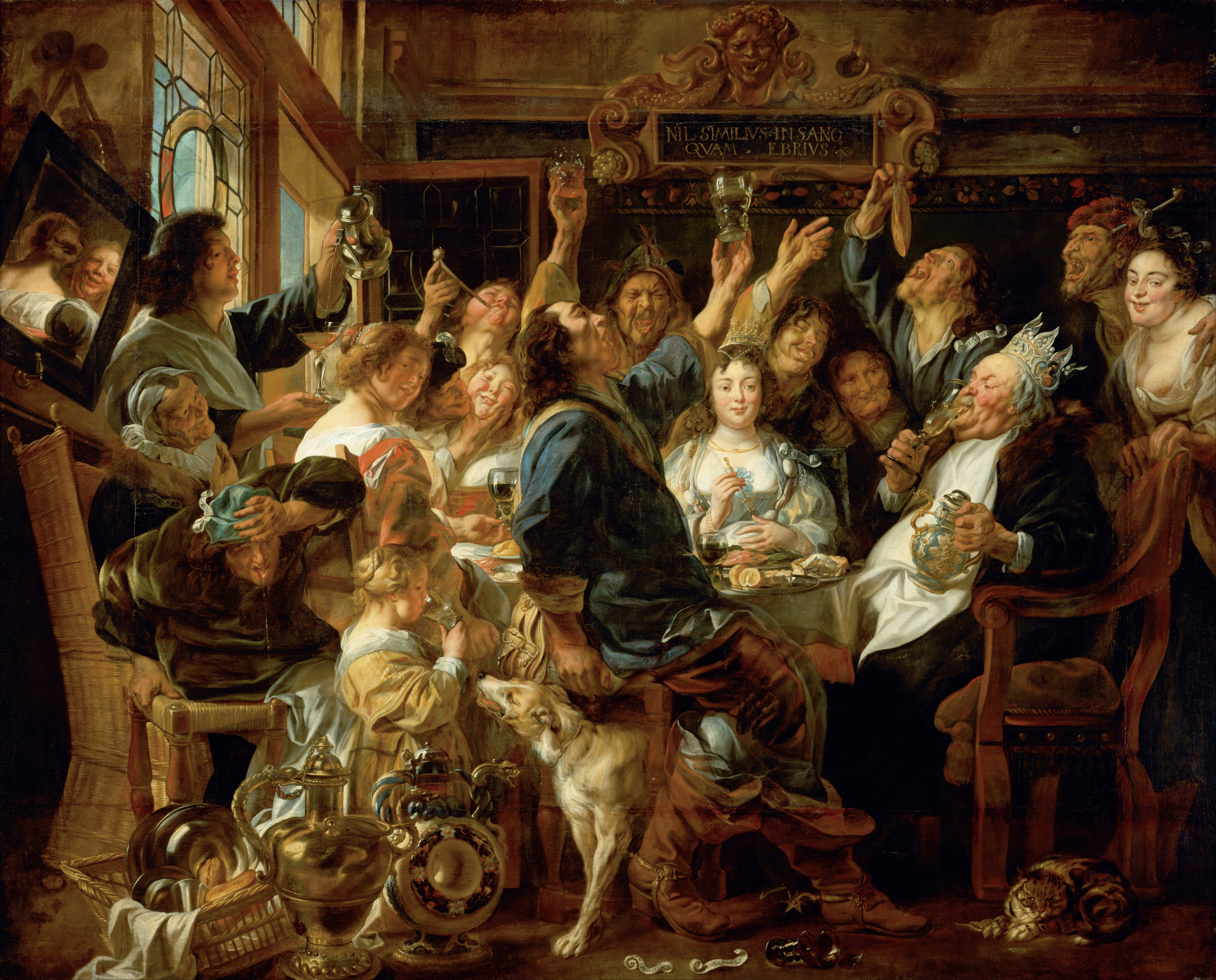
Vienna

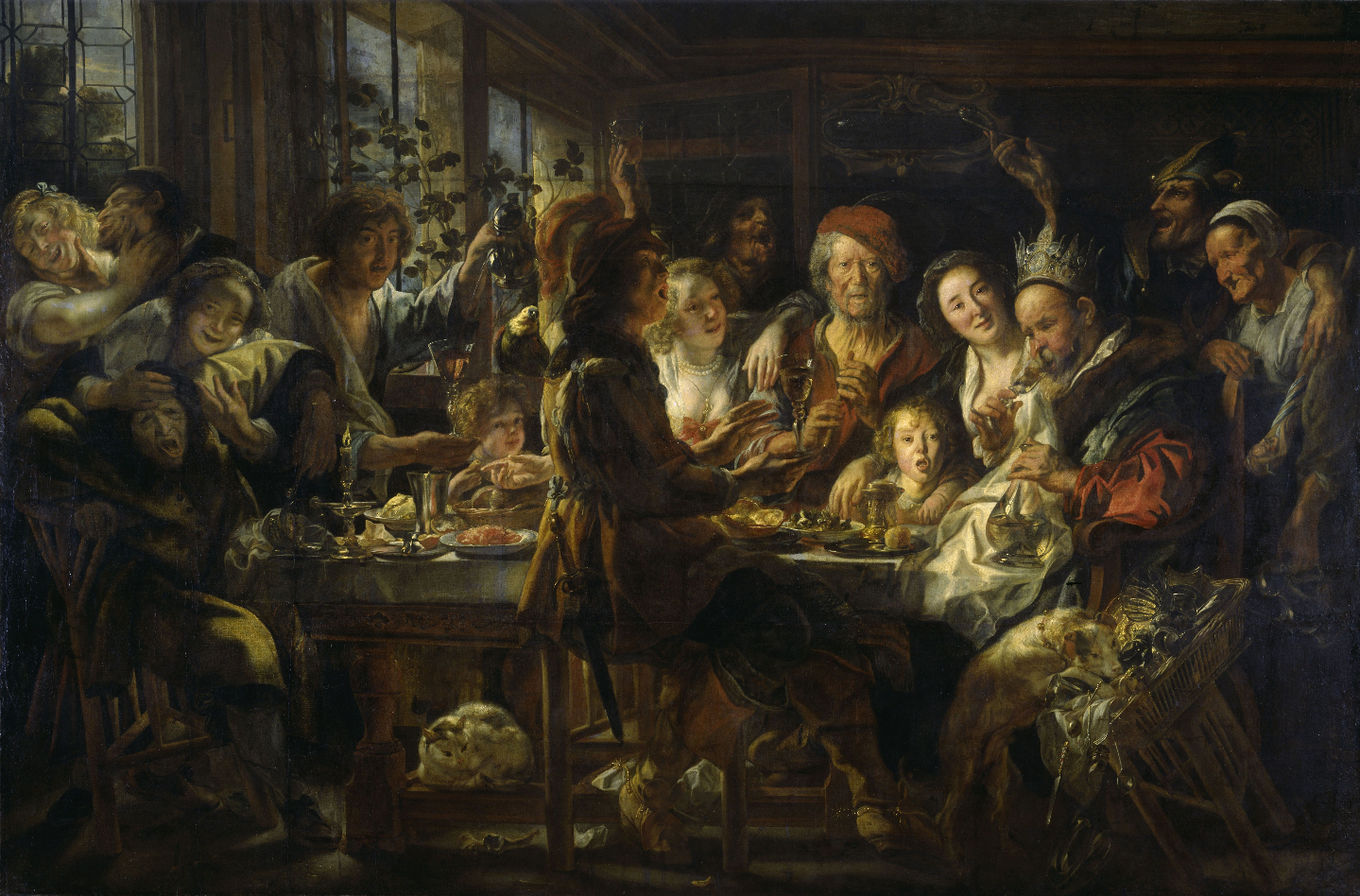
Kassel

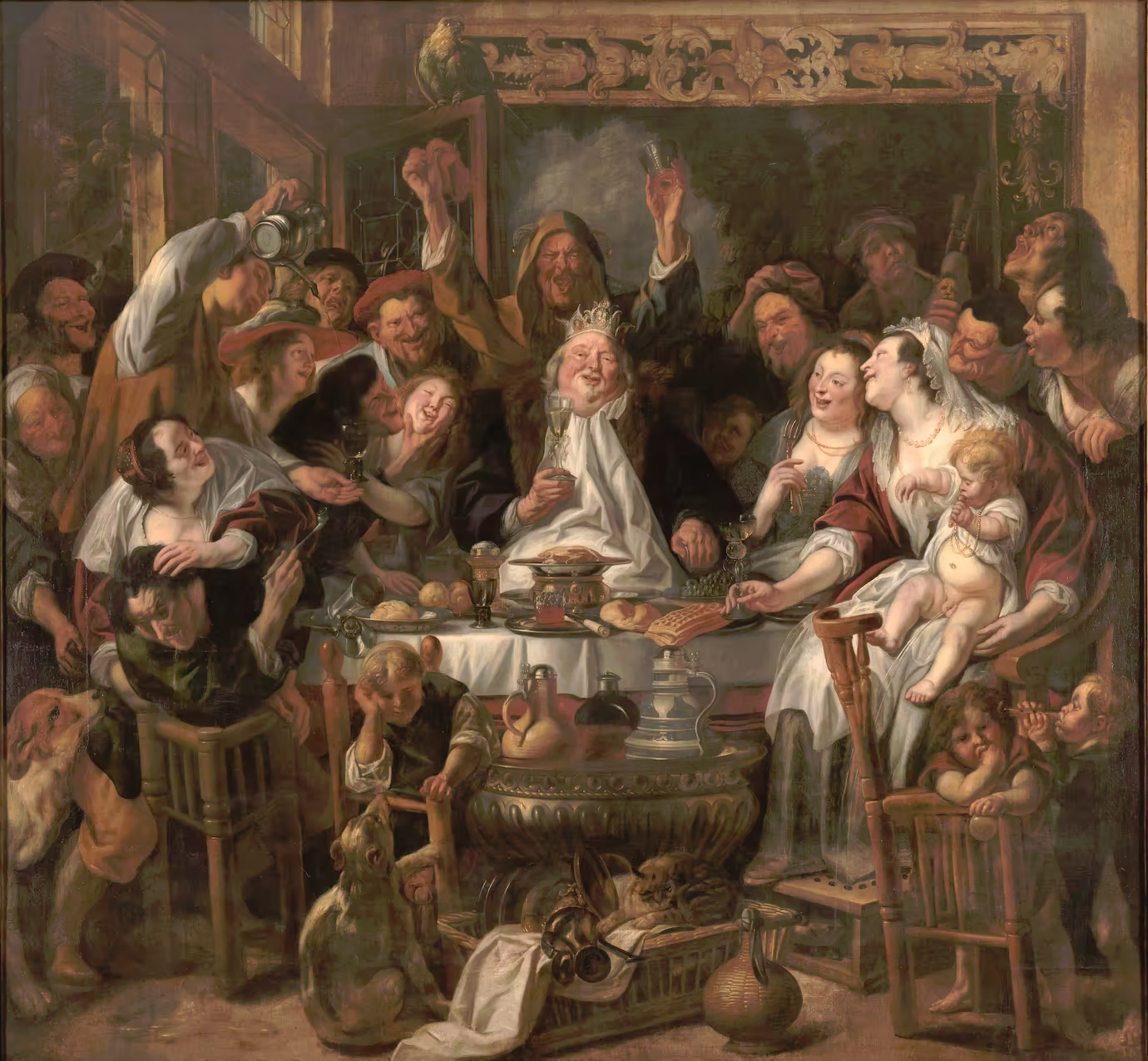
Brussels, 1638

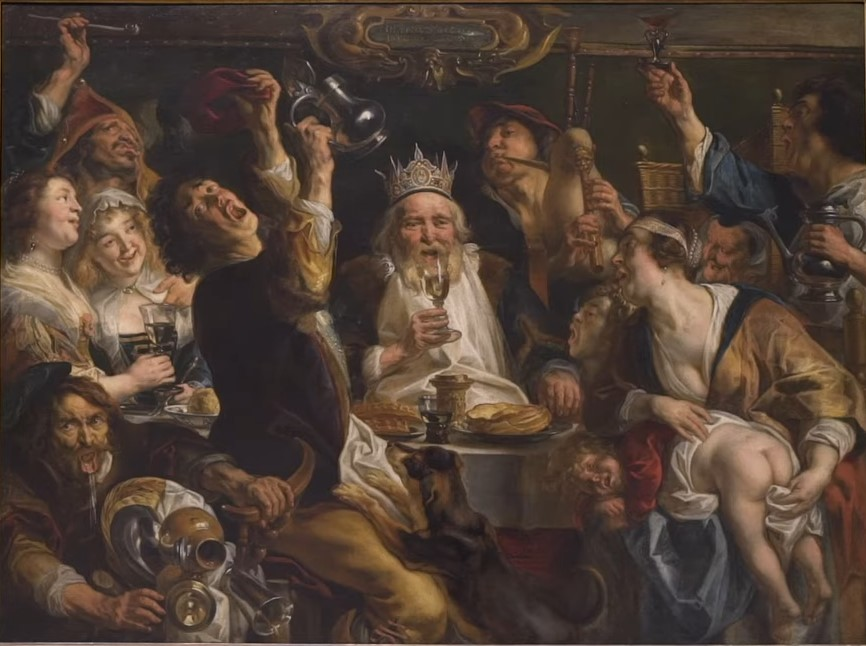
Brussels, 1640
