= The King Drinks (Jordaens, St Petersburg) =

Painting by Jacob Jordaens

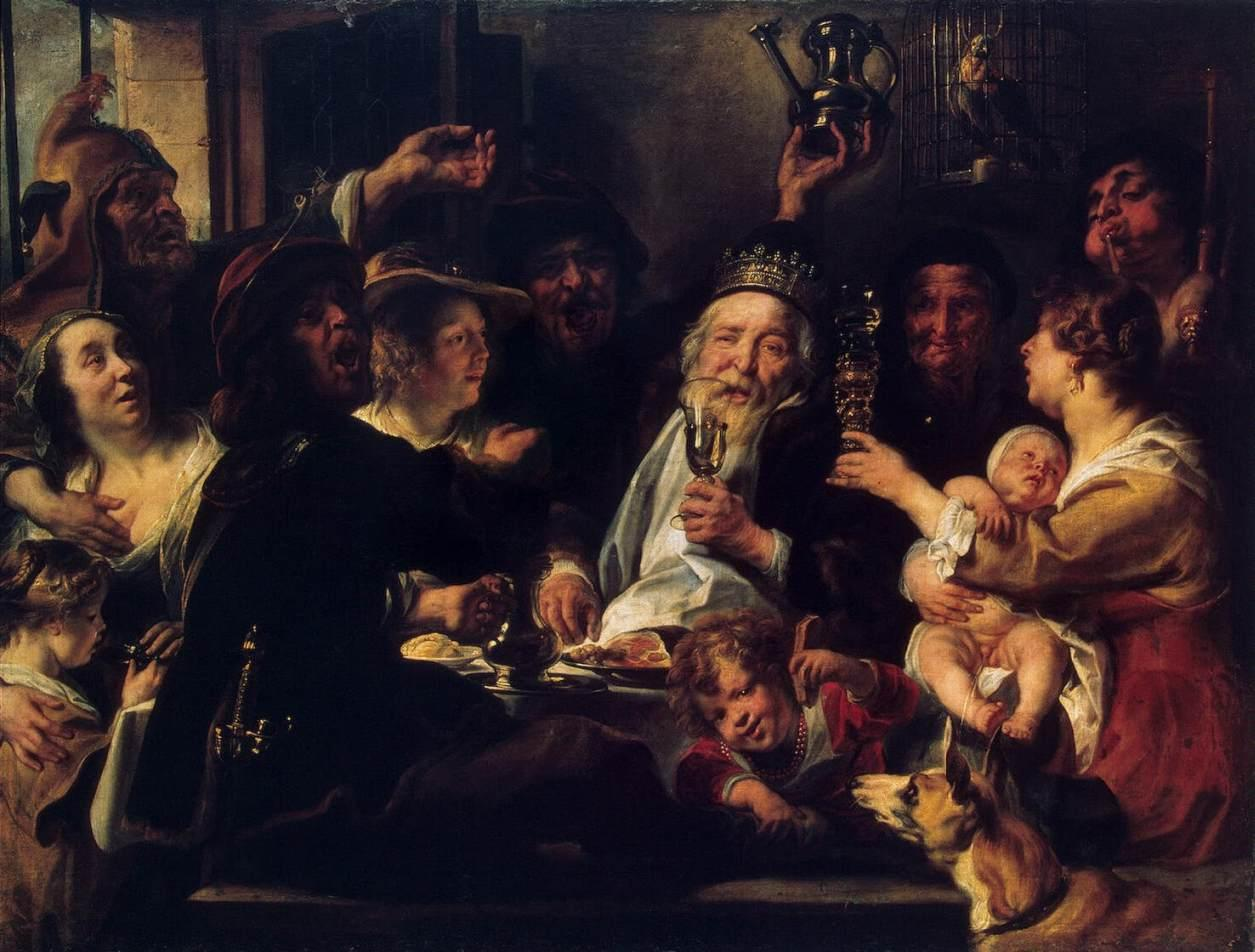
- Artist: Jacob Jordaens
- Year: c. 1638
- Medium: Oil on canvas
- Movement: Flemish Baroque
- Dimensions: 160 cm × 213 cm (63 in × 84 in)
- Location: Hermitage Museum; Saint Petersburg

The King Drinks or The Bean King is an oil on canvas painting by the Flemish Baroque artist Jacob Jordaens, from c. 1638. It is held in the Hermitage Museum, in Saint Petersburg.

== History ==
Its history is unknown before 18 August 1762, when it was sold at the Wirman auction in Amsterdam. It was resold at the sale of J. van der Mark's collection on 25 August 1773. By the end of the 18th century it was already in Alexander Bezborodko's collection, from which it was inherited by Nikolai Alexandrovich Kushelev-Bezborodko, who in turn left it to the Museum of the Academy of Fine Arts. It was transferred to a new canvas by the restorer Umetsky in 1905. The Museum of the Academy of Fine Arts was dissolved in 1922 and The King Drinks and most of its other works were moved to the Hermitage Museum.

A variant painting of the same title, executed by Jordaens in 1640, is in the Royal Museum of Fine Arts of Belgium in Brussels.

== Sources ==
- (in Russian) Бабина Н. П., Грицай Н. И. Фламандская живопись XVII—XVIII веков. Каталог коллекции. — СПб.: Изд-во Государственного Эрмитажа, 2005. — С. 211.
