= The King Drinks (Jordaens, Brussels) =

1640 painting by Jacob Jordaens

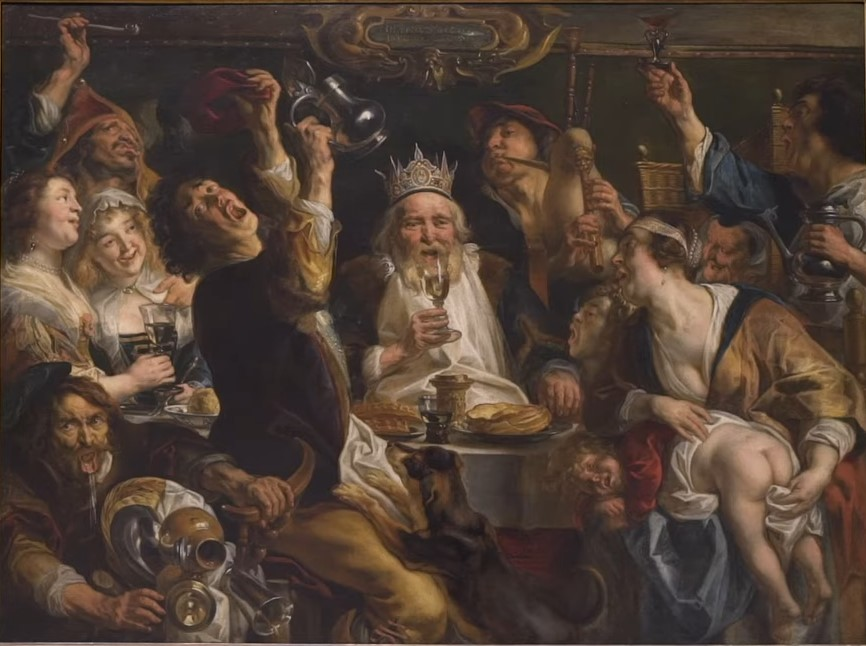
- Artist: Jacob Jordaens
- Year: 1640
- Medium: Oil on canvas
- Movement: Flemish Baroque
- Dimensions: 156 cm × 210 cm (61 in × 83 in)
- Location: Oldmasters Museum; Brussels

The King Drinks is an oil on canvas painting on canvas by the Flemish Baroque artist Jacob Jordaens, from 1640. It is held in the Oldmasters Museum, part of the Royal Museum of Fine Arts of Belgium, in Brussels. It shows the celebration of Twelfth Night, with its king.

Jordaens's earlier painting of the same subject, executed in 1638, is in the Hermitage Museum, in Saint Petersburg.

== Sources ==
- (in Spanish) Cirlot, Lourdes (ed.): Jordaens, «El rey bebe», en las pp. 108–111 de Museos Reales de Bellas Artes • Bruselas, Col. «Museos del Mundo», Tomo 25, Espasa, 2007. ISBN 978-84-674-3829-1
