= Mercury and Argus (Jordaens) =

Painting from Jacob Jordaens

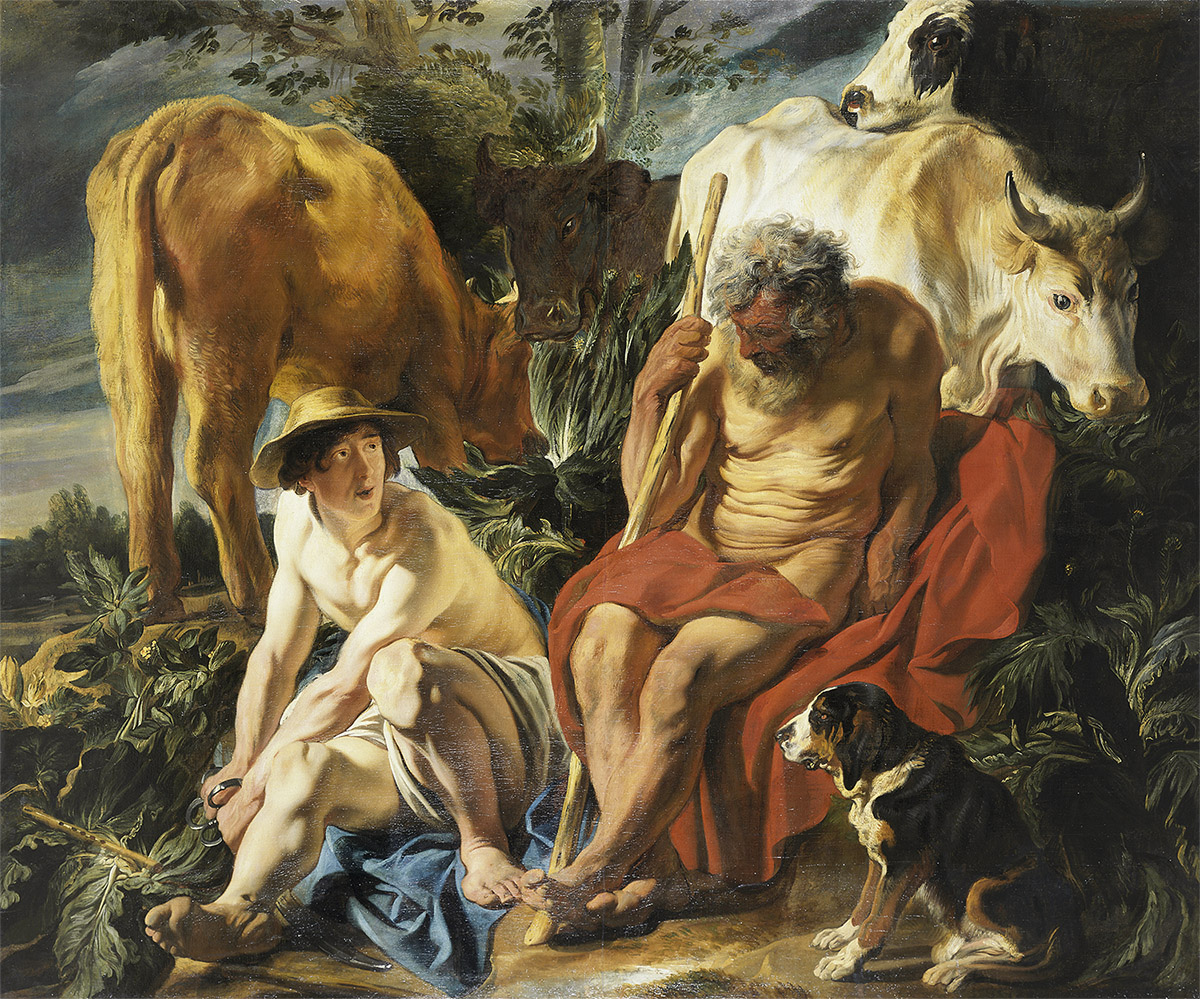
- Artist: Jacob Jordaens
- Year: 1620
- Catalog: inventory number H-679
- Medium: Oil on canvas
- Movement: Flemish Baroque
- Dimensions: 202 cm × 241 cm (79.5 in × 94.8 in)
- Location: Museum of Fine Arts of Lyon, Lyon

Mercury and Argus is an oil painting on canvas executed ca. 1620 by the Flemish painter Jacob Jordaens. It is in the collection of the Museum of Fine Arts of Lyon. It is the first of many versions that Jordaens painted of Ovid's rendering of the mythological story of the murder by Mercury of the giant Argus. Some of the other versions depict other scenes of the story.

== History ==
Jacob Jordaens (also known as Jacques Jordaens) was born in Antwerp, the Habsburg Netherlands, in 1593. He grew up in a rich family and received a good education, proven by his biblical and mythological knowledge. In 1620, he painted Mercury and Argus and started collaborating with Van Dyck and Rubens.

The Mayor of Lyon Jean-François Termes acquired the artwork in 1843 for the sum of 2,000 francs (US$1,990). It was restored in 1991.

== Background story ==
The painting depicts a scene from the myth of Mercury, Argus (Argos) and Io as told in The Metamorphoses written by Ovid (I, 583; IX, 687). In the story Jupiter (Zeus) has fallen in love with Io, a priestess of Hera, his wife, who quickly discovers the affair. Jupiter transforms himself into a bull and transforms Io into a beautiful, white heifer in order to hide from Hera's wrath. Hera sees through this scheme and demands the heifer as a present. To end their affair, Hera puts Io under the guard of the giant Argus Panoptes, who has 100 eyes. Jupiter commands his son Mercury (Hermes) to set Io free by lulling Argus to sleep with an enchanted flute. Mercury, disguised as a shepherd, is invited by Argus to his camp. Mercury charms him with lullabies and then cuts his head off.

Jordaens depicts in the picture the moment when Mercury stealthily picks up his sword to murder the sleeping Argus. The protagonists of the fable are not shown in their divine condition. He has turned Argus into a tired and shaggy old man who does not have 100 eyes and has lost his frightening aspect. Mercury is a simple shepherd with dirty feet who has just numbed Argus' vigilance by playing a flute which is lying on the ground.

== Analysis ==
=== Description ===
The framing is narrowly focused on the figures; the canvas is cut on the right-hand side and there is little room left for scenery. The heifers are located on the upper part of the painting. Their bodies form an upside down triangle and form, along with the bodies of the characters, a chiasmus (heifer, human, human, heifer) that appeals to the eye. The background is in fact a foreshadow of the murder; the colours of the sky and the bushes are dark, and three of the heifers are looking at the spectator.

Mercury, disguised as a barefooted young shepherd with a straw hat, is gazing at Argus (who, unlike the myth, has only two eyes) and is about to strike a lethal blow. Argus is asleep, his hand on his stick. Argus' dog is also present, but seems sheepish and impassive.

In fact, the dog is looking at the hidden knife under Mercury's leg. Mercury's movement with his knife, from the bottom to the top in a circular way, is highlighting the impression of movement and reinforces the suggested dramatic tension.

=== Colours and lights ===
The colours are dark: there are brown and dark green tones for the bushes at the left bottom corner, on the right hand side and in the middle; dark blue and shades of grey for the sky, but also very light colours, typical of the baroque style with the chiaroscuro technique, that enlighten the characters and the action and highlight their anatomy.

The light of the artwork is similar to the light of a thunderstorm; the sky is dark and the light is raw. The sky confirms this feeling of a calm before the storm and sets a dynamic characteristic to the artwork along with curves that set an impression of movement. The leaves and the heifers also give a gloomy impression because of their very dark colours.

While the landscape is a foreshadow, the scene is not violent because the murder is on the verge of happening. Mercury is dressed in blue and white while Argus is dressed in red, and these two colours are opposed. Blue refers to Mercury's divinity and white his feigned innocence. The red colour announces Argus' death because it is the colour of blood, but it also is an echo of Caravaggio's Saint Jerome whose red robe represents the colour of wisdom. It can also be interpreted as the colour of lust, as if Argus, charmed, was in the same time perverted by Mercury. The colours of the heifers are in opposition too; while Io is white, the colour of purity, there is also a black one, a symbol of fatality and death, that covers a corner of the painting, showing a point of no return.

=== Esthetic and reception ===
The contrasts and the movements are highlighted by a low angle shot point of view of the scene. There is no supernatural aspect and the painting is clearly influenced by realism, as if the scene could happen in real life. There is a precision in the traits of the human characters, precision that can be found once again in paintings of Caravaggio. There is a true study of anatomy, shown in Argus' shrivelled up skin. Mercury's muscles are prominent. This precision reinforces the baroque style of the artwork.

The 16th-century Flemish painter and art theorist Karel van Mander gave an example of interpretation of Ovid's myth; more than a conflict between two generations, there is a lesson of morality. Argus is charmed by Mercury who represents lust and desire, and finally dies by his hand. This shows how lust weakens man's ability to reason and undermines his sense of duty. Jordaens likes to give an echo to morals in his paintings, even in those with prosaic subject-matters. Mercury and Argus is a representation of the myth, but also renews it with a very baroque style influenced by realism that re-establishes the myth in reality and popularises it.
