= The Signs of the Zodiac =

Painting series by Jacob Jordaens

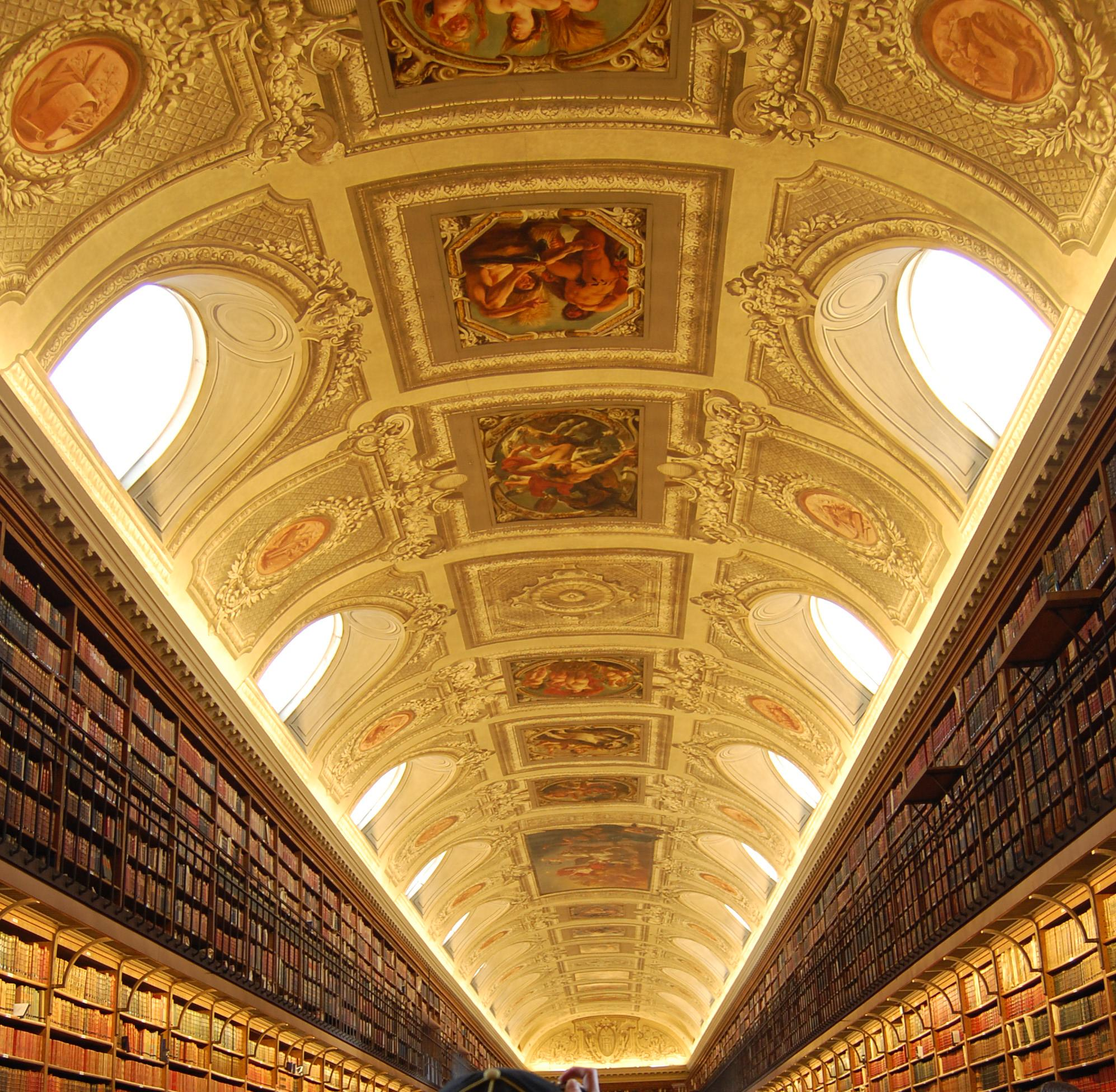
The ceiling of the East Gallery

The Signs of the Zodiac is a series of twelve allegorical paintings of the signs of the Zodiac, originally painted around 1640 by Jacob Jordaens and bought by the French Senate in 1802 for the ceiling of the East Gallery of the Palais du Luxembourg in Paris. The paintings represent the signs of the zodiac through stories from Greek and Roman mythology.

== History of the series ==
Jordaens originally created the series for his luxurious Antwerp mansion, where it adorned two rooms located at the back. The journey of the twelve paintings after the painter's death is not entirely clear. They seem to have been in Germany, until they reappeared with the Paris painting dealer Langlier. Here they were seen in 1802 by Baraguey, the assistant of the architect Chalgrin, who was in charge of the installation of the Senate in the Palais du Luxembourg. He immediately grasped the exceptional interest of these canvases "with a ceiling perspective" and recommended to buy them for the Palais de Luxembourg. The French Senate ordered the acquisition of the series, which was then acquired for the price of 4,500 gold francs.

The twelve canvases were mounted on the vault of the East Gallery, which at the time housed the museum of painting open to the public. It was necessary to settle some critical issues, in particular that of the direction of the reading of the Zodiac. During the French Revolution a new calendar had been introduced in France. The question thus arose as to whether the paintings should be installed according to the traditional astronomical order by starting with Aries or in accordance with the new calendar by making the solar year begin at the end of September with Libra. Another question was whether the Zodiac series should start from north to south (i.e. in the direction of the visit to the museum, the public entrance of which was on rue de Vaugirard), or, on the contrary, from south to north, i.e. beginning with the rooms assigned to the senators. The first option prevailed, so that the final panel of the series was the sign of the Virgin, just above the door to the eastern landing. Today the Palais du Luxembourg houses the Musée du Luxembourg and the East Gallery is the museum's library annex. The East Gallery is accessed from the corridor on the east landing so that it appears that, in contrast to all known calendars, the Zodiac starts on August 22 (the sign of the Virgin).

The 12 works were marouflaged on the ceiling of the East Gallery and in the center was added a painting of Aurora by Antoine-François Callet.

== Description and meaning ==
The paintings represent the signs of the zodiac through stories from Greek and Roman mythology.

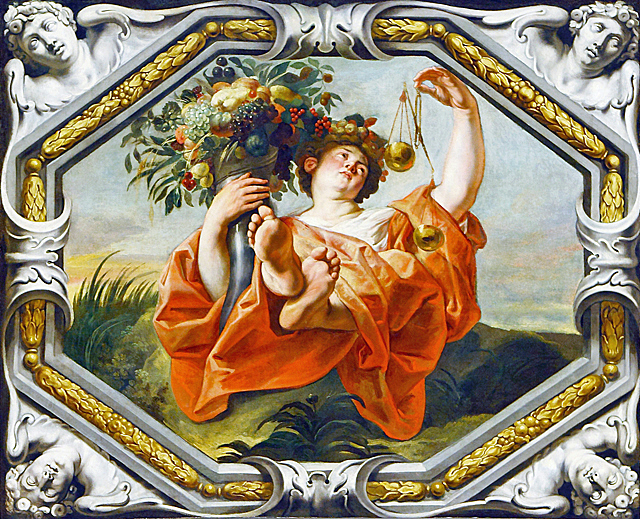
Libra (September)

A woman, crowned with fruit, holds in one hand a cornucopia filled with grapes, symbolizing the month of the grape harvest. In the other hand she holds a balance, a reference to the return of the equality of days and nights at the time of the autumnal equinox on 22 September.

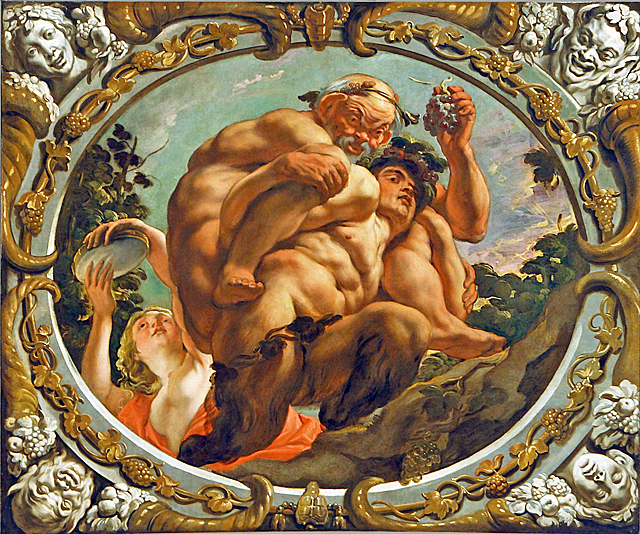
Scorpion (October)

This panel shows a bacchanal or feast of Bacchus. A young satyr is carrying on his shoulders the drunk Silenus who is holding up a bunch of grapes in one hand. The pair are crowned with vine branches. A bacchante follows them while playing a tambourine. The bacchanal symbolizes that in this month the wine growers rejoice and relax from their work by tasting the fruits of their harvest. The scorpion in the border alludes to the malignity of the diseases caused by the humid winds, charged with dangerous vapors, which are felt in this month.

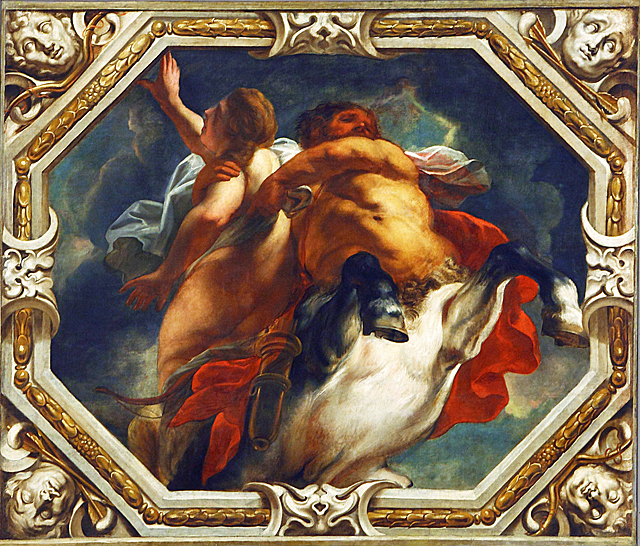
Sagittarius (November)

The centaur Nessus kidnaps Deianira, the wife of Hercules, and crosses the river Evinos. The centaur, armed with arrows, symbolizes that November, when the earth is covered with frost, is a good period for hunting.

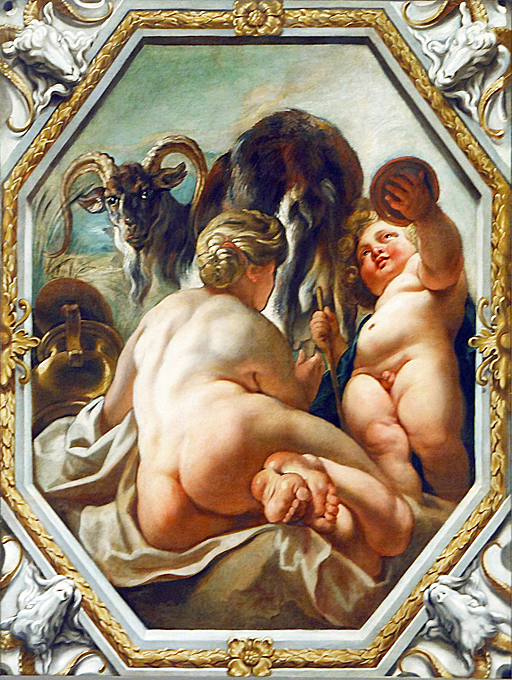
Capricorn (December)

The nymph Adrasteia milks the goat Amalthea, to give the milk to the child Zeus. Zeus is near her holding a cup. The goat is a symbol for the sun which seems to be always rising in December, just like a wild goat always likes to climb up the steep rocks.

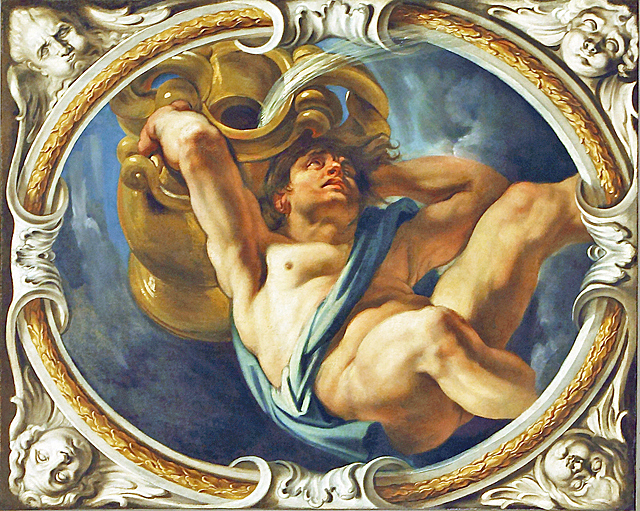
Aquarius (January)

A young man, in the middle of the clouds, pours torrents of water on the earth. He symbolizes the rainy season.

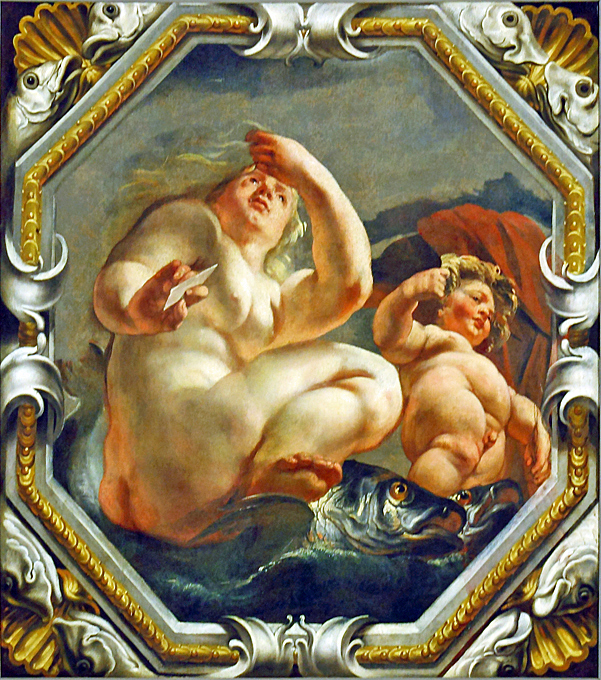
Pisces (February)

Venus and her son Cupid armed with his bow, carried by fish, are moving across the waters that the winds are agitating with violence. Venus and her son are trying to hold the light draperies that cover them. The agitation of the sea and the fish symbolize that February is the month of strong winds and good fishing.

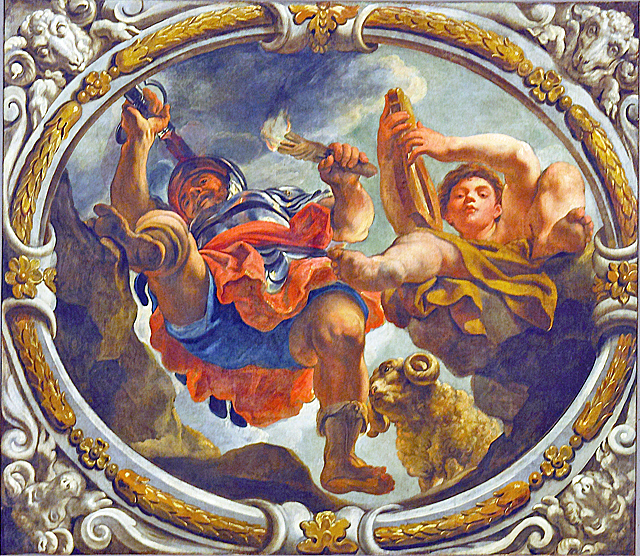
Aries (March)

Mars, armed from head to toe, holding his sword in one hand, shaking the torch of war in the other, descends from the top of the rocks. A shepherd is next to him playing the zither. A ram is standing behind him. Mars, the god of war, symbolizes that March is the time when armies start out on campaigns. The shepherd and the ram symbolize the return of spring when the flocks come out from their sheepfolds.

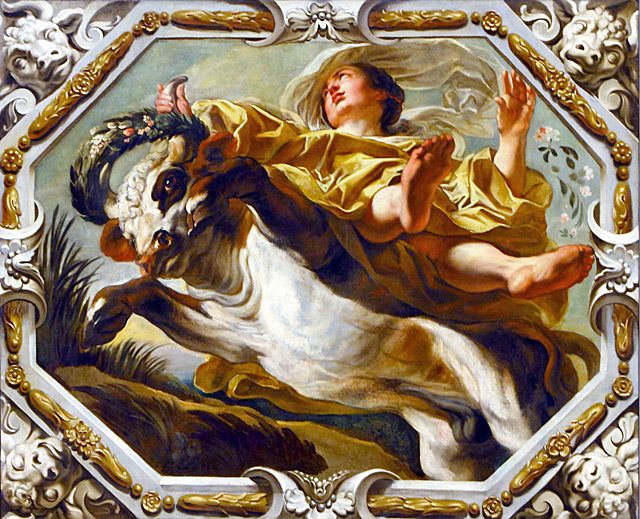
Taurus (April)

Jupiter in the form of a bull, his head crowned with flowers, kidnaps the nymph Europa. The bull symbolizes the strength acquired in April by the sun, the warmth of which makes trees and plants bloom.

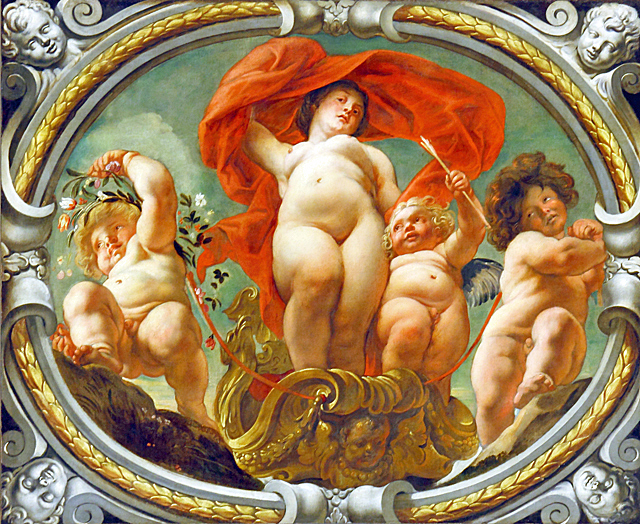
Gemini (May)

Two children are pulling a chariot on which Venus is standing with her veil floating on the winds. Next to her is her son Cupid who leans on her while holding an arrow in one hand. One of the children pulling the chariot is spreading flowers on the earth. The goddess of love Venus and the god of desire Cupid symbolize that May is the mating season when the entire natural world is submitted to them. The two children represent the twins Castor and Pollux who, according to the ancient mythology, were changed into the constellation Gemini. When the sun enters this sign, the heat is doubled, the days become longer and the grass of the meadows starts to grow fast.

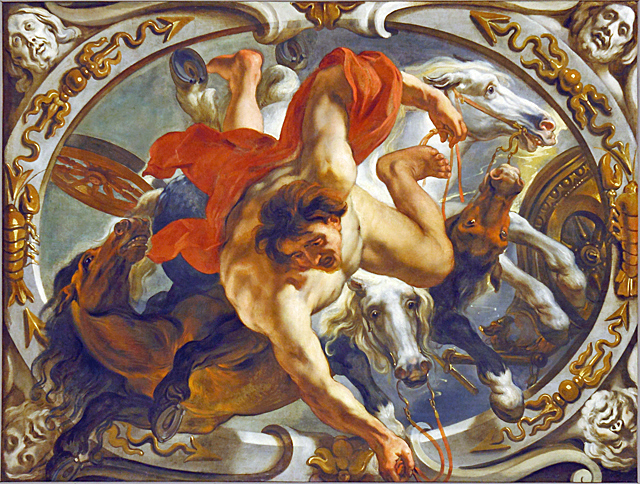
Cancer (June)

Apollo, the sun god, gives the reins of his chariot to his son young Phaethon. Phaethon's ride is disastrous, as he cannot keep a firm grip on the horses. As a result, he drives the chariot too close to the earth, burning it, and too far from it, freezing it. In the end, after many complaints, from the stars in the sky to the earth itself, Zeus strikes Phaethon with one of his lightning bolts, killing him instantly. His dead body then drops into the river Eridanus. Jordaens shows Phaethon at the moment of his fall. Having reached the highest point of its course, the sun enters the sign of Cancer, and appears to go backwards like Phaeton.

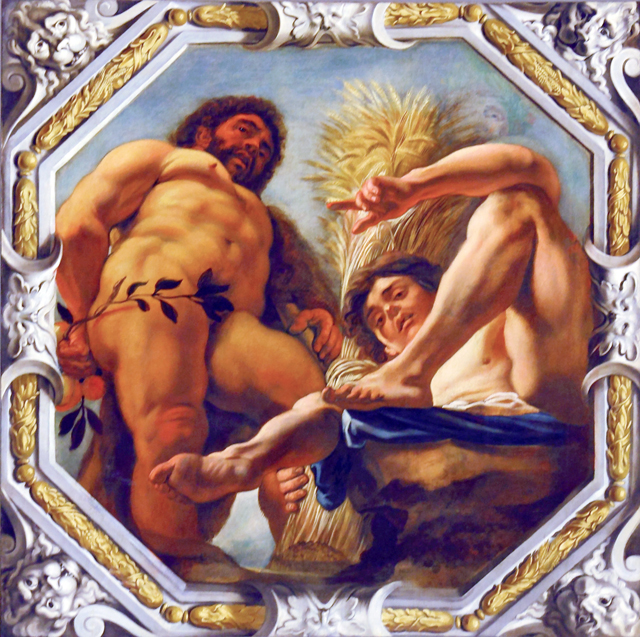
Leo (July)

The divine hero Hercules carries on his back the remains of the Nemean lion which he has defeated. His left hand is resting on his club while he holds in his left hand the golden apples from the Garden of the Hesperides which he had conquered. A young man holding a sheaf of wheat is seated next to him. The lion and the power of Hercules symbolize heat. In Antiquity, the lion, as an animal living in a hot climate, was dedicated to Vulcan, the god of fire. The young man holding a sheaf of wheat symbolizes that the harvest is over.

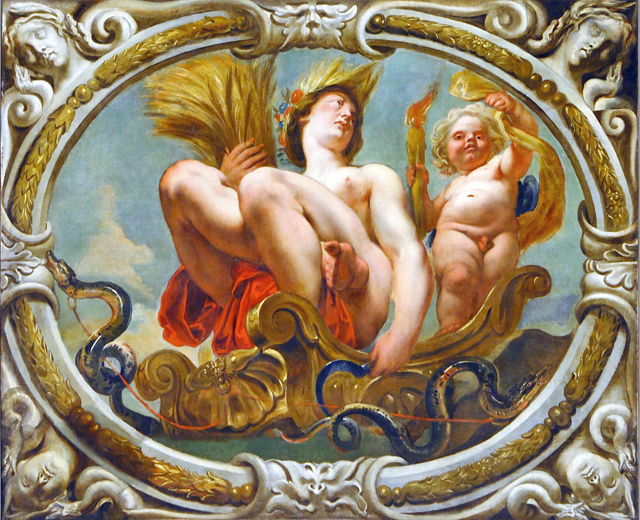
Virgo (August)

Ceres is sitting in her chariot pulled by snakes, her head crowned with ears of corn while she holds a sickle in one hand and a sheaf of wheat in the other,. The young Triptolemus, inventor of the plough, is at her side. He is holding the torch which Ceres used when she went out at night to look for Prosperina, her daughter, who had been kidnapped by Pluto. Ceres, goddess of the harvest, benefactress of the earth, returns to Mount Olympus after she has distributed all her gifts and completed the cycle of the year.
