= Jacob Jordaens =

Flemish painter (1593–1678)

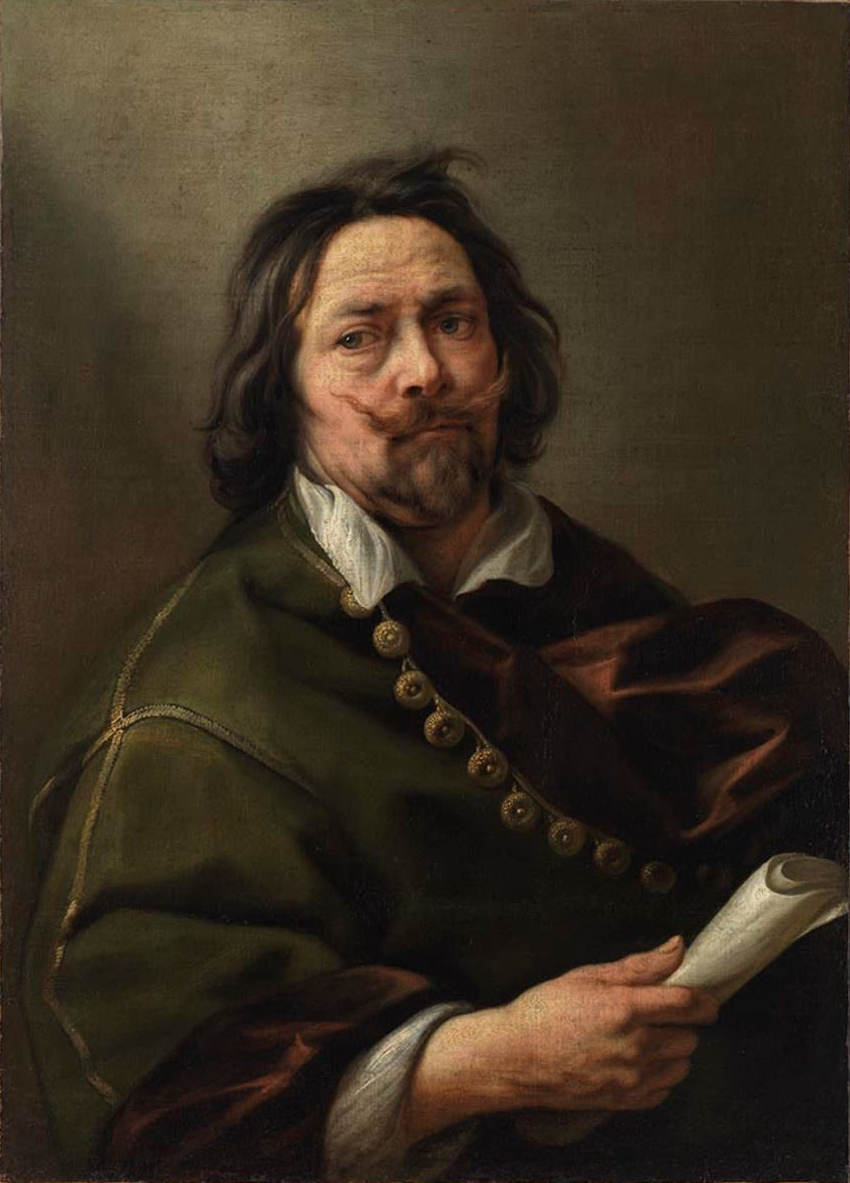
- Self-Portrait, c. 1650
- Born: 19 May 1593; Antwerp, Habsburg Netherlands
- Died: 18 October 1678 (aged 85); Antwerp, Habsburg Netherlands
- Known for: Painting, drawing and tapestry design
- Movement: Flemish Baroque

Jacques "Jacob" Jordaens (19 May 1593 – 18 October 1678) was a Flemish painter, draughtsman and a designer of tapestries and prints. He was a prolific artist who created biblical, mythological, and allegorical compositions, genre scenes, landscapes, illustrations of Flemish sayings and portraits. After the death of Rubens and Anthony van Dyck, he became the leading Flemish Baroque painter of his time. Unlike those illustrious contemporaries he never travelled abroad to study the Antique and Italian painting and, except for a few short trips to locations elsewhere in the Low Countries, he resided in Antwerp his entire life. He also remained largely indifferent to Rubens and van Dyck's intellectual and courtly aspirations. He expressed this attitude in his art by avoiding idealistic treatment of his subject in contrast to these contemporaries.

His principal patrons were the wealthy bourgeoisie and local churches. Only late in his career did he receive royal commissions, including from King Charles I of England, Queen Christina of Sweden and the stadtholder class of the Dutch Republic. As well as being a successful painter, he was a prominent designer of tapestries and prints.

While he is today mostly identified with his large-scale genre scenes such as The King Drinks (also called the Feast of the Bean King) and As the Old Sing, So Pipe the Young, his contemporary reputation was based as much on his numerous mythological, allegorical and biblical scenes. Often regarded as a pupil and epigone of Rubens, he was never recorded as a member of Rubens's workshop. He regularly worked as an independent collaborator of Rubens. The principal influence of Rubens on his work is the use of the chiaroscuro technique which Rubens himself had mastered through his study of Caravaggio's paintings during his stay in Italy. His main artistic influences, besides Rubens, were northern Italian painters such as Jacopo Bassano, Paolo Veronese, and Caravaggio.

== Life ==
=== Early years ===
Jacques Jordaens was born in Antwerp on 19 May 1593, the first of eleven children of the wealthy linen merchant Jacob Jordaens and Barbara van Wolschaten. Little is known about Jordaens's early education. It is likely that he received the advantages of the education usually enjoyed by children of his social class as is demonstrated by his clear handwriting, competence in French and thorough knowledge of mythology. His familiarity with biblical subjects is further evidenced in his many religious paintings. His personal interest in the Bible was illustrated by his later conversion from Catholicism to Protestantism.

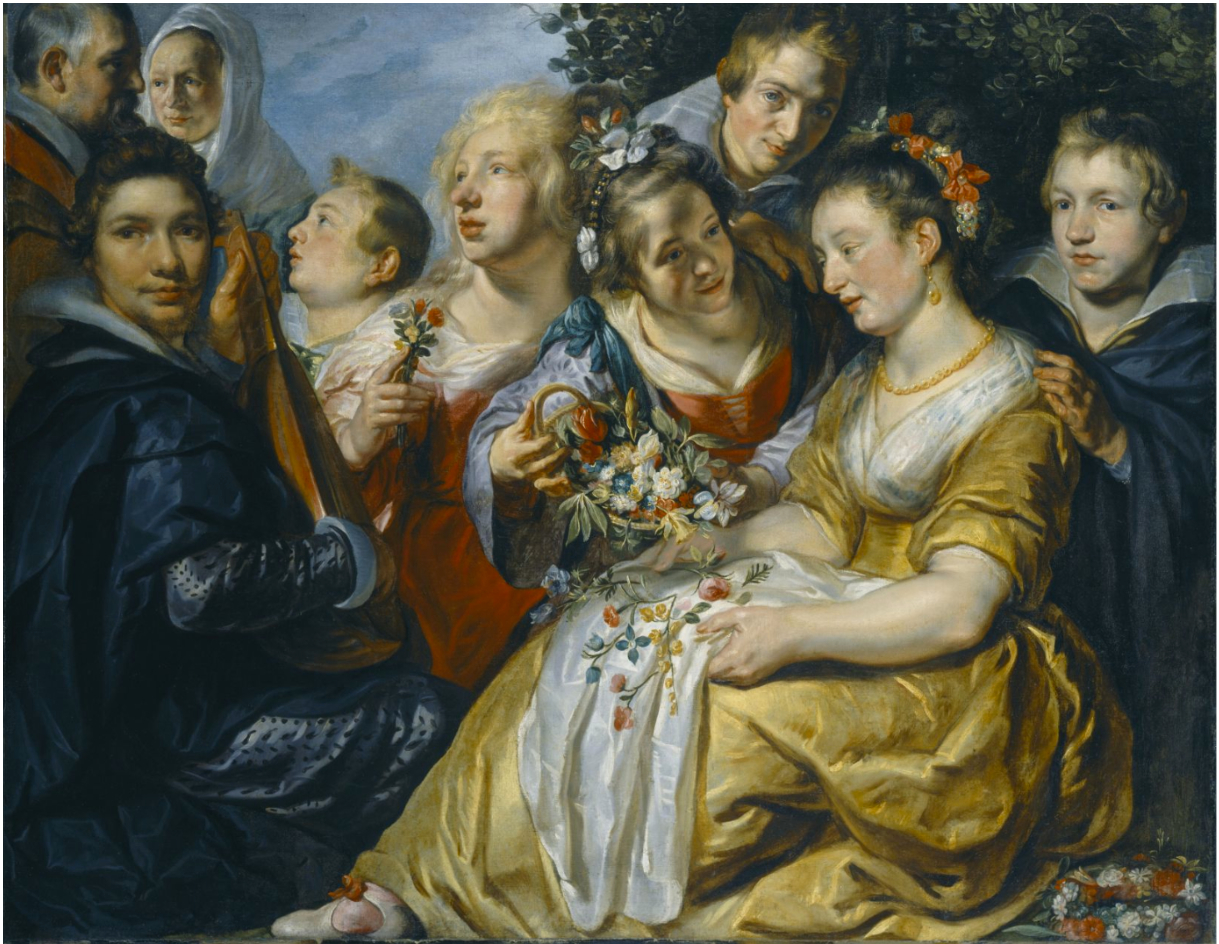
Self-portrait with the Family of His Father-in-Law Adam van Noort, 1616

Like Rubens, he studied under Adam van Noort, who was his only teacher. He was registered in the local Guild of Saint Luke as a pupil of van Noort in the year 1607. During his training,felis Jordaens lived in van Noort's house in the Everdijstraat where he became very close to the family. In 1615, after eight years of training with van Noort, he was accepted in the Antwerp Guild of Saint Luke as a master "waterscilder" ('water painter'). It has been inferred from this that Jordaens initially painted tempera canvases, which in the 17th century served as substitutes for tapestries or were used as tapestry cartoons. No examples of his earliest tempera works are extant. It is not clear whether Jordaens actually painted such works as his master van Noort was not known to create such works.

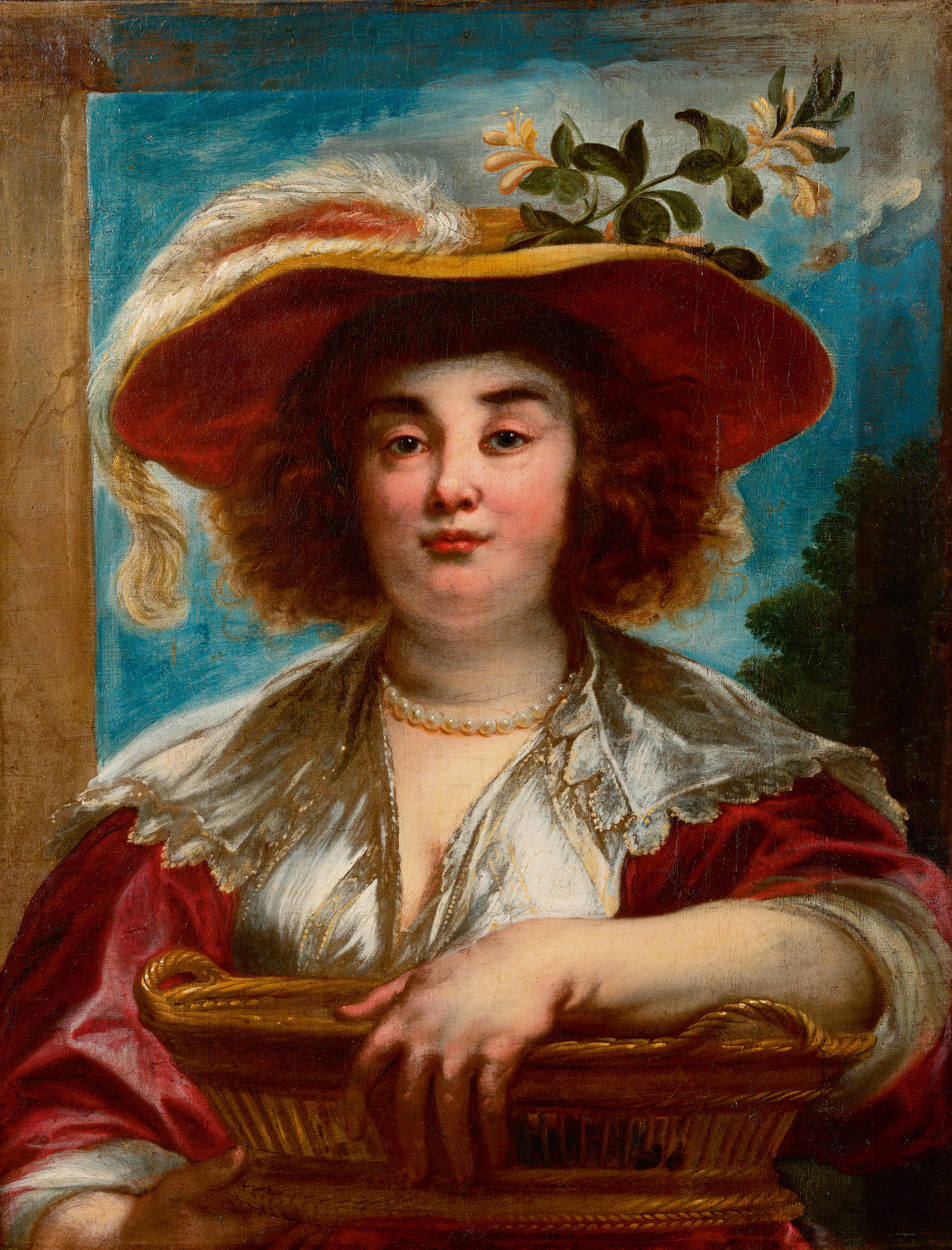
Portrait of the artist's eldest daughter Elisabeth

Jordaens never made the traditional trip to Italy to study classical and Italian art. On 15 May 1616, he married his master's eldest daughter, Catharina van Noort. The couple had three children, Elisabeth, Jacob, who became a painter, and Anna Catharina. The couple originally lived with or near Jordaens's father in law. In 1618, they bought two adjoining houses in the Hoogstraat, the street where Jordaens was born, but which were situated behind the house of the merchant Backx. His father in law later moved in with them. Jordaens became in 1616 a member of the 'Gilde van de Armenbus' (Guild of the Poor Box). This guild was a sort of insurance pool for artists with health problems. On 28 September 1621 he took on the position of dean of the Guild of Saint Luke. He accepted the position on condition that he would solely cover the expenses incurred during his tenure and not be responsible for the debts left by his predecessors. He held the position for only one year.

=== Career ===
Even before he was admitted as a master in the Guild he had started working for the free market. In the early period of his career he had contact with the workshop of Rubens in Antwerp and produced many mythological and allegorical compositions as well as biblical scenes. In 1628, he was, together with Rubens and van Dyck, commissioned by the Augustine order to each paint an altarpiece for the Augustine church in Antwerp. Rubens painted a Virgin and Child Adored by Saints for the high altar while van Dyck contributed a St. Augustine in Ecstasy for the altar on the left. Jordaens painted the Martyrdom of St. Apollonia for the altar on the right (still in situ). According to the legend of the martyrdom of St. Apollonia, the 3rd-century saint jumped into a fire rather than denounce her faith. Jordaens's treatment of the subject is crowded and dramatic. It was likely Rubens who had been able to secure this commission. That Jordaens was also invited to contribute to this project shows the high regard in which he was already held at that early period of his career.

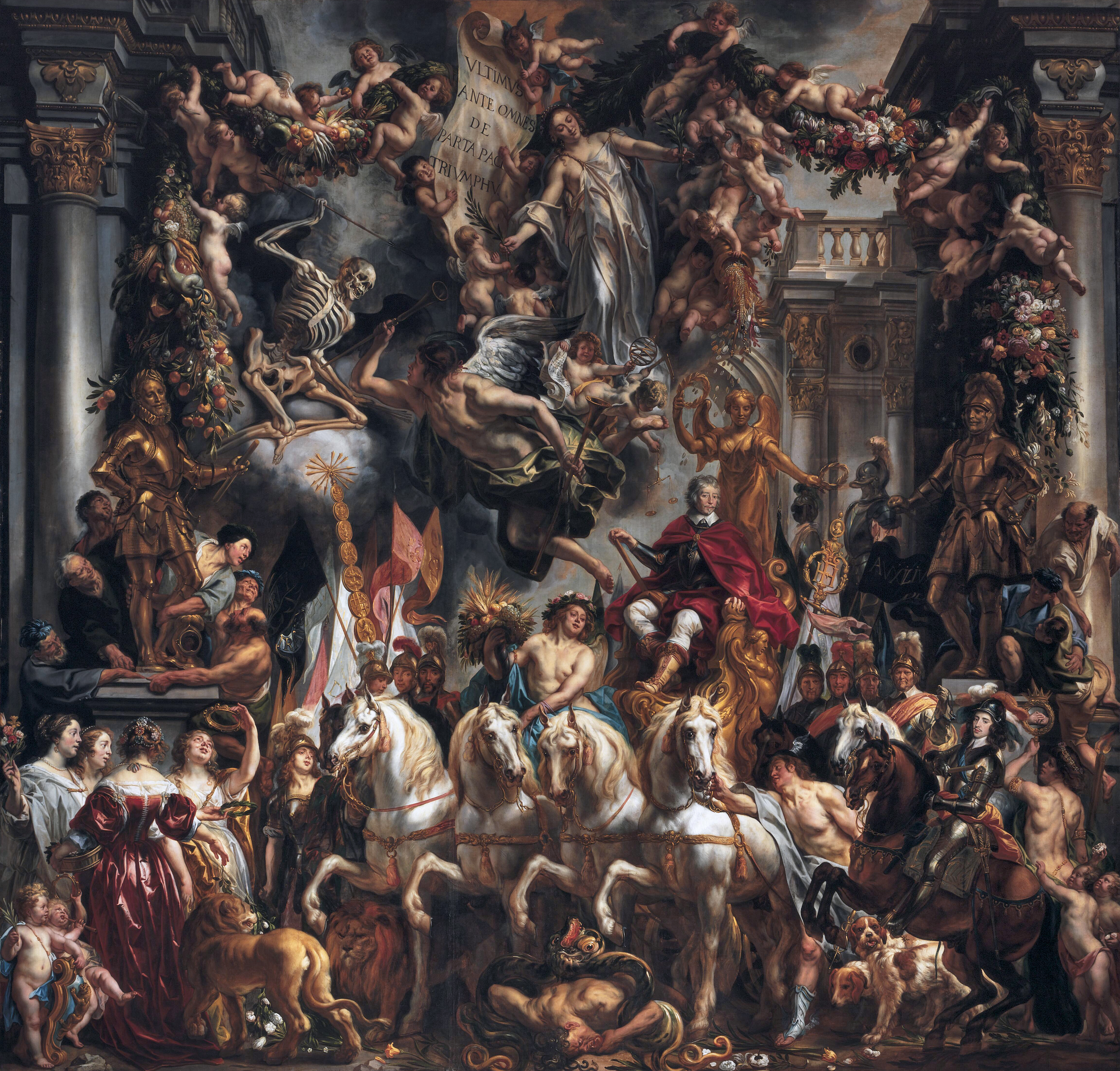
The Triumph of Frederick Henry, Prince of Orange

Jordaens was one of the artists invited to work on the decorations for the Joyous Entry into Antwerp in 1635 of the new governor of the Habsburg Netherlands Cardinal-Infante Ferdinand. Rubens was in overall charge of the design of this project. Jordaens'contribution consisted of a few decorative paintings made after designs by Rubens. In collaboration with Cornelis de Vos he completed the triumphal arch of Philip that was erected in the Huidenvetterstraat. It was one of the principal decorative elements in Rubens's designs. From top to bottom and on both sides, the triumphal arch was covered with paintings extolling the benefits which the Burgundian and Habsburg dynasties had brought to Antwerp. The work has not been preserved as it was solely intended as a temporary decoration for the Joyous Entryof the new governor.

Rubens received in 1636 from King Philip IV of Spain a commission for a series of mythological paintings to decorate the Torre de la Parada, a hunting lodge that was being built for the king near Madrid. The mythological scenes depicted in the series were largely based on the Metamorphoses of Ovid. Rubens realized this important commission with the assistance of a large number of Antwerp painters such as David Teniers the Younger, Cornelis de Vos, Jan Cossiers, Peter Snayers, Thomas Willeboirts Bosschaert, Theodoor van Thulden, Jan Boeckhorst, Peeter Symons, Jacob Peter Gowy and others, who worked after Rubens's modellos. Jordaens also played a part in this collaborative effort. Two works in the series attributed to Jordaens are Apollo and Pan (1637), made after a sketch by Rubens, and Vertummus and Pomona (1638). To Jordaens are further tentatively attributed the Fall of the Titans, the Marriage of Peleus and Thetis, and Cadmus Sowing the Dragons Teeth.

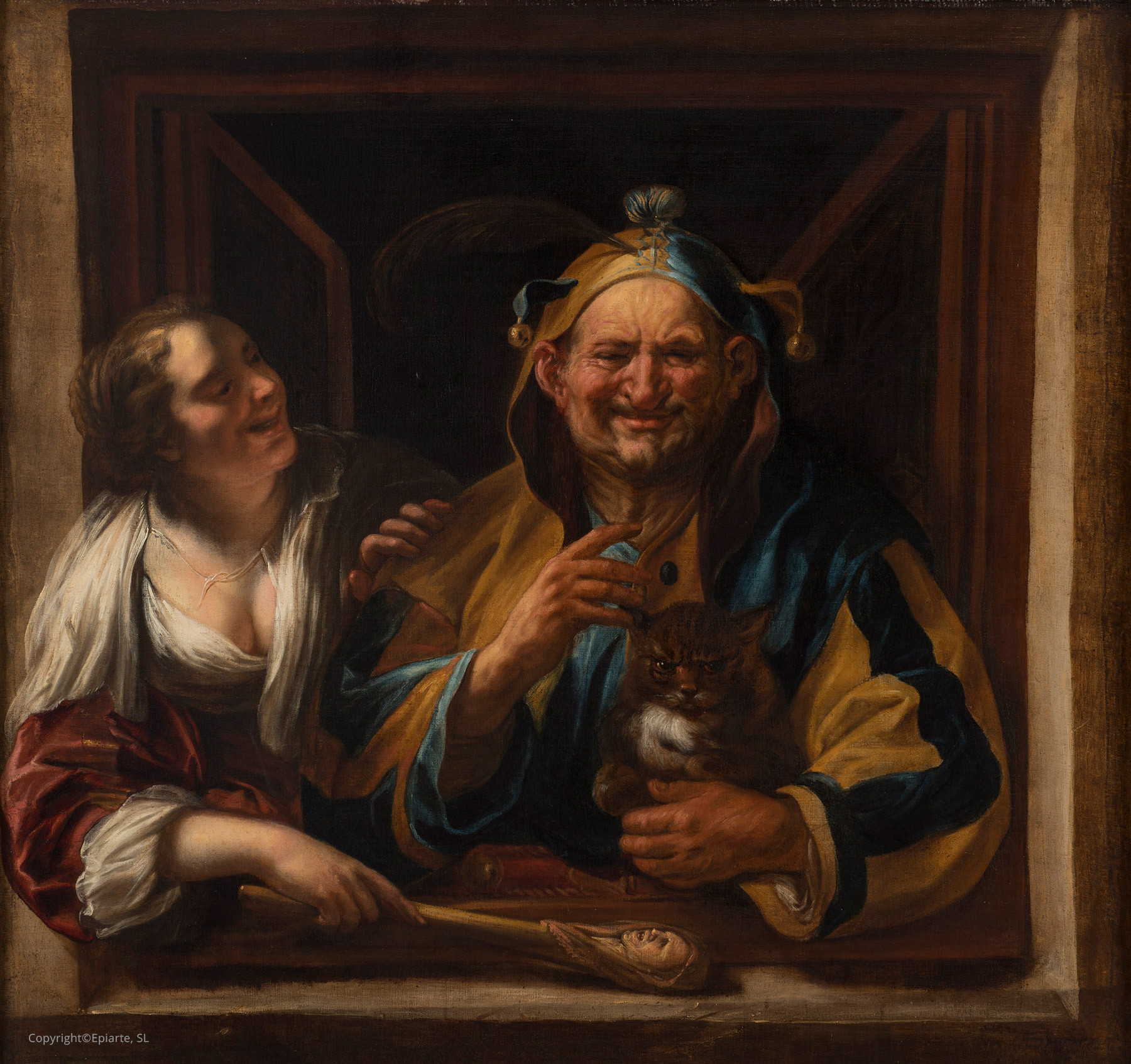
The Woman, the Fool and his Cat

=== Royal patronage ===
Sometime during the years 1639–40, Jordaens was commissioned through Balthazar Gerbier, the English King Charles's agent in Brussels, and Cesare Alessandro Scaglia, a diplomat residing in Antwerp, to create a set of 22 paintings illustrating The Story of Cupid and Psyche. Van Dyck's Cupid and Psyche may also be related to this commission. While the works were to be displayed in the Queen's House at Greenwich upon completion, the patron and final location were unknown to Jordaens at the time he received the commission. When Jordaens submitted his initial designs to his intermediaries between himself and the English court, Gerbier was still attempting to convince the King that Rubens was a better choice for a project requiring a thorough skill in foreshortening. His efforts failed when Rubens died on 30 May 1640. With Rubens's death, Jordaens was given the sole responsibility for the entire commission. Efforts to complete the project continued slowly until in May 1641 all plans for The Story of Cupid and Psyche series were disrupted with the death of the diplomat Scaglia. The project was never completed and only eight paintings were delivered to the English Court. A dispute with Scaglia's heirs over payment for seven of these works continued into the next generation.

He also received a commission from Ruben's heirs to finish a painting of Perseus and Andromeda commissioned by Philip IV of Spain. On 21 April 1648 he received a commission to produce 35 large ceiling paintings for Queen Christina of Sweden's castle in Uppsala, Sweden. It is not clear whether Jordaens ever completed this commission or if the works ever reached their destination.

In 1651 he received one of his final large commissions. Amalia van Solms, widow of the Dutch Stadtholder Prince Frederick Henry of Orange invited various artists to decorate the manorial house Huis ten Bosch in The Hague which was built in 1645. For the Orange hall in the manor, Jordaens painted the Triumph of Frederick Henry, Prince of Orange, a large allegorical painting of Prince Frederick Henry's military successes.

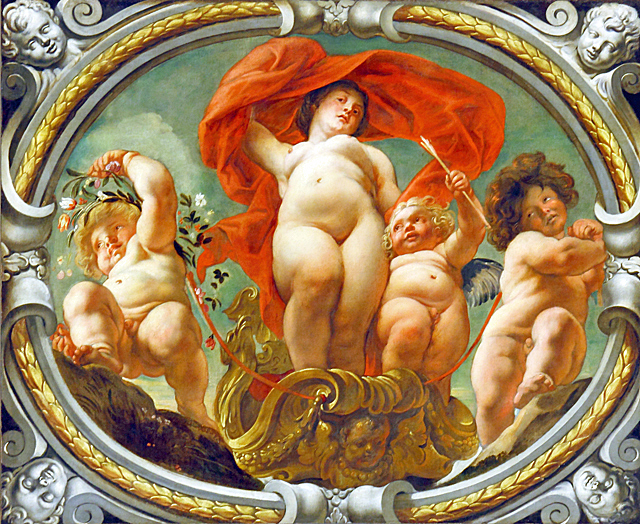
Gemini, from the series of The Signs of the Zodiac

In 1661, he was commissioned to paint large lunettes for the newly constructed Amsterdam Town Hall. Two of the lunettes deal with biblical subjects, (the David and Goliath and Samson defeats the Philistines) and two depict scenes from Dutch history (A Roman Camp under Attack by Night and Peace between the Romans and the Batavians).

=== A palatial residence in Antwerp ===
In 1633, his parents' estate was divided among himself, his brother Izaak and his sisters Anna, Magdalena and Elisabeth. From the estate he received his birth house "Het Paradijs". In 1634 he bought two more houses on the Verversrui. In 1639 Jordaens bought the large house "De Halle van Lier" or "Turnhoutsche Halle", at number 43 on the Hoogstraat, which was located in front of the houses in which he was then living. He had the three houses converted into a new large complex. He lived and worked there until his death in 1678. He designed the facades of the large inner court yard in the style of Rubens's house constructed two decades earlier. He decorated the house with sculptures, carpets and decorative furniture. For the two back rooms on the south he created ceiling paintings, including the series of The Signs of the Zodiac, twelve allegorical paintings of the signs of the Zodiac, painted around 1640. The series is now installed in the ceiling of the East Gallery of the Palais du Luxembourg in Paris.

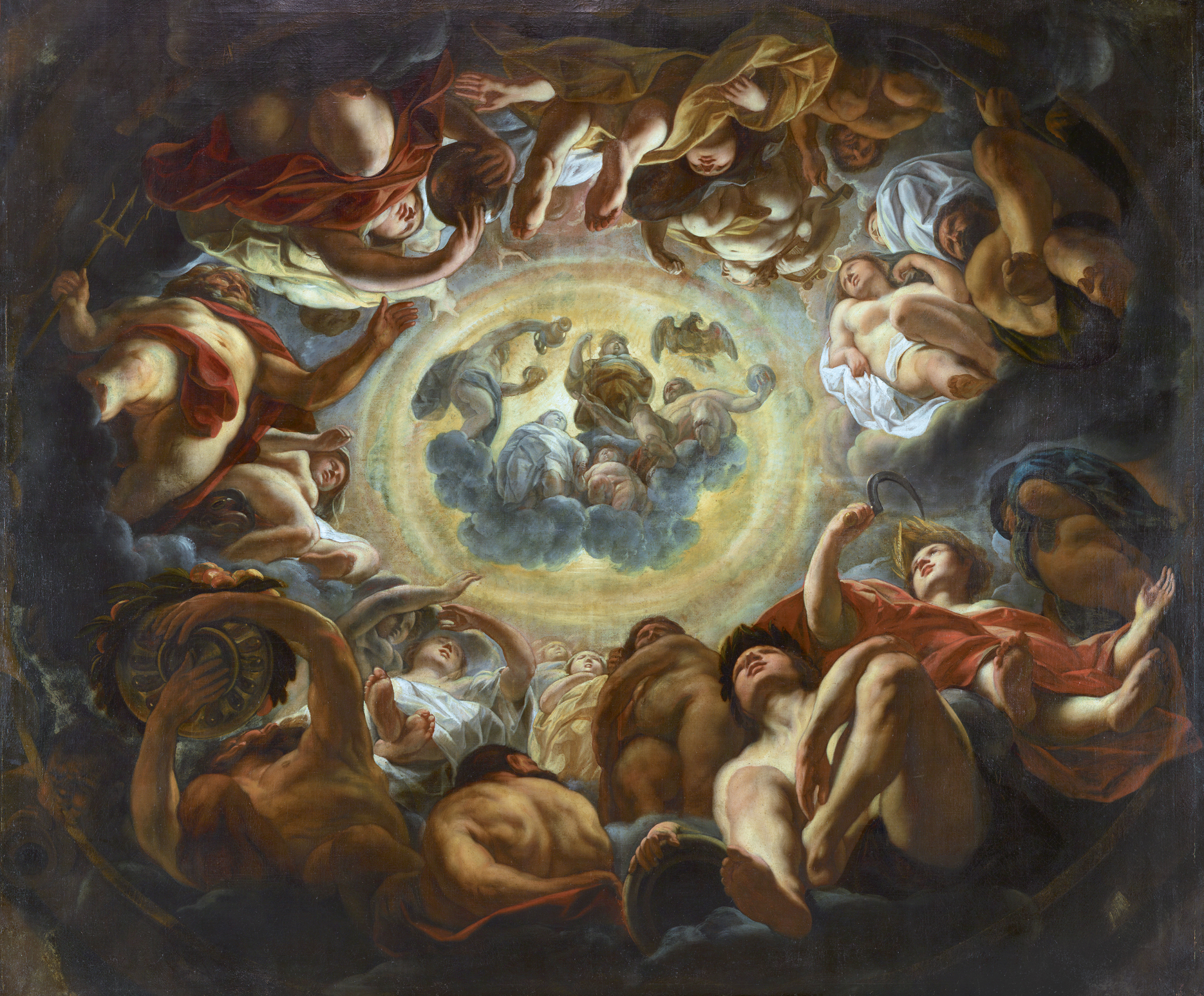
Psyche receives the cup of immortality on the Olympus

In 1652 he painted for his 'showroom' (pronkkamer) in the south wing of his home nine ceiling pieces depicting the erotic history of the god of love Cupid and the royal daughter Psyche. According to the inventory left by Jordaens's grandchildren, these paintings were part of the sale of the house in 1708. The walls and doors of the room were also covered with paintings. This was the room where Jordaens received his guests and clients. The decoration of the room was intended to impress his visitors by his mastery through the depiction of the mythological tale of earthly and heavenly love, betrayal and fidelity. As the paintings from the Story of Cupid and Psyche were mounted on the ceiling, Jordaens used a lot of foreshortening in the pictures to create the illusion of depth. The perspective system was borrowed verbatim from Rubens's ceiling pieces in the Jesuit church in Antwerp. The paintings are viewed through an octagonal 'aperture' frame. The canvas entitled Psyche receives the cup of immortality on the Olympus is the centrepiece of the series. Other paintings in the series are Psyche's Father Questions the Oracle in the Temple of Apollo, the Love of Cupid and Psyche, the Oracle of Apollo, the Curiosity of Psyche, Cupid's Flight, Psyche Received by the Gods and two putti pieces. The original ceiling and door paintings have survived and are now in the collection of The Phoebus Foundation in Antwerp. The paintings on the walls are lost but some of the designs for them have been preserved.

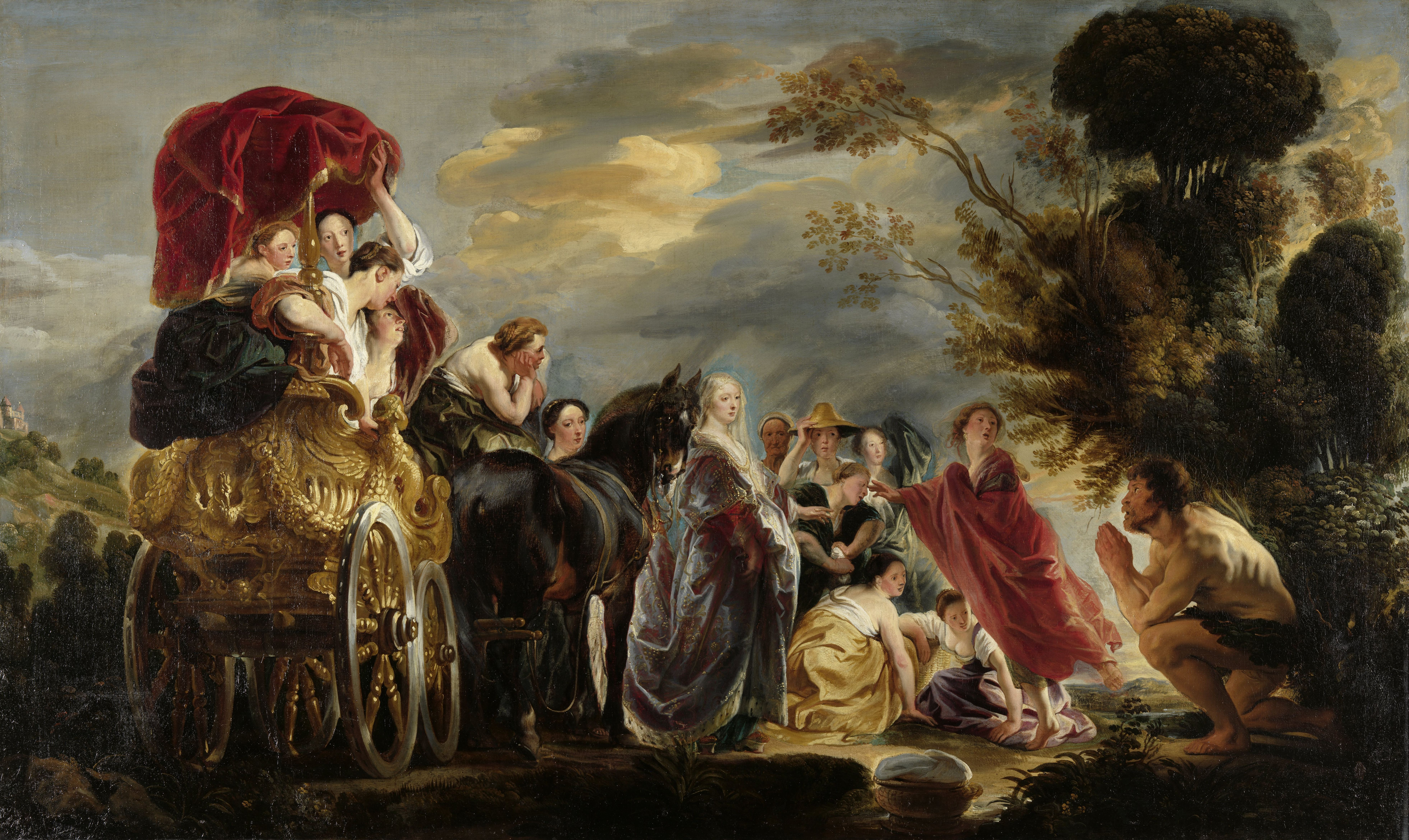
Meeting of Odysseus and Nausicaa

=== Religion ===
In Antwerp, which was ruled by Catholic Spanish monarchs, the Protestant religion was forbidden although it should have been tolerated under the terms of the 1648 Peace of Münster which officially recognised the Dutch Republic. Towards the end of his life, Jordaens converted to Calvinism. He, his wife and daughter Elisabeth were members of the Calvinist congregation that had been established in Antwerp after the Peace of Münster despite the continued repression of Protestantism in the Habsburg Netherlands. His daughter Anna Catharina was likely also a member as she married a Jansenist. His religious affiliation did not stop him from accepting commissions to decorate Catholic churches. The schout of Antwerp fined Jordaens between 1651 and 1658 an amount of 200 pounds and 15 shillings for his 'scandalous' (i.e. heretical) writings.

=== Death and burial ===
In October 1678, Jordaens died of the mysterious sweating sickness ('zweetziekte' or 'polderkoorts' in Dutch), which, on the same day, also killed his unmarried daughter Elisabeth, who was living with him. They were buried together under one tombstone in the Protestant cemetery in Putte, a village just north of the Belgian border, where his wife Catharina had been put to rest upon her death in 1659.

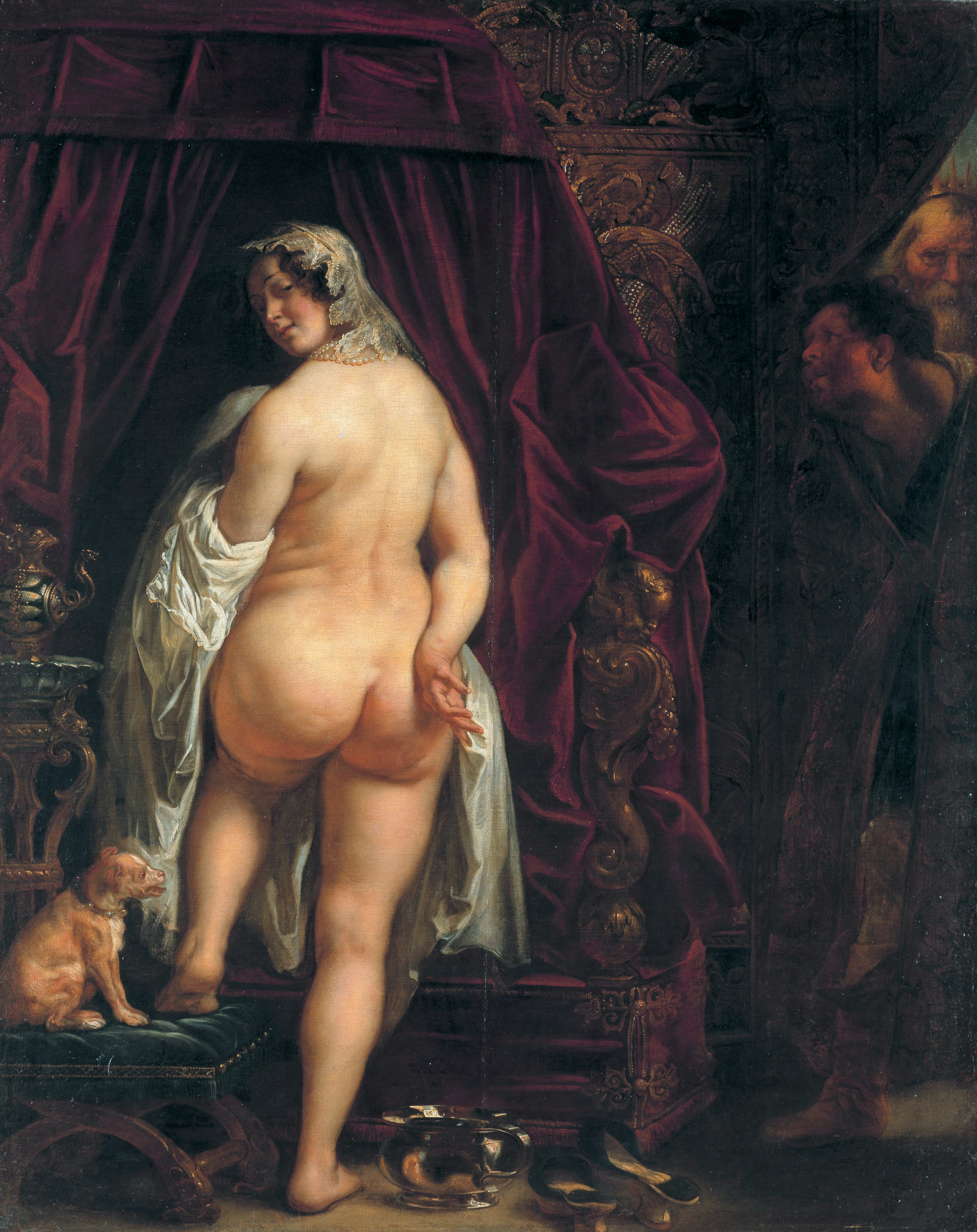
Candaules Showing His Wife to Gyges

One year after his death, Jordaens's son-in-law donated twenty-five Flemish pounds to the Camer van den Huysarmen ('Chamber of the Almoners') in Antwerp. He also donated Jordaens's painting The Washing and Anointing of the Body of Christ to the Maagdenhuis, an orphanage for girls in Antwerp. Apparently, these gifts were made in execution of instructions which Jacques Jordaens, who died intestate, had left behind. During his lifetime the kindness of Jordaens was recognized by those who knew him as is attested by various surviving documents.

The grandchildren of Jordaens moved to the Dutch Republic.

=== Workshop practice ===
Jordaens managed a large workshop as is attested by the large number of pupils that trained with him. A position in Jordaens's studio was highly desirable for young artists. The Guild records show he trained fifteen pupils between 1621 and 1667, the most famous of whom was Jan Boeckhorst. Six other persons are referred to as his pupils in court documents while they do not appear in the Guild records. It is therefore probable that he had more students than those recorded in the Guild records. Among his pupils were his son Jacob and his cousin Arnoldus Jordaens. Through his international reputation Jordaens attracted foreign artists to his studio as his pupils. After 1642 the Polish artist Aleksander Jan Tricius became his pupil and in 1645 Queen Christina of Sweden intended to send her protégé Georg Waldau (Joris Waldon) to his workshop, but this plan came to nothing due to the threat of war in Flanders.

Like Rubens and other artists at that time, Jordaens's workshop relied on assistants and pupils in the production of his paintings. Not many of these pupils went on to achieve fame themselves. His workshop practices occasionally caused him trouble. In 1648 one of his patrons, Martinus van Langenhoven, accused him of having sold him inauthentic paintings. Jordaens defended himself against the accusation with the argument that he had personally put the finishing touches on works executed by assistants in his workshop.

== Work ==
=== General ===
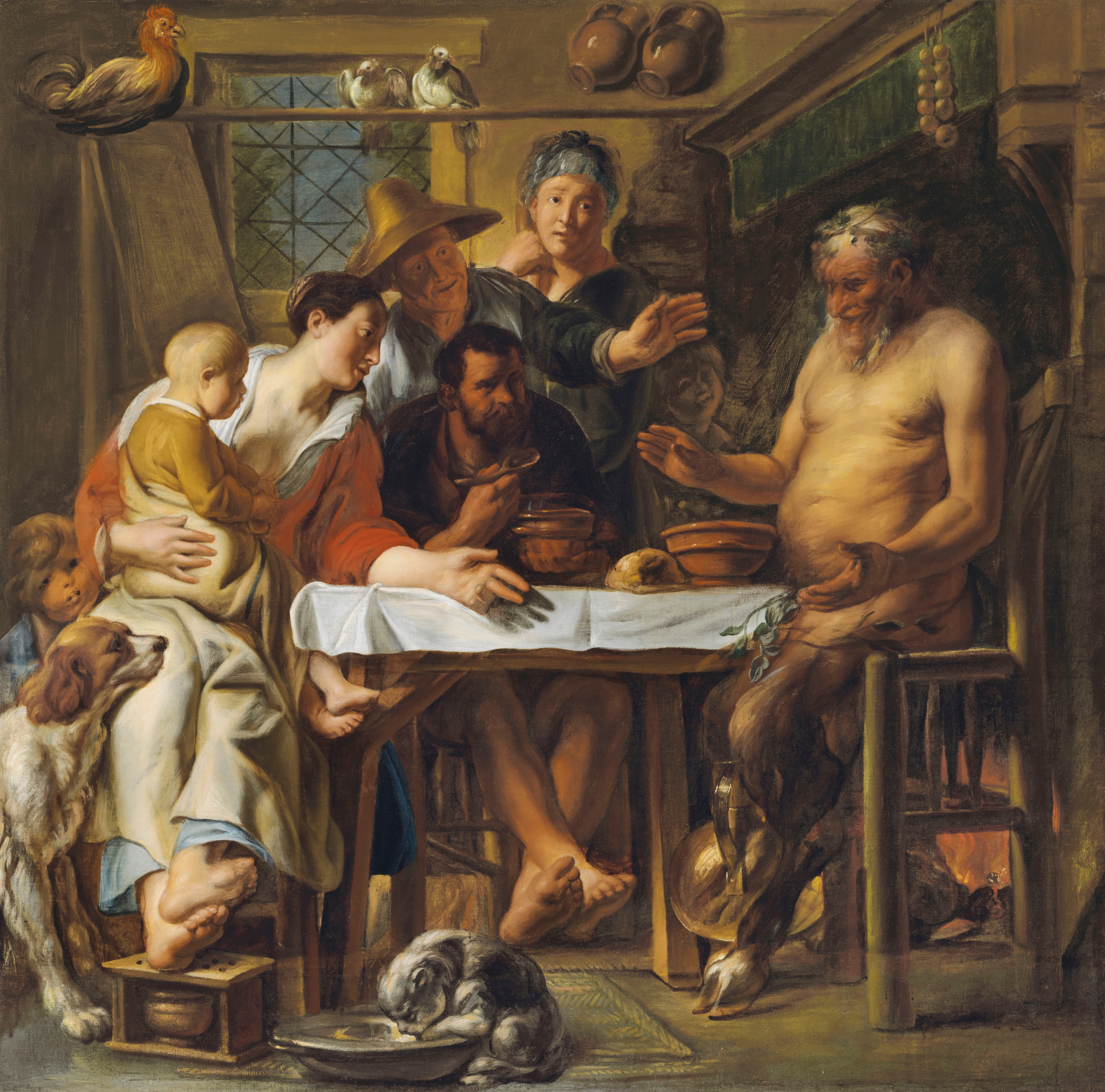
The Satyr and the Peasant, c. 1650, at Christie's

Jordaens was a very prolific painter, draftsman and designer of tapestries and prints who left a large oeuvre. He worked primarily, though not exclusively, for the rich Antwerp bourgeoisie. He received also a few commissions from aristocratic patrons. The many commissions, also from church patrons, he received after becoming the leading Flemish painter following Rubens's death resulted in a decline in the quality of his output due to an increased reliance on workshop assistance. Jordaens's paintings are populated with many figures, even though he lacked compositional talent. He combined high art with folk culture related elements. The popular tone of his genre painting sometimes borders on the caricature as he depicts his personages acting in a very effusive manner. His art has often been regarded as less idealized than that of Rubens and van Dyck. Nevertheless, it is now known that even though he did not read Latin or Greek and was thus unable to access the classical sources in their original language, he did rely on his knowledge of French to read classical literature in French translations. It is, for instance, known that for his Marsyas ill-treated by the Muses (on display at the Mauritshuis, The Hague), Jordaens relied on a French translation of the Eikones (Images) by Greek author Philostratus. This author of the third century A.D. wrote descriptions of 65 paintings which he had seen in a picture gallery in Naples. Jordaens's painting of Marsyas illustrates the painting entitled "Pan" in the Eikones.

An example of this combination of high art and populist tendencies is shown in his multiple versions of the fable of The Satyr and the Peasant. Based on the fable of the Satyr and the Peasant from Aesop's Fables, Jordaens used the fable to combine two of the painting genres in which he excelled: mythological painting and the peasant genre. His various interpretations of the subject and the many repetitions of these works by his workshop and followers popularized the theme which was then taken up by Flemish and Dutch painters such as Jan Cossiers and Jan Steen.

=== Influence of Rubens ===
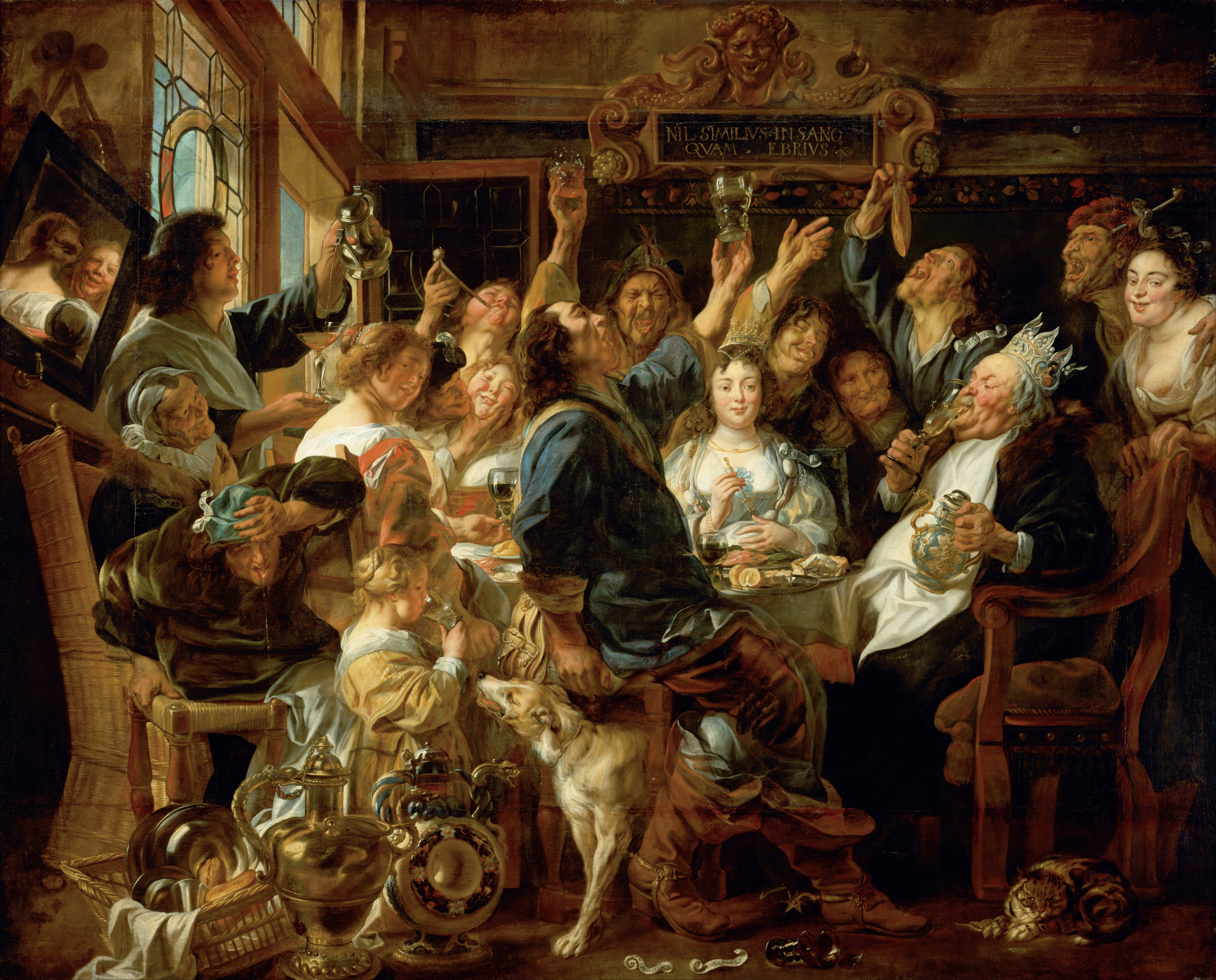
The King Drinks, 1640-1645, Kunsthistorisches Museum in Vienna

Jordaens was greatly influenced by Rubens who occasionally employed him to reproduce his designs in a larger format. After the death of Rubens, Jordaens advanced to the position of one of the most prominent painters in Antwerp. Like Rubens, Jordaens relied on a warm palette, naturalism, and a mastery of chiaroscuro and tenebrism. Jordaens excelled in representations of the base character of humanity. His classically inspired peasant themes and large-scale moralistic genre scenes influenced Jan Steen. Although Jacques Jordaens did not specialize, he often repeated a theme based on a proverb that depicted a wide range of characters of a variety of ages, crowded in a festive scene around a banquet table. These humorous pieces have a sense of coarseness. While Jordaens drew upon Rubens's motifs throughout his career, his work is distinguished by its greater realism, a crowding of the surface of his compositions and a preference for the burlesque, even within the context of religious and mythological subjects.

In the final years of his career between 1652 and 1678 his creative and artistic abilities declined. He abandoned vibrant colours in favour of a grey-blue palette, accented at times with a dull brown and applied paint so thinly that the canvas could be seen. However, there were some exceptions to this such as the religious paintings he produced after he had converted to Protestantism and the Story of Cupid and Psyche that he created for his own house.

=== Subjects ===
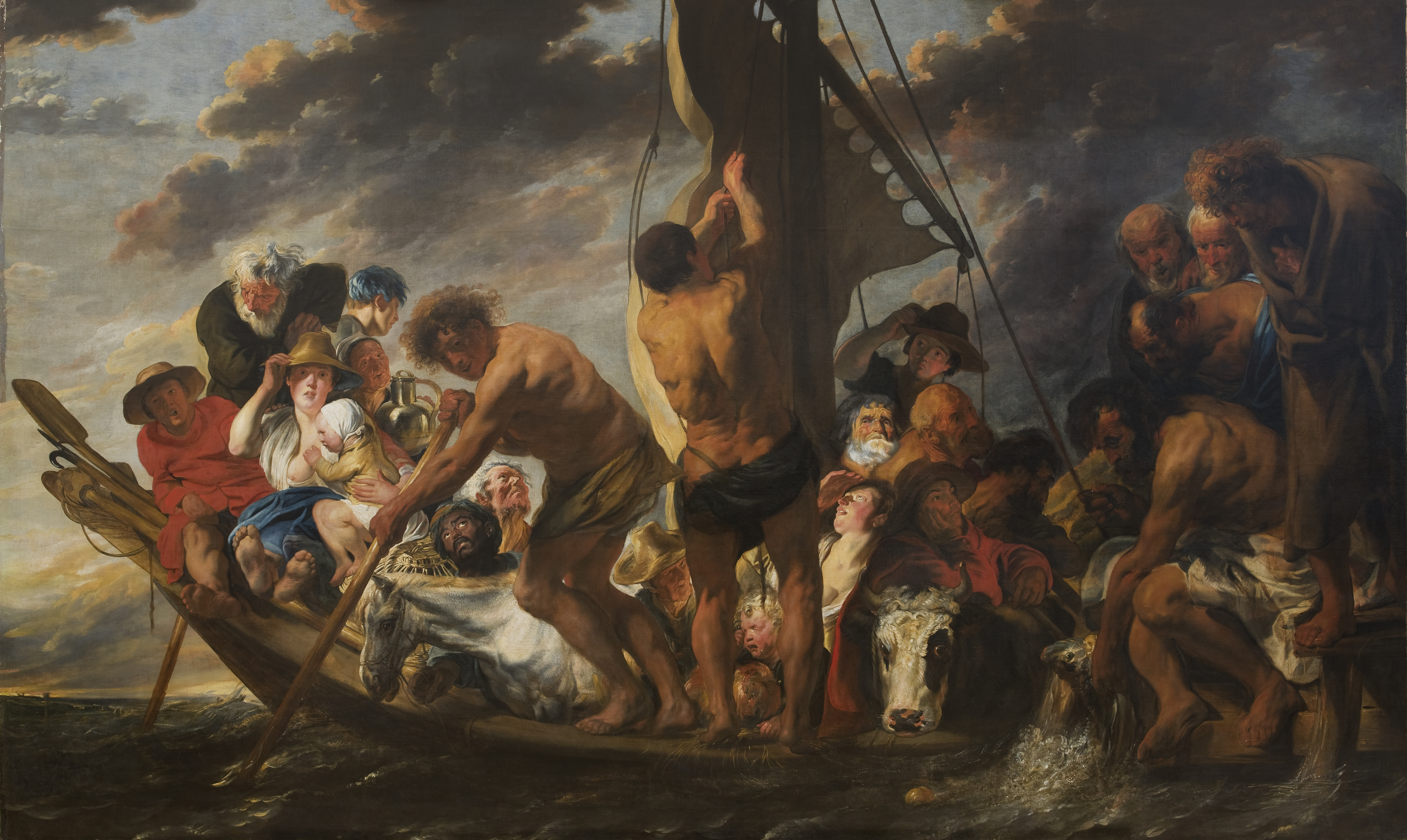
The Tribute Money, National Gallery of Denmark

In addition to being a well-known portrait painter, Jordaens painted biblical, mythological and allegorical subjects and landscapes and even etched a number of plates. Although primarily a history painter, he also painted illustrations of Flemish proverbs, such as As the Old Sing, So the Young Pipe, and depictions of Flemish festivals, for example The King Drinks, also called The Feast of the Bean King. Several of his works hint at a passion for animal painting. He often included a variety of animals, most likely drawn from life, including cows, horses, poultry, cats, dogs, and sheep. His life drawings of both animals and people were used and referenced throughout his life.

Throughout his career Jordaens had a penchant for returning to the same subjects resulting in various works reprising the same subject, sometimes in almost identical copies and in other instances as reworkings of the subject matter. Examples are the multiple versions of the fable of The Satyr and the Peasant discussed above and the multiple versions of the story of Mercury and Argus, the earliest version of which was painted circa 1620 (Museum of Fine Arts of Lyon). As a devout Christian he also painted various versions of the Adoration of the Shepherds of which he painted at least 7 versions. In the latter subject he usually grouped half-length figures closely together and cropped the scene so that the viewer would focus all attention on the figures. This compositional approach sought to intensify the narrative and accentuate the characters' expression.

=== As the Old Sing, So the Young Pipe ===
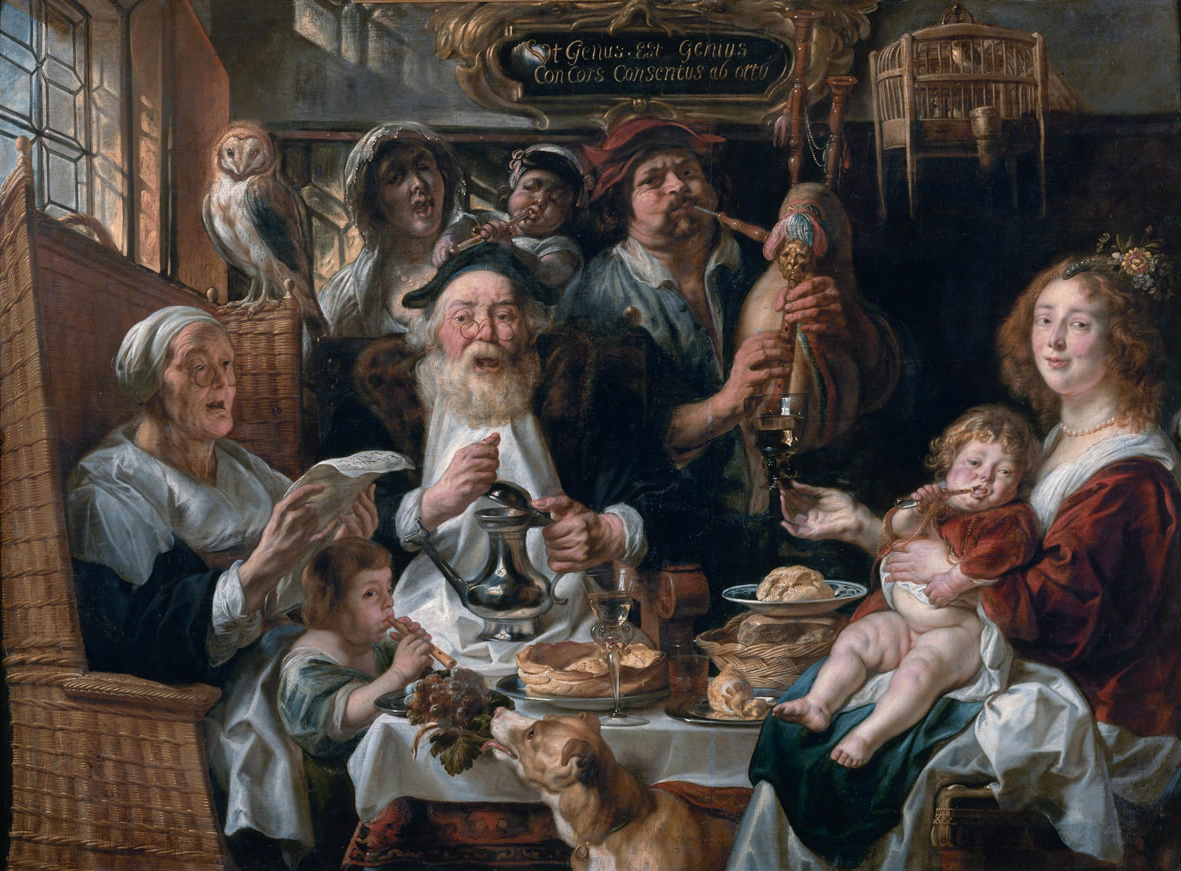
As the Old Sang, So the Young Pipe

As the Old Sang, So the Young Pipe (c. 1638–1640) is considered a companion to The King Drinks (also called The Feast of the Bean King) (Louvre, Paris). Both paintings are of a moralizing nature, have near identical measurements, and related styles. As the Old Sang, So the Young Pipe shows three generations of wealthy Antwerp burghers sitting around a table making music. Being a popular theme among Jordaens and his clients, several versions of this painting were created. In the version shown, Jordaens's father-in-law Adam van Noort is depicted as the old man. In this popular painting genre, elderly and middle-aged figures are always portrayed singing and creating music, as children "pipe" along.

The title is based on a popular proverb from the book Spiegel van den Ouden ende Nieuwen Tijdt, an Emblem book by Jacob Cats published in 1632. The Dutch proverb is Zo de ouden zongen, zo piepen de jongen, referring to the habit of birds to echo the pipe, or peeping chirp of their parents. Cats, a Calvinist, translated the proverb into a moralizing message; parents must be mindful of their actions and words, because children will copy their elders. The Dutch word for peep is just as in English, very close to the word pipe, and in this version, the bagpipe and flute pipe are used, but in some versions, the children are portrayed smoking a pipe, which even in those days was considered unhealthy for children.

Jan Steen also used a bagpipe and flute in his paintings on the same subject from around 1668 and 1670, even depicting the poem by Cats in the former of the two scenes. In his paintings however, Jordaens conveys this moralizing message as well as the idea that younger generations succeed their elders. The owl, considered the bird of the night, perched on the older woman's wicker chair, serves as a memento mori, a reminder of mortality.

=== Prometheus ===
Jordaens's 1640 painting Prometheus (depiction of the mythological tale of the titan Prometheus who had his liver pecked out by an eagle each day only to regenerate and begin the cycle anew the next day. Prometheus was punished for his audacity by Zeus for having given fire to man, not just in its physical form, but also in the fire of reason, which can be related to man's creativity in arts and sciences. Jordaens's depiction is very much likened to Rubens's Prometheus Bound. Jordaens's positioning of the eagle, the backwards, heroically nude bloodshot-eyed Prometheus as well as the depiction of the punishment and pain through spastic twisting and contorted movements, are also common themes in Rubens's version.

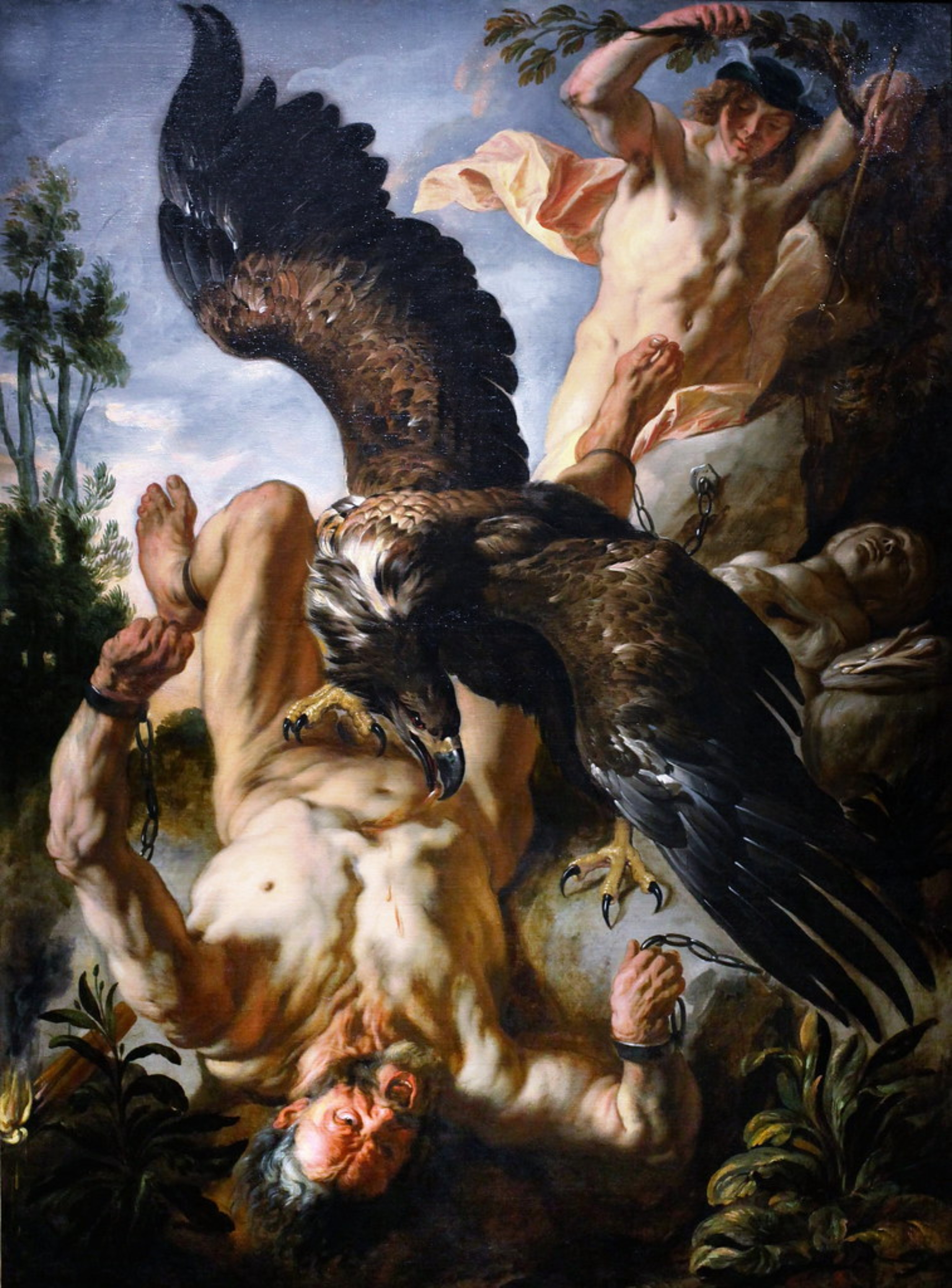
Prometheus (1640), Cologne

In contrast with Rubens's version, Jordaens's inclusion in the work of the god Hermes arguable holds out the hope of release from the punishment as in certain versions of the mythological story, Hermes helps Prometheus gain freedom. Still, in the Prometheus Bound attributed to Aeschylus, Hermes treats Prometheus badly, which would undermine this optimistic interpretation. The depiction of the sacks of bones (used in another part of the myth to deceive Zeus) and a clay statue (which represents his creation of man) are also not part of Rubens's composition. Another notable difference is the look of pure agony in Jordaens's Prometheus while Rubens relies on the contortions of the body to convey the same feeling. Jordaens's Prometheus is a facial study, a prevalent subject found in the paintings of Jordaens and other artists of the period.

== Tapestry designs ==
Jacques Jordaens's most significant body of work were the numerous designs he did for tapestries. As the most lucrative of the arts, tapestries were considered precious throughout the Renaissance and Baroque periods. These large wall hangings had begun to appear on the walls of wealthy European nobility in the fourteenth century. Following the success of the Brussels tapestries woven after the Raphael Cartoons, 16th and 17th-century patrons employed artists as tapestry designs; Jacques Jordaens, Peter Paul Rubens and Pietro Cortona flattered patrons allegorically in a manner that would identify them with famous historical or mythological figures, as a form of aristocratic self-promotion.

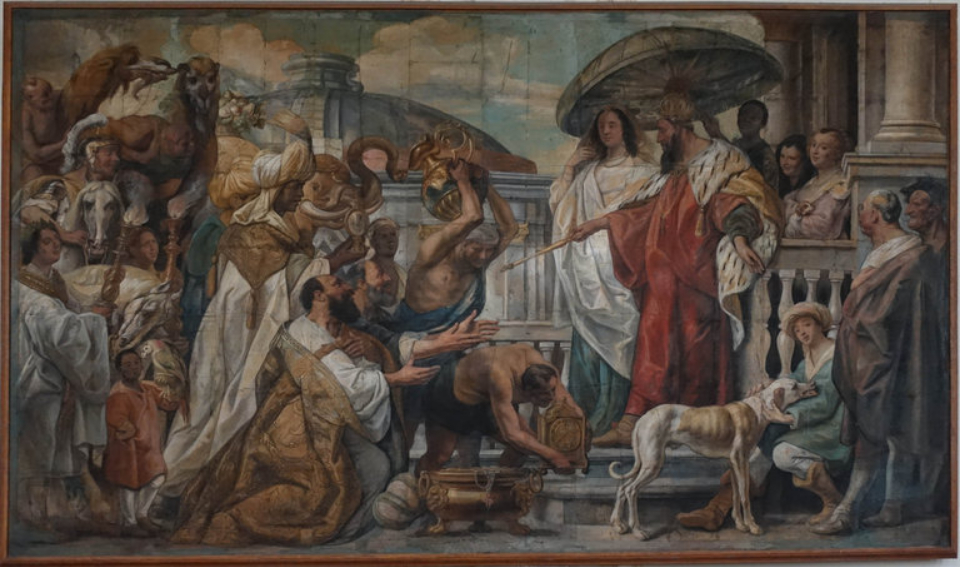
Tribute of the Caliph Harun al-Rashid to Charlemagne, tapestry design

Jordaens was successful in the tapestry ventures. His perfected techniques and style earned him numerous commissions for the design of tapestry series. He was regarded as one of the leading tapestry designers of the era.

Jordaens's process of tapestry creation included a preliminary drawing or sketch of the design. The design then is transferred to larger, more detailed oil sketch for the full-scale cartoon, which the weavers work from directly in weaving tapestry. Jordaens began planning a tapestry by executing a preparatory drawing coloured with water-soluble pigments. Although Jordaens did some sketches in oil, most were executed on paper or, later in his career, directly on canvas. Jordaens's tapestries were made for the aristocracy who placed such high value on them they would carry them with them while they travelled or went on military campaigns as a symbol of their status. Jordaens's scope of artistic representation was diverse, ranging from mythology, country life, to the history of Charlemagne. It has been noted that Jordaens's tapestry design incorporated densely organized crowds of figures, packed into a flat two-dimensional picture plane emphasizing surface patterns which resulted in a "woven picture". Just as he liked to crowd his genre paintings he carried forward to his tapestries.

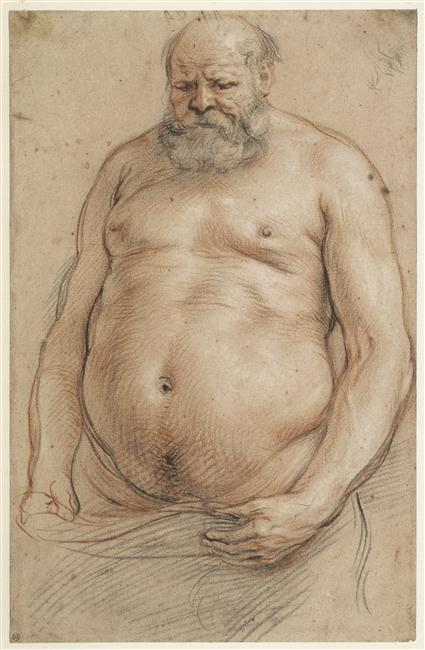
Naked old man, standing

== Drawings ==
Maintaining trends in Flemish painting, Jordaens was a proponent of extending Rubens's and Van Dyck's "painterly" style of art to his exceptionally prolific body of preparatory drawings. Today, approximately 450 drawings are attributed to Jordaens. There is continuing scholarly debate on the accuracy of attributions of Flemish drawings to either Jordaens or Rubens, due to their similar style and oeuvre. Jordaens and his contemporaries were proponents of the Flemish trend towards making, expanding, and modifying preparatory drafts for larger paintings or to add to their visual vocabulary the classical artistic ideals. As a painter-draftsman, Jordaens often employed gouache and washes to his preparatory drawings.

Rubens had pioneered the trois crayons drawing technique, to achieve a naturalistic effect by using the colors black, red and white. He used this technique often in his portraits. While Jordaens relied on black chalk studies in his early career he later also adopted the trois crayons technique in his drawings from life. Jordaens was very thrifty with his paper and often reused pieces of paper. He often enlarged a drawing at once or later by transferring it to a larger sheet or adding strips of paper.

== Prints ==
Jordaens was also engaged in the print publishing business as an organiser and designer of prints. Like Rubens and van Dyck before him, he realised the important role the print medium could play in distributing his work and raising his international fame. This was particularly the case as he was working in Antwerp, one of the most important printing centres of Europe at the time.

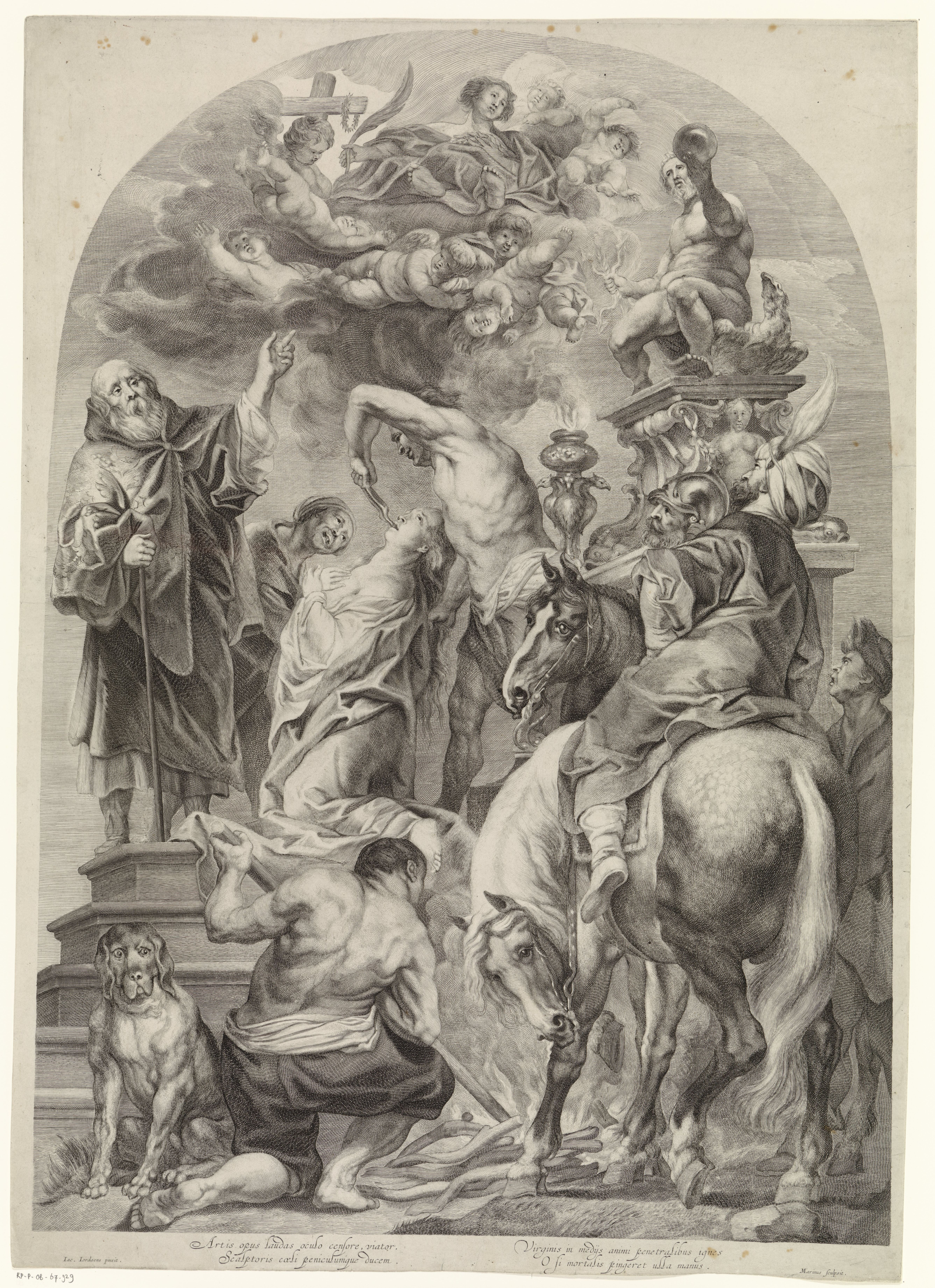
Heracles and Cacus

About 34 prints made or designed by Jordaens are currently known. The first print published after a design by Jordaens may have been The Satyr and the Peasant engraved by Lucas Vorsterman the Elder, a prominent printmaker who had been Rubens's dedicated engraver. The print was made after Jordaens's painting of the same name which is dated to about 1621 and is now in the Goteborg Museum. Although Vorsterman likely took the initiative to make the print, Jordaens is believed to have assisted in its production.

An important portion of prints made after Jordaens's designs were produced on his own initiative between c. 1635 and c. 1645. No painting or drawing connected with any of the 14 engravings in this group can be securely dated after 1645. They were engraved by a number of engravers active in Antwerp including Marinus Robyn van der Goes, Schelte a Bolswert, Paulus Pontius, Jacob Neefs, Pieter de Jode II and Nicolaes Lauwers. Almost all of the prints carry in the lower margin below the image, the name of Jordaens as inventor to the left and the name of the engraver to the right, the Latin words 'cum privilegio' in the centre, and a short explanation of the image in Latin verse. An additional group of six prints was published with publishers other than Jordaens. Jordaens designed a few of these prints at the request of the publisher Martinus van den Enden. This is the case with the Christ before Caiaphas engraved by Marinus Robyn van der Goes and the Christ before Pilate by Jacob Neefs. Pieter de Jode II's The Fool, the Woman and the Owl and Alexander Voet the Elder's Old Fool with a Cat were likely published without personal interference by Jordaens. Another print by Pieter de Jode II, a reproduction of a self-portrait by Jordaens was engraved for Joannes Meyssens's Images des diverses hommes, a publication with engraved portraits of many famous men published in 1649. Hendrick Snyers reproduced Jordaens's portrait of his father in law Adam van Noort for the same publication.

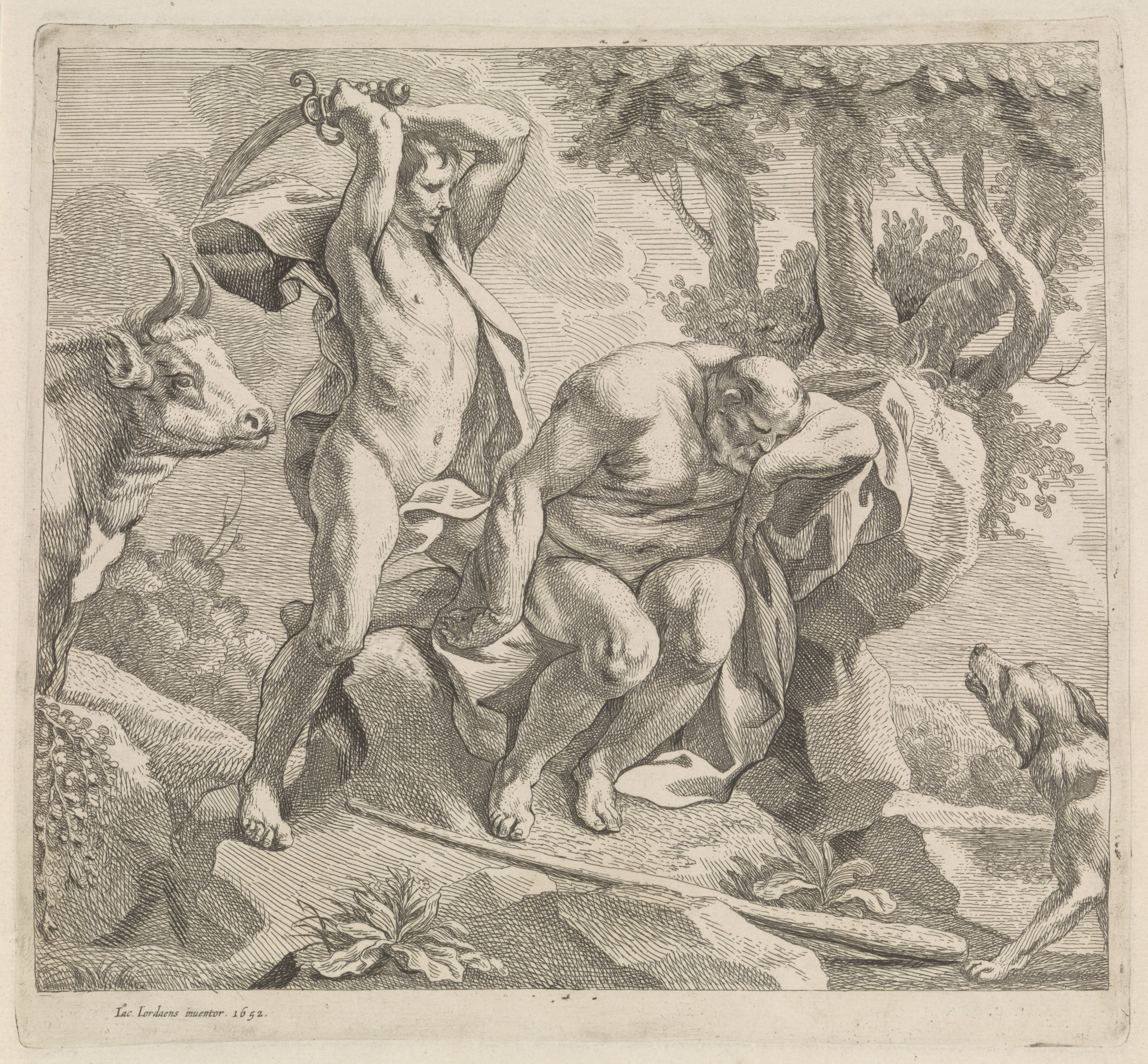
Mercury and Argus

Some art historians have conjectured that seven etchings made after paintings by Jordaens had been etched by Jordaens himself as the early impressions of these prints only carry the inscription ‘Iac. Iordaens inventor 1652’ without a reference to the engraver. It has recently been suggested that these prints are more likely to be the work of the Antwerp printmaker Remoldus Eynhoudt who had trained under the same master as Jordaens. The grounds for the revised attribution is that the said prints do not show the typical features of Jordaens's style as displayed in his paintings and drawings but rather exhibit the characteristics and weaknesses of Eynhoudt's known oeuvre. They were undoubtedly produced in 1652, as the inscriptions state. A majority of them are related to painted or drawn compositions of Jordaens dating to the late 1640s or around 1650 such as the print Mercury and Argus It is likely that Jordaens took the initiative to have these etchings made after his works.

Jordaens had a particularly close collaboration with the printmaker Marinus Robyn van der Goes who as a result created many prints after his works such as the Heracles and Cacus. Jordaens regularly prepared the prints after his own designs by creating drawings on paper, which are referred to as ‘modelletti’. They were executed in pen, ink and wash, heightened with body colour, often over a preparatory sketch in black chalk. In a few cases, the drawings were laid down on canvas to be sold as cabinet paintings.

== Sources ==
- K. Belkin and F. Healy, A House of Art. Rubens as a Collector, Antwerp, Rubenshuis, 2004
- Bielefeld, Erwin: Jordaens' Night Vision, in: Journal of the Warburg and Courtauld Institutes, Vol. 23, No. 1/2. (Jan.-Jun. 1960), pp. 177–178.
- Held, Julius S.: Jordaens' Allegory of April, in: Master Drawings, Vol. 19, No. 4. (Winter 1981), pp. 443–444, 486–487.
- d'Hulst, Roger-Adolf, Nora de Poorter, and M. Vandenven: Jacob Jordaens. 1593–1678, Antwerp, Koninklijk Museum Voor Schone Kunsten, 27 March – 27 June 1993, Catalogue. Gemeentekrediet, 1993.
- Münch, Birgit Ulrike / Pataki, Zita Ágota (Eds.): Jordaens. Genius of Grand Scale – Genie großen Formats, in collaboration with Elsa Oßwald u. Sarah-Sophie Riedel, Stuttgart 2012.
- Nelson, Kristi. Jacob Jordaens Design for Tapestry, Brepols 1998.
- Rooses, Max: Jacob Jordaens, London: J.M. Dent & Co., 1908.
