= Herregouts (disambiguation) =

Herregouts a Flemish artist family comprising 5 members who were artists: David Herregouts and his four sons as follows:

- David Herregouts, the founder of the Herregouts arts dynasty, a history painter
  - Hendrik Herregouts (1633–1704), Flemish history and portrait painter and draughtsman
  - Jan Baptist Herregouts (c. 1640–1721), Flemish painter, etcher, printmaker and brewer
  - Maximilian Herregouts, Flemish painter
  - Willem Herregouts (1640-1711), history painter
