= Linssen =

Linssen is a Dutch patronymic surname specific to Dutch Limburg. It and Linsen appear to be a hypercorrection of the name Lenssen/Lensen, where "Lens" is a local short form of the given name Laurence. Notable people with the surname include:

- Bryan Linssen (born 1990), Dutch football forward
- Edwin Linssen (born 1980), Dutch football midfielder
- Fernand Linssen (1928–2011), Belgian sprinter
- Henri Linssen (1805–1869), Dutch painter
- Jan Linsen (1602/03–1635), Dutch painter of mythological and historical themes
- Jan Linssen (1913–1995), Dutch football forward
- Jean Linssen (1904–1961), Belgian long-distance runner
- Johannes Linßen (1949–2025), German football player and coach
- Marie-Louise Linssen-Vaessen (1928–1993), Dutch freestyle swimmer
- Robert Linssen (1911–2004), Belgian Zen Buddhist and author
- Saskia Linssen (born 1970), Dutch model and actress

Lenssen

- Fabian Lenssen (born 1960s), Dutch music producer, songwriter and remixer
- Ted Lenssen (born 1952), Dutch-Canadian ice hockey goaltender

== See also ==
- Mathilda Linsén (1831–1872), Finnish pedagogue
- Linsen mit Spätzle ("lentils with pasta"), a Swabian dish
