= Luyten (disambiguation) =

Willem Jacob Luyten (1899–1994) was a Dutch-American astronomer.

Luyten may also refer to:

- Luyten (surname), with a list of other people with the surname Luyten
- 1964 Luyten, an asteroid named after Willem Jacob Luyten
- Luyten's Star, a red dwarf in the constellation Canis Minor
  - Luyten b (more commonly known as GJ 273b), a confirmed exoplanet orbiting Luyten's Star
- Luyten 726-8 (also known as Gliese 65), a binary star system that is one of Earth's nearest neighbors
- Luyten 789-6 (also known as EZ Aquarii), a triple star system in the constellation Aquarius
- Luyten 1159-16 (also known as L 1159-16), a red dwarf in the northern constellation of Aries
- Luyten Five-Tenths catalogue, a star catalogue created by Willem Jacob Luyten

== See also ==
- Lutyens (disambiguation)
- Lutjens (disambiguation)
- Luyt, surname
