= Luyten (surname) =

Luyten or (Luijten, Luiten) is a Dutch patronymic or matronymic surname. Luit, Luite, Luitje are male and female given names, usually short forms of Luitgard and particularly popular in the Middle Ages due to the female Saint Lutgardis of Tongeren (1182–1246). People with this name include

- Cor Luiten (1929–1978), Dutch football forward
- Henri Luyten (1873–1954), Belgian racing cyclist
- Henry Luyten or Jan Hendrik Luyten (1859–1945), Dutch-born Belgian painter
- Jo Luijten (born 1978), Dutch video comedian and video game developer
- Joost Luiten (born 1986), Dutch golfer
- Louis Luyten (born 1955), Belgian racing cyclist
- Magali Luyten (born 1978), Belgian rock singer
- Marcia Luyten (born 1971), Dutch journalist
- Rik Luyten (1931–1969), Belgian racing cyclist
- Willem Jacob Luyten (1899–1994), Dutch-American astronomer

== See also ==
- Luyten (disambiguation), with a list of astronomic objects named after Willem Jacob Luyten
- Jan Luiten van Zanden (born 1955), Dutch economic historian
- Luyt, surname of similar origin
