= Lutyens (disambiguation) =

Sir Edwin Lutyens (1869–1944) was a British architect.

Lutyens may also refer to:

== People ==
- Charles Augustus Henry Lutyens (1829–1915), British soldier and painter, father of Sir Edwin Lutyens
- Charles Lutyens (1933–2021), British artist, great nephew of Sir Edwin Lutyens
- Elisabeth Lutyens (1906–1983), British composer, daughter of Sir Edwin Lutyens
- Mary Wemyss (1868–1951), born Mary Lutyens, English novelist, sister of Sir Edwin Lutyens
- Mary Lutyens (1908–1999), British writer and biographer of Jiddu Krishnamurti, daughter of Sir Edwin Lutyens
- Sally Lutyens (1927–2005), American composer and author

== Other ==
- Campbell Lutyens, a private equity advisory firm

== See also ==
- Lutjens (disambiguation)
- Luyten (disambiguation)
- August Lütgens (1897–1933), German communist activist
