= National East Indies monument =

1988 memorial in Roermond, Netherlands

National East Indies monument 1945–1962
- Nationaal Indië-monument 1945–1962
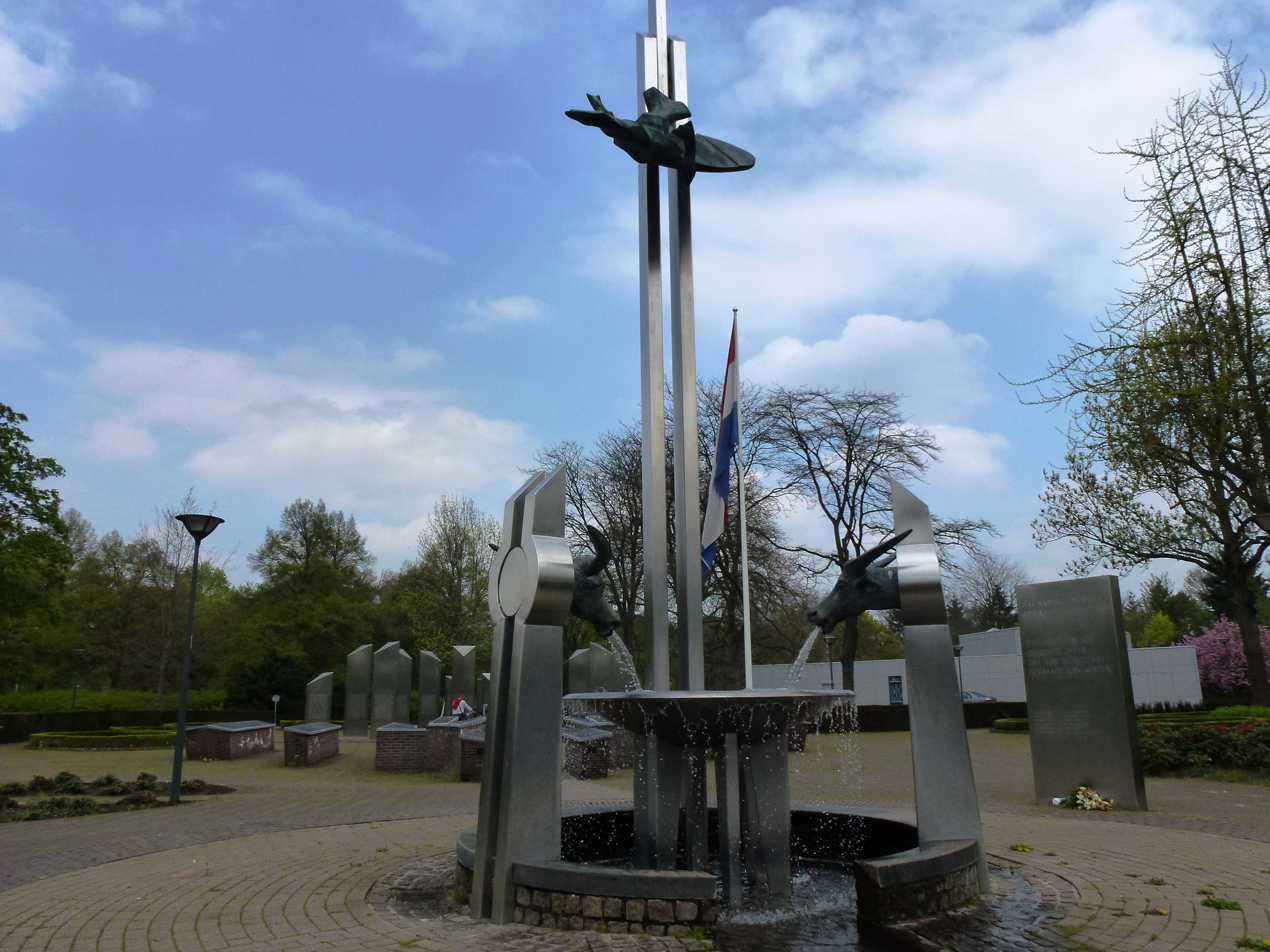
- 51°10′56″N 5°59′16″E
- Location: Roermond, Netherlands
- Designer: Dick van Wijk, Wijnand Thönissen
- Type: Memorial
- Opening date: 7 September 1988
- Website: www.nim-roermond.nl

The National East Indies monument 1945–1962 in Roermond, the Netherlands commemorates more than 6200 Dutch servicemen who died in either the former Dutch East Indies or New Guinea. The monument is located in the National Remembrance Park Roermond (Dutch: Nationaal Herdenkingspark Roermond), which also has monuments dedicated to the civilians who died during that period, as well as Dutch servicemen who died in other missions since the start of the Korean War.

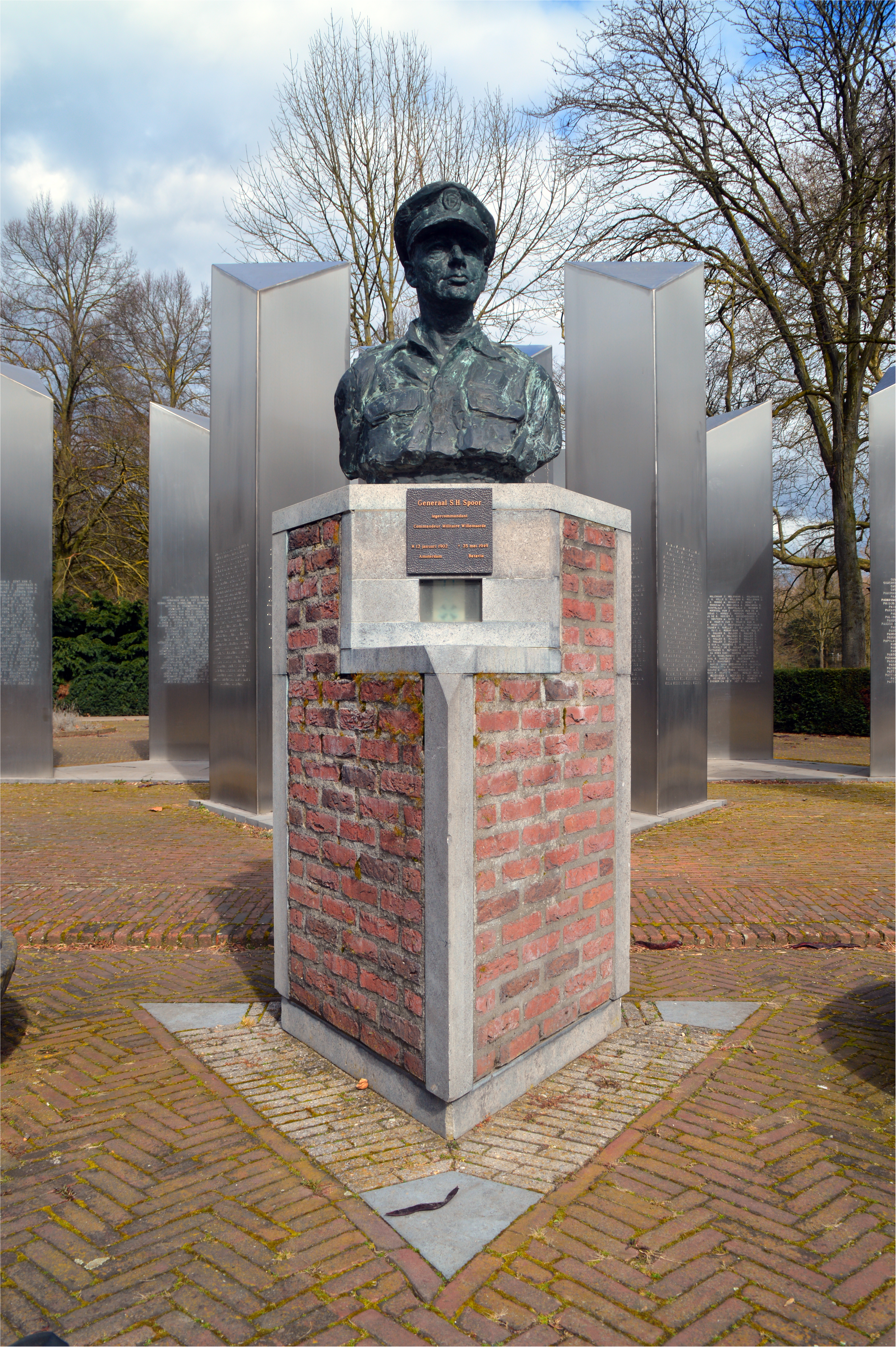
Bust of General Simon Hendrik Spoor with the names of killed servicemen inscribed on pillars.
