= Maximilian Herregouts =

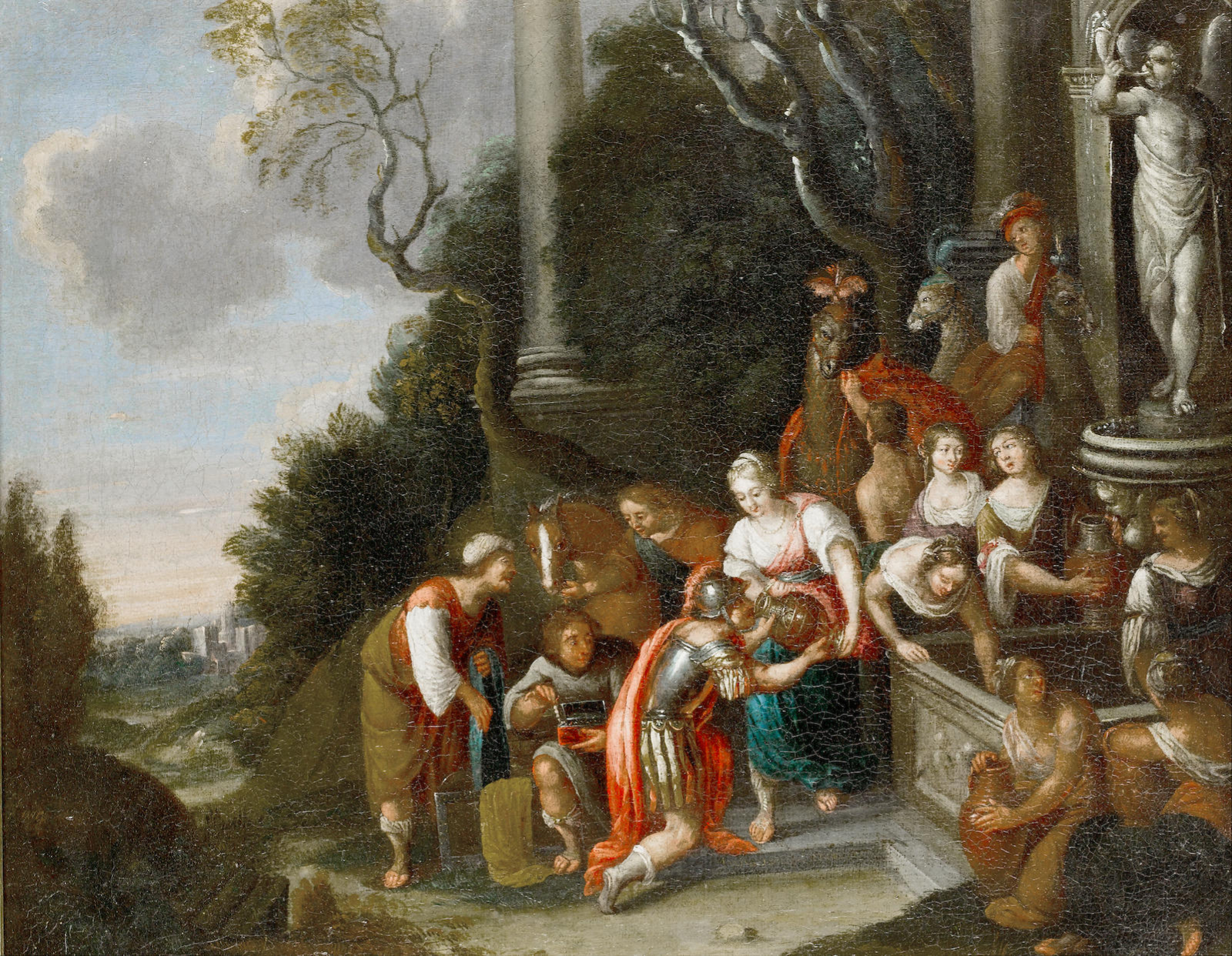
Eliezer and Rebecca at the well, c.1674

Maximilian Herregouts (fl. 1674) was a painter from the artist family Herregouts.

Maximilian Herregouts was born in Roermond, Limburg, present-day Netherlands (then Spanish Netherlands). He was the son of David Herregouts and Cecilia Genits. He was thus a brother of fellow painters Hendrik I, Guillaume and Jan Baptist Herregouts. His sister Elisabeth married Mechelen painter Gillis Smeyers.

Two works by Herregouts are known, one entitled Kitchen, in which a woman is busy baking pancakes (1674), dated and signed with his name, and a second entitled Eliezer and Rebecca at the well.
