= Lutjens (disambiguation) =

Günther Lütjens (1889–1941) was a German admiral best known for commanding the sortie of the battleship Bismarck in World War II.

Lutjens or Lütjens may also refer to:

- German destroyer Lütjens
- Lütjens-class destroyer, a class of destroyers of the German Navy
- Guus Lutjens (1884–1974), Dutch footballer

== See also ==
- Lutyens (disambiguation)
- Luyten (disambiguation)
- August Lütgens (1897–1933), German communist activist
