= Hendrik Herregouts =

Flemish Baroque artist (1633–1704)

Hendrik Herregouts (1633 in Mechelen – 1704 in Antwerp) was a Flemish history and portrait painter and draughtsman with an international career spanning Italy, Germany and his native Flanders.

== Life ==
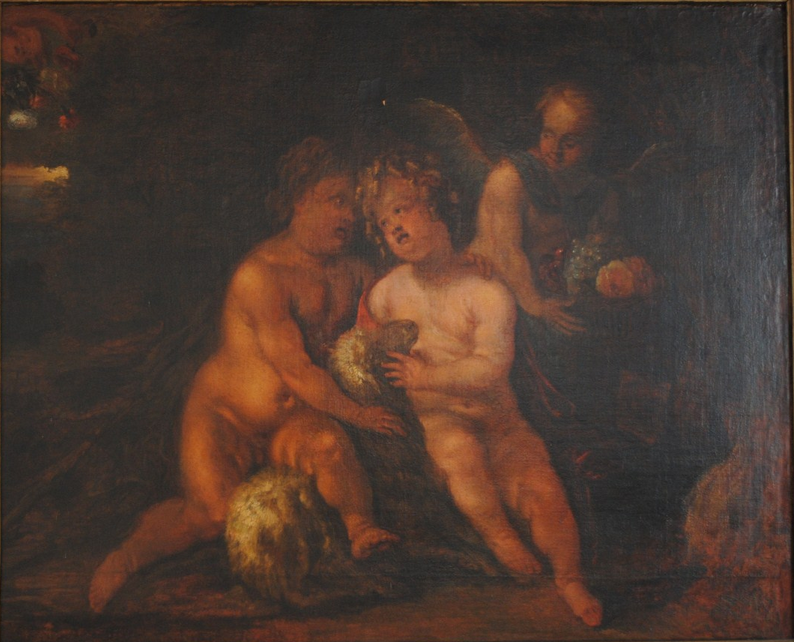
Christ and St John the Baptist as children with an angel

Hendrik Herregouts was born in Mechelen as the son of painter David Herregouts from Mechelen who moved to Roermond in 1646. Here David Herregouts built a successful career as a painter thanks to the support of the local Catholic Church. Hendrik's mother was Cecile Geniets, a daughter from a family of butchers in Mechelen. Hendrik had three brothers who became painters:

- Jan Baptist Herregouts (Roermond, c. 1646 – Bruges, 1721) was a Flemish portrait and history painter, etcher and brewer mainly active in Bruges.
- Willem Herregouts who emigrated to Amiens in France where he was known inter alia as Guillaume Herregosse or Guillaume Hergosse.
- Maximilian Herregouts about whom currently nothing much is known other than two works, one entitled Kitchen, in which a woman is busy baking pancakes (1674) and a second entitled Eliezer and Rebecca at the well.

Hendrik Herregouts likely first trained under his father who had moved to Roermond. Hendrik Herregouts travelled to Rome at an early age to continue his studies. He later moved to Germany. He married Anna Dorothea Cremers in Cologne in 1660 or 1661. In 1664 Hendrik Herregouts became a master of the Guild of Saint Luke in Antwerp, but some years later we find him completing commissions in Mechelen. Here he had to join the local Guild of Saint Luke. Around 1679–1680, he had again a workshop in Antwerp. His younger brother Jan Baptist likely joined him in his workshop in Antwerp. He became a member of the Antwerp Guild of Saint Luke in 1677. Between the years 1680 and 1690 he lived for several years in Bruges, where he was possibly joined by his brother Jan Baptist to assist with some of the religious and secular commissions he was completing in that city. He probably intermittently travelled to Italy. He was given the nickname 'Romein' (the 'Roman') because of his close connection to Italy.

His marriage was reportedly not happy and he separated from his wife. After the death of his first wife, he married a second time in Antwerp in 1682. His second wife was Nathalie Godijn, likely the sister of his pupil Abraham Godijn. In 1685 he received a commission from the Confrerie of the Holy Sacrement to design a triumphal arch to commemorate the centenary of the restoration of the Catholic cult in the St. James' Church, Antwerp.

His pupils included Abraham Godijn, Martinus van Nies (1679–1680); Alouysius Sammels and Cornelis Henricus van Meurs (1693–1694).

He died at an elevated age in Antwerp.

== Work ==
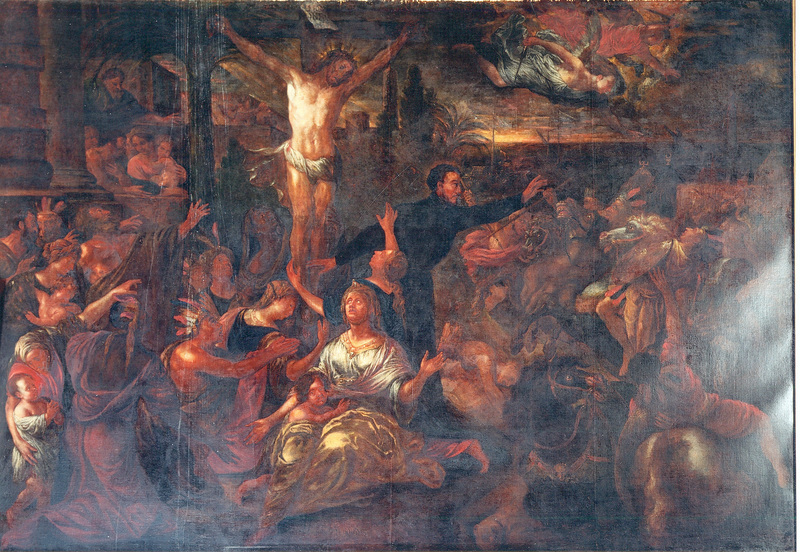
The Triumph of the Cross

Hendrik Herregouts was highly regarded in his time and he received many commissions for altarpieces and religious works in Flanders and abroad. He was also known as a portrait painter. The majority of his works can be found in churches in Antwerp, Bruges, Mechelen and Cologne. A number of his works in Cologne were lost during World War II. He was influenced by the palette of various artists such as Anthony van Dyck and Peter Paul Rubens as well as by Italian painters such as Titian, Rafael and Caravaggio. Poussin was important as an influence on his classicizing style and overall composition. His works are often on a grand scale and complex. His masterpiece is the Last Judgement in the Church of Saint Anne in Bruges, a very large-scale composition completed in 1685. The colossal figures in the work are reminiscent of the Mannerist painter Raphael Coxie. A Martyrdom of Saint Matthew, originally painted for the Antwerp Cathedral is now in the St. Paul's Church, Antwerp. A Divine Friend of Children dated 1680 in the Göttweig Abbey near Krems in Lower Austria shows his mastery of colour and composition.

He painted many portraits. His portraits are characterized by their blunt directness and lively immediacy. An example is the Portrait of Franciscus Wynckelman, voogd 1709–25 at the Hans Memlingmuseum in Bruges. He also often collaborated with other painters. He painted the staffage in the landscapes of Jan Asselijn. In his later years, he collaborated with still life painters Gaspar Peeter Verbruggen the Younger, Simon Hardimé and Jan Baptist Bosschaert who painted flowers around putti and nymphs painted by Herregouts.

He provided designs for publications by Antwerp and international printers. An example is the Scholars Discover the Tetragram, the frontispiece of Henricus Engelgrave's book Coelum Empyreum published by Joannes Busaeus in Cologne in 1666.

Herregouts has sometimes been confused with an obscure genre painter by the name H. or Hendrick Herdebout; There is not always unanimity over the attribution of certain works to Hendrik or his brother Jan Baptist as their styles were similar.
