= Jo Luijten =

Dutch video artist

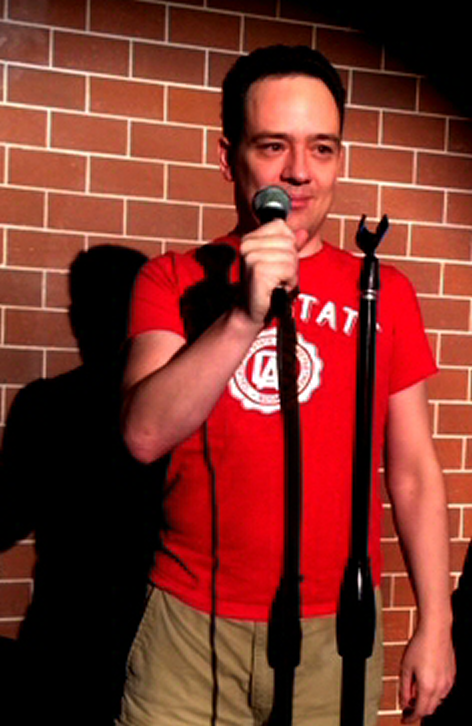
- Luijten performing at the Ha Ha Cafe Comedy Club in North Hollywood
- Born: Jo Jacobus Wilhelmus Luijten; 24 April 1978 (age 48); Roermond, Netherlands
- Education: Utrecht University
- Occupation: Video artist
- Years active: 2012-present
- Website: www.joluijten.com

Jo Jacobus Wilhelmus Luijten (Roermond, 24 April 1978) is a Dutch comedy video artist & video game developer who works with Kinna McInroe as narrator under the pseudonym of Squirrel-Monkey.

== Videos ==
Most of the Squirrel-Monkey videos show what social networking sites and video games might have looked like if created on the computers of the 1980s or 1990s. Since their introduction in March 2012, the videos have received positive press from a number of news and technology websites, including Mashable, Wired, The Huffington Post, CNET and Gizmodo.

The Nighthawk Cinema in New York City in collaboration with Daily Motion selected his Squirrel-Monkey video If Angry Birds were invented in the ’80s for the Cinema Selects cinema screening. The Hungarian online magazine Urbnplyr considered the video If Instagram were invented in the '80s... as one of the best videos of 2014.

Luijten also works outside of the Squirrel-Monkey productions. In 2013, as part of the YouTube Comedy Week, Warwick Davis presented Warwick Davis' Top 10 Tech Sketch Moments, which included a video made by Luijten.

== Games ==
In 2016 Luijten developed two election-inspired online games, with Hillary Clinton and Donald Trump as their main characters. The object of the game is to win the United States presidential election.
