= Luyt =

Luyt is the name of:

- Dennis Luyt (born c. 1963), Former Commander of the Royal Netherlands Air Force
- Frederick Luyt (1888–1965), South African rugby union player and cricketer
- Jan Luyts (1655–1721), Dutch mathematician and physicist
- Louis Luyt (1932–2013), South African business tycoon and politician
- Richard Luyt (1915–1994), South African-born Governor of British Guiana
- Syd Luyt (1925–2010), South African marathon runner

== See also ==
- Luyten (surname), surname of similar origin
