= Herregouts =

Flemish artist family

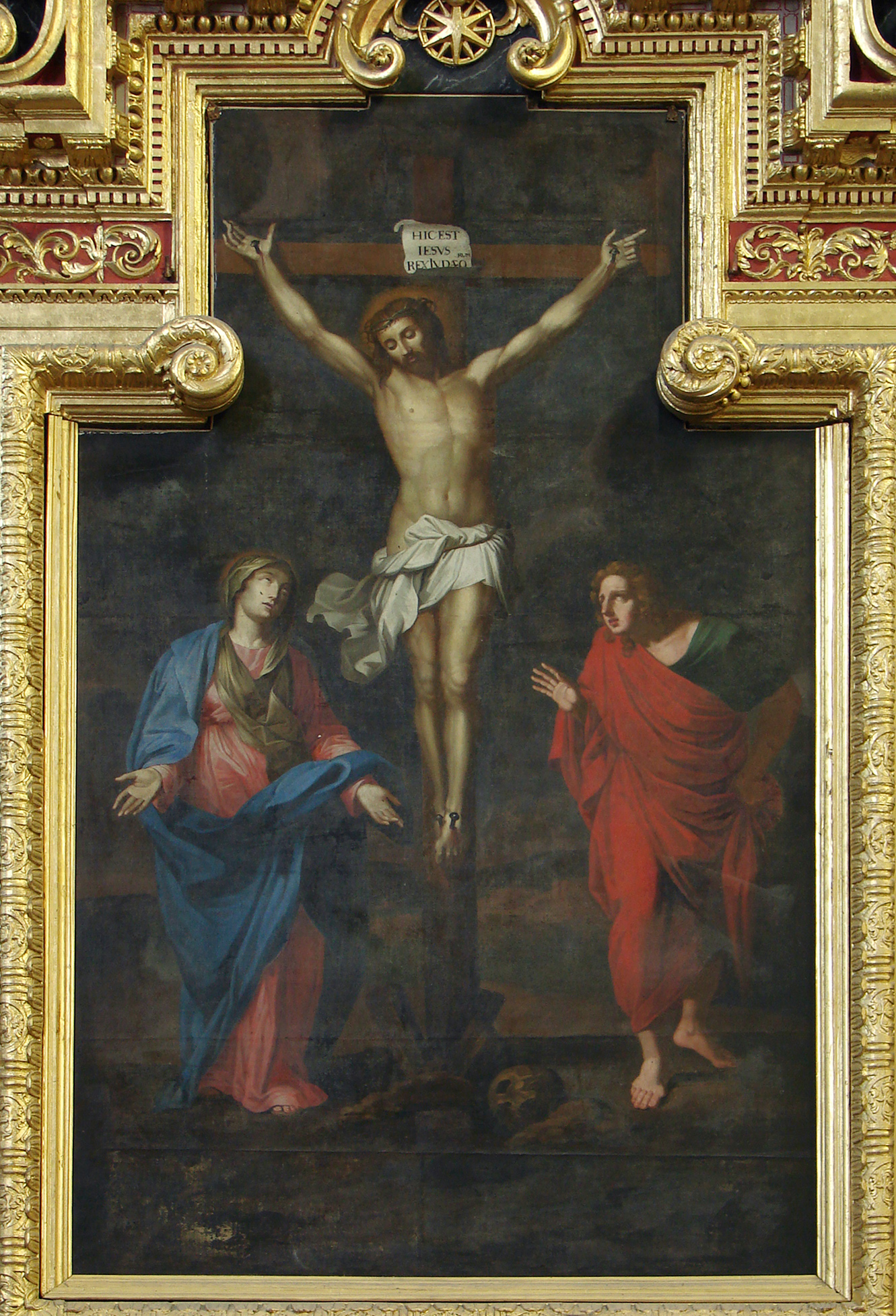
Christ on the Cross, attributed to Willem Herregouts

The Flemish artist family Herregouts is believed to comprise five members who were artists: David Herregouts and his four sons.

== David Herregouts ==
David Herregouts, the founder of the dynasty, was a history painter born in Mechelen in 1603 as the son of Sebastian Herregouts and Elisabeth De Gorter, daughter from a brewing family. He married Cecile Geniets from a butcher's family. He was a pupil of his cousin Salmier and a member of the Guild of St. Luke in his own city in 1624. In 1646 he moved to Roermond, where in 1647 he was received a member of the Guild of St. Luke. He had a successful career in Roermond as he enjoyed the patronage of prominent clients, including the bishop. He died in Roermond in 1663.

David Herregouts had four sons named Hendrik, Willem, Jan Baptist and Maximilian who became painters.

His chief work, "St. Joseph Awakened by an Angel", was painted for the church of St. Catherine in Mechelen.

== Hendrik Herregouts ==
Hendrik Herregouts (Mechelen, 1633 – Antwerp, 1704) was a history and portrait painter and draughtsman with an international career spanning Italy, Germany and his native Flanders.

== Willem Herregouts ==
Willem Herregouts (probably Mechelen 1640 - Amiens 1711) was a history painter who emigrated to Amiens in France where he was known inter alia as Guillaume Herregosse or Guillaume Hergosse and had a successful career.

== Jan Baptist Herregouts ==
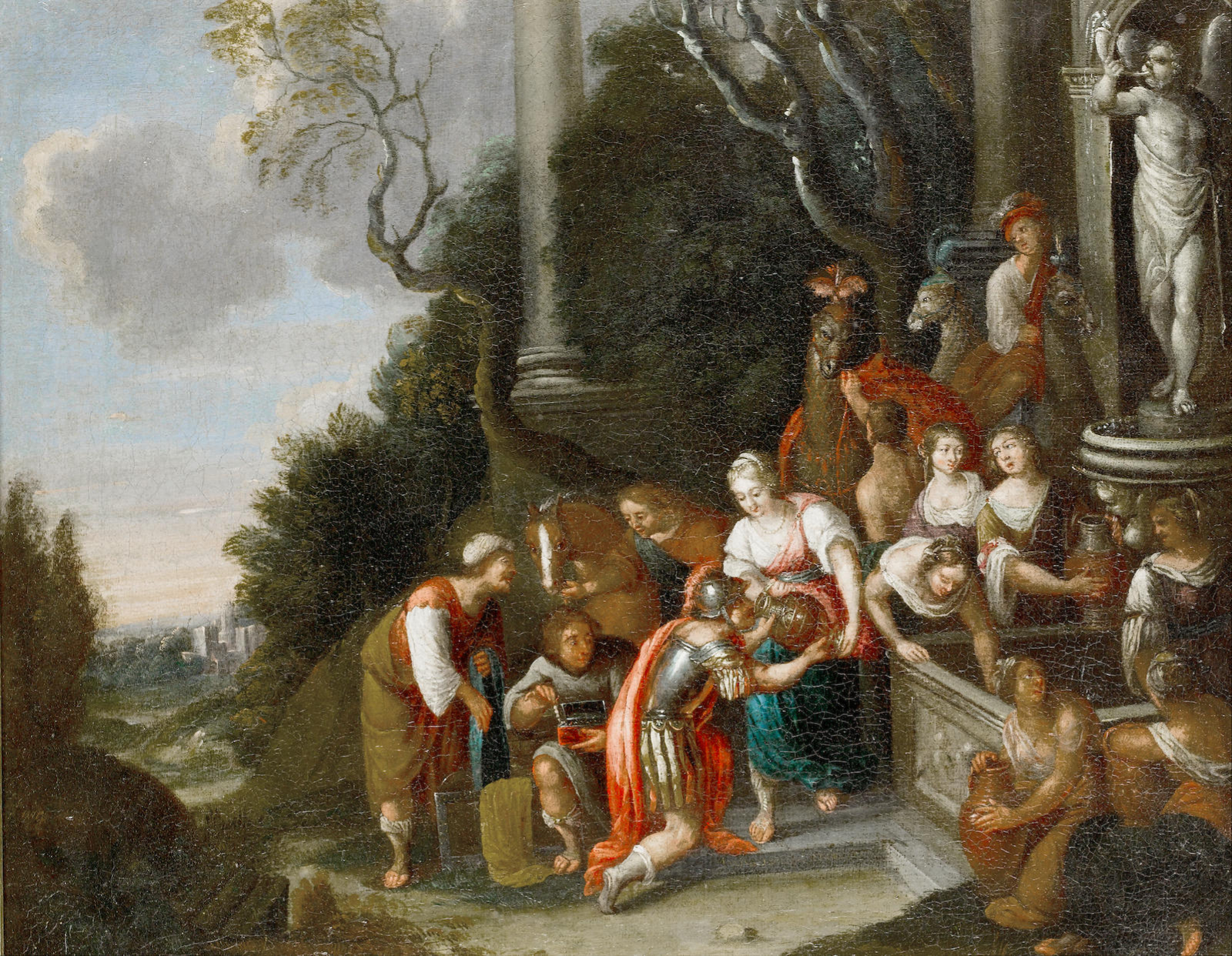
Eliezer and Rebecca at the well by Maximilian Herregouts

Jan Baptist Herregouts (Roermond, c. 1646 – Bruges, 25 November 1721) was a portrait and history painter, etcher and brewer mainly active in Bruges.

== Maximilian Herregouts ==
Little is known about Maximilian Herregouts other than two works, one entitled Kitchen, in which a woman is busy baking pancakes (1674) and a second entitled Eliezer and Rebecca at the well.
