= Henri Linssen =

Dutch painter (1805–1869)

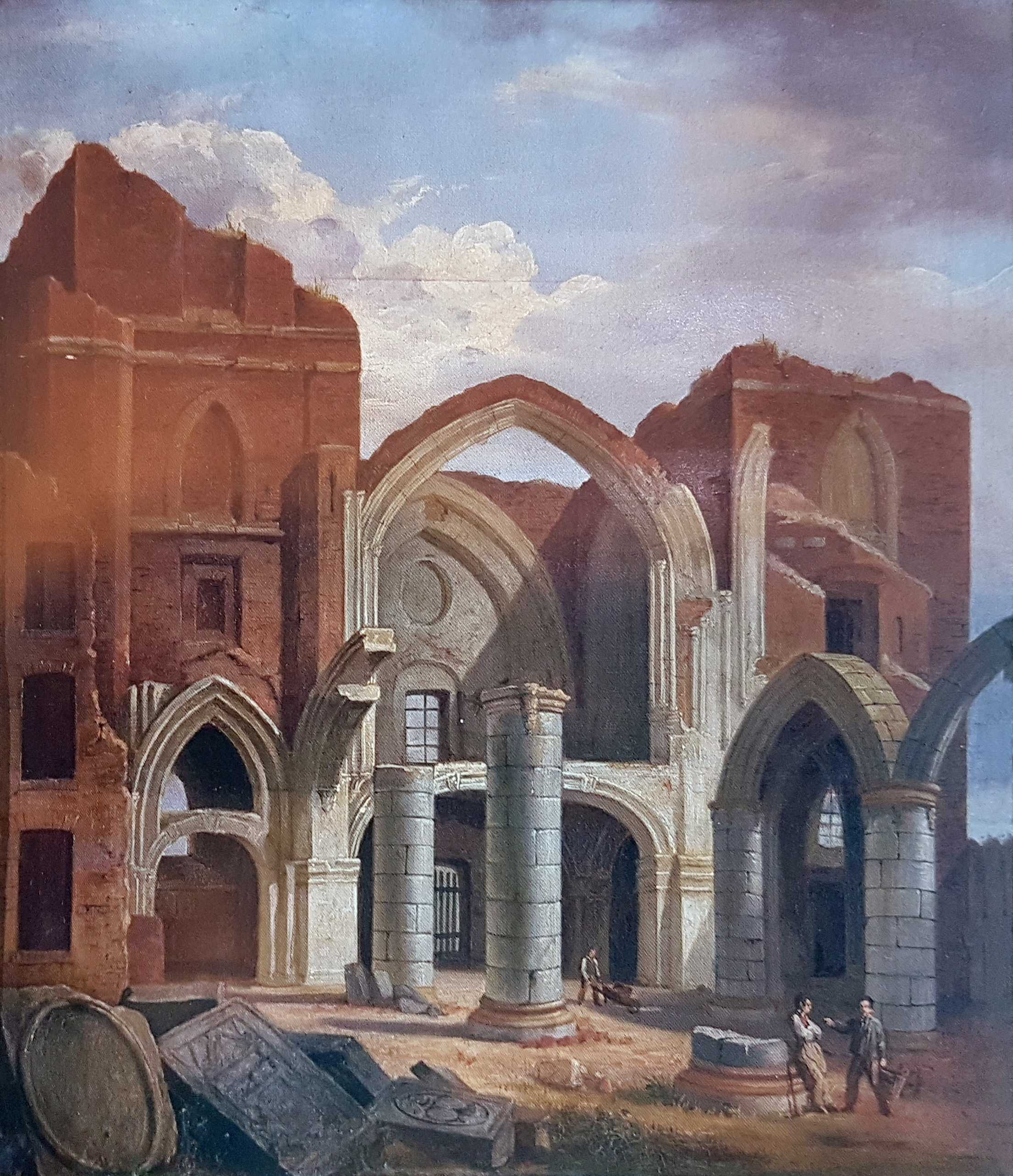
Ruined church in Roermond, after 1842

Henri Linssen (Roermond, 28 October 1805 – Roermond, 8 April 1869) was a Dutch painter.

== Biography ==
Henri Linssen was born in Roermond, Limburg, on 28 October 1805. He was active in Antwerp from 1824 to 1828. In 1830 he moved to Paris, where he studied, and was active until 1843. Between 1834 and 1840 he exhibited at the Salon. In 1843 he returned to Roermond and was named director of the Stadstekenschool (municipal drawing school). He retired in 1861. Linssen died in Roermond on 8 April 1869.

== Works (selection) ==
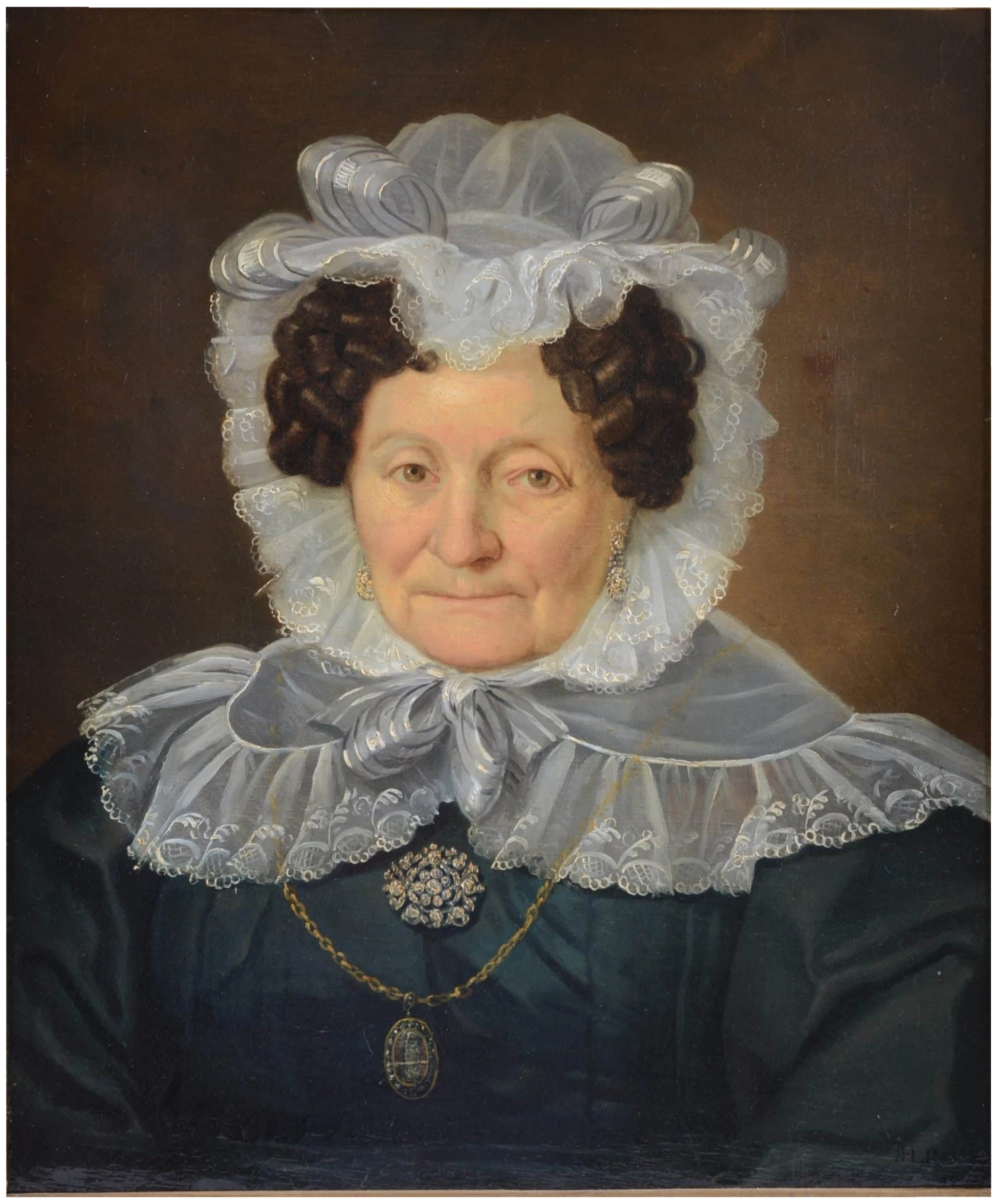
Portrait of Baroness Mathilde van Wevelinghoven, 1830

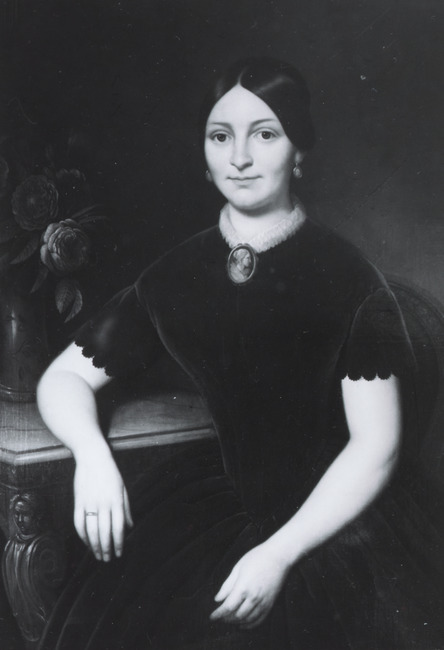
Portrait of Josephine Marie Louise Walland, 1850

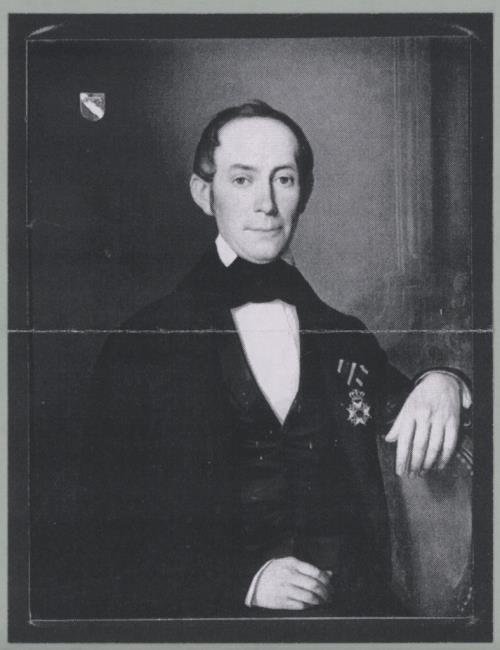
Portrait of Robert Marcel Arnold Magnee, 1852

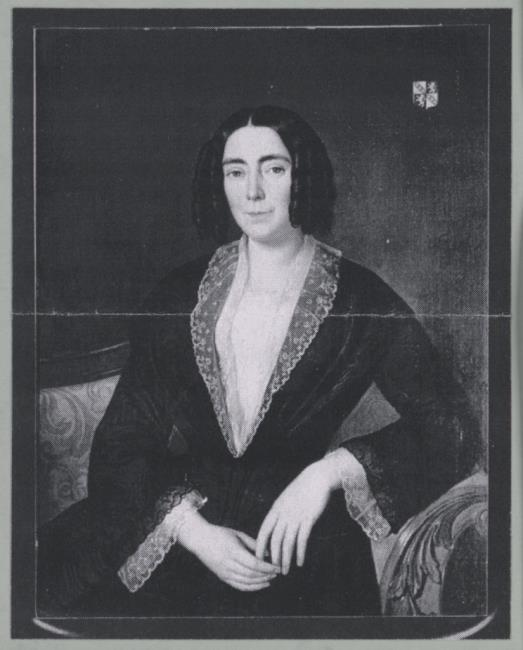
Portrait of Catherine Elise Josephine Robertine de Bellefroid, 1852

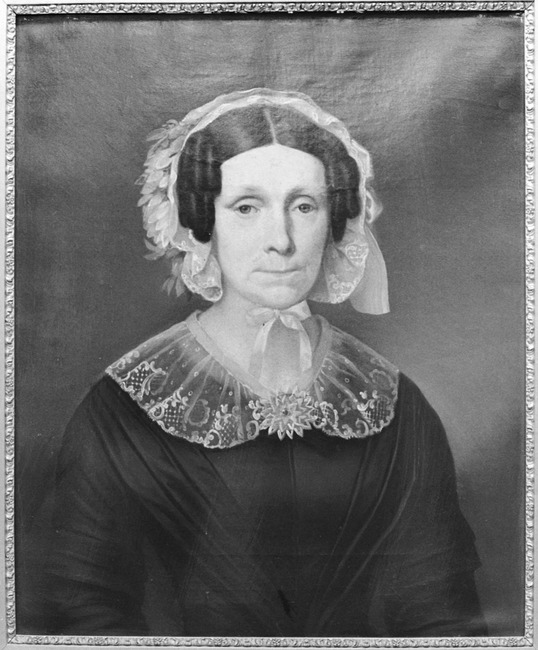
Portrait of Schiefer, 1860
