= Jan Baptist Herregouts =

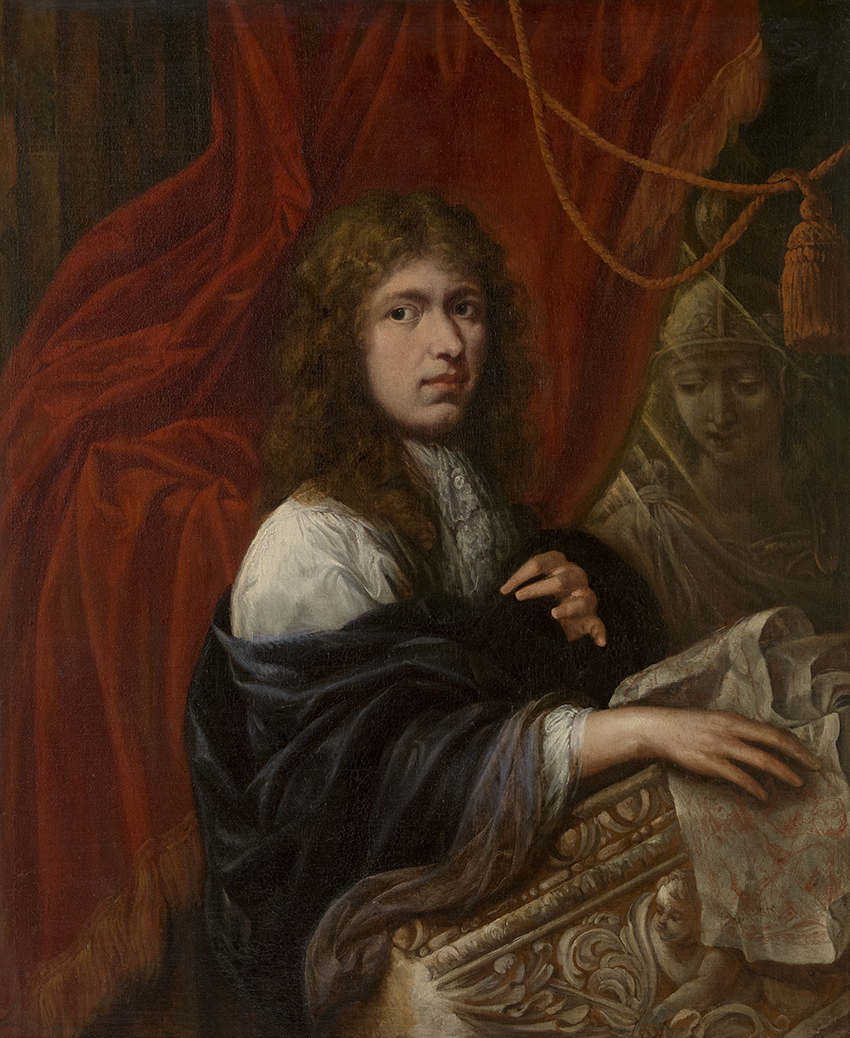
Presumed self-portrait, c. 1680

Jan Baptist Herregouts (c. 1640 – 25 November 1721) was a Flemish painter, etcher, printmaker and brewer. He is known for his portraits, history subjects and allegorical scenes.

== Life ==
Jan Baptist Herregouts was likely born in Roermond (or possibly in Dendermonde) between 1635 and 1645 as the son of David Herregouts and Cecilia Genits or Geniets. His father was a painter from Mechelen who had moved to Roermond in 1646. Here David Herregouts had built a successful career as a painter thanks to the support of the local Catholic Church. Jan Baptist's mother was a daughter from a family of butchers in Mechelen.

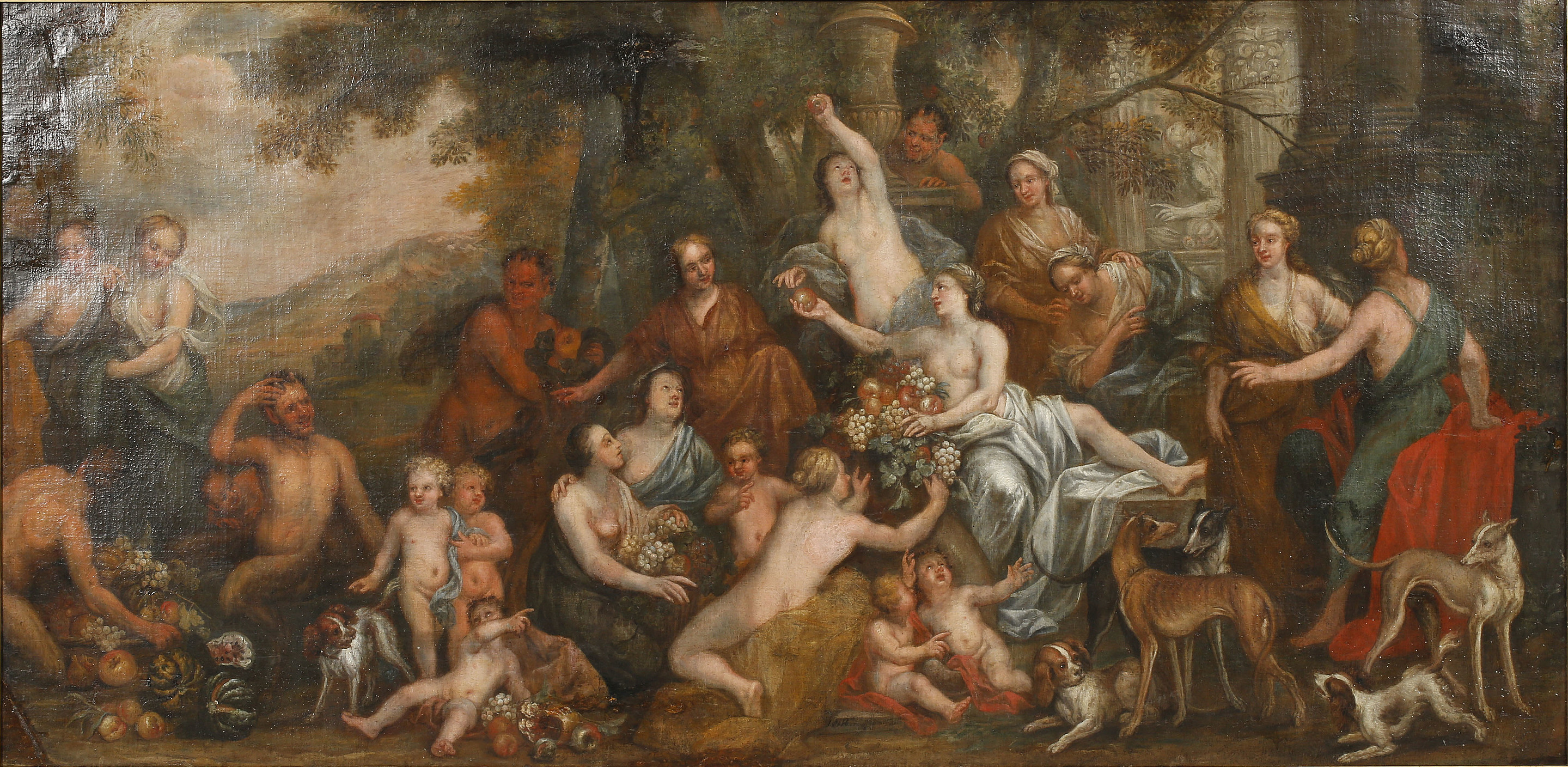
Allegory of abundance

Jan Baptist had three brothers who were painters: Hendrik Herregouts (Mechelen, 1633 – Antwerp, 1704) who had a peripatetic career as a painter including stays in Antwerp and Bruges, Willem Herregouts who emigrated to Amiens in France where he was known i.a. as Guillaume Herregosse or Guillaume Hergosse and Maximilian Herregouts about whom currently nothing much is known other than two works, one entitled Kitchen, in which a woman is busy baking pancakes (1674) and a second entitled Eliezer and Rebecca at the well.

Jan Baptist likely first trained under his father and may have made a study tour to Italy. He then worked for several years in Antwerp probably in the workshop of his brother Hendrik. He became a member of the Antwerp Guild of Saint Luke between 18 September 1667 and 17 September 1677. He remained a member until 1682 when he moved to Bruges. Here he possibly assisted his brother Hendrik with some of the commissions he was completing in that city. In 1684, he lived at the home of the sculptor Norbertus van den Eynde, son of Huibrecht van den Eynde. He became a master in the Bruges Guild of Saint Luke in 1684. He subsequently filled various leadership positions in the guild. In 1717 he was one of the four artists who contributed funds to the creation of a drawing academy in Bruges.

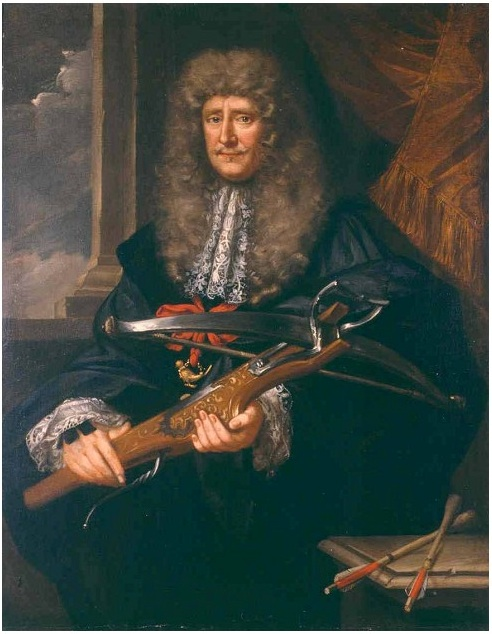
Portrait of Laurentius van de Velde, Headman of the Guild of St. George in Bruges

Jan Baptist became a successful history and portrait painter. He married Anna-Pieternelle Timmermans. The couple had two children: Marie-Anne Herregouts (1685–1749) and Jan Baptist Herregouts (1688–1717). Jan Baptist or his wife likely operated a beer brewery in Bruges.

He died in Bruges where he was buried in the St James Church.

== Work ==
Jan Baptist is mainly known for his many altar pieces and religious works that he produced for the churches of Bruges. He also produced a number of portraits although there are some doubts about the authorship of some of the portraits attributed to him. An art historian has argued that his self-portrait and the portrait of his father (both in the Groeningemuseum) that are usually attributed to him are possibly the work of his brother Hendrik.

The following works of Jan Baptist Herregouts are preserved in Bruges:

- Portrait of his father (Groeningemuseum)
- Self-portrait (Groeningemuseum)
- Portrait of Laurentius van de Velde, King of the Guild of St. George in Bruges (Groeningemuseum)
- The Ascension of Mary (Seminary Church)
- The Coronation of Our Lady (Godelieve Abbey)
- The Circumcision (St. Anne's Church)

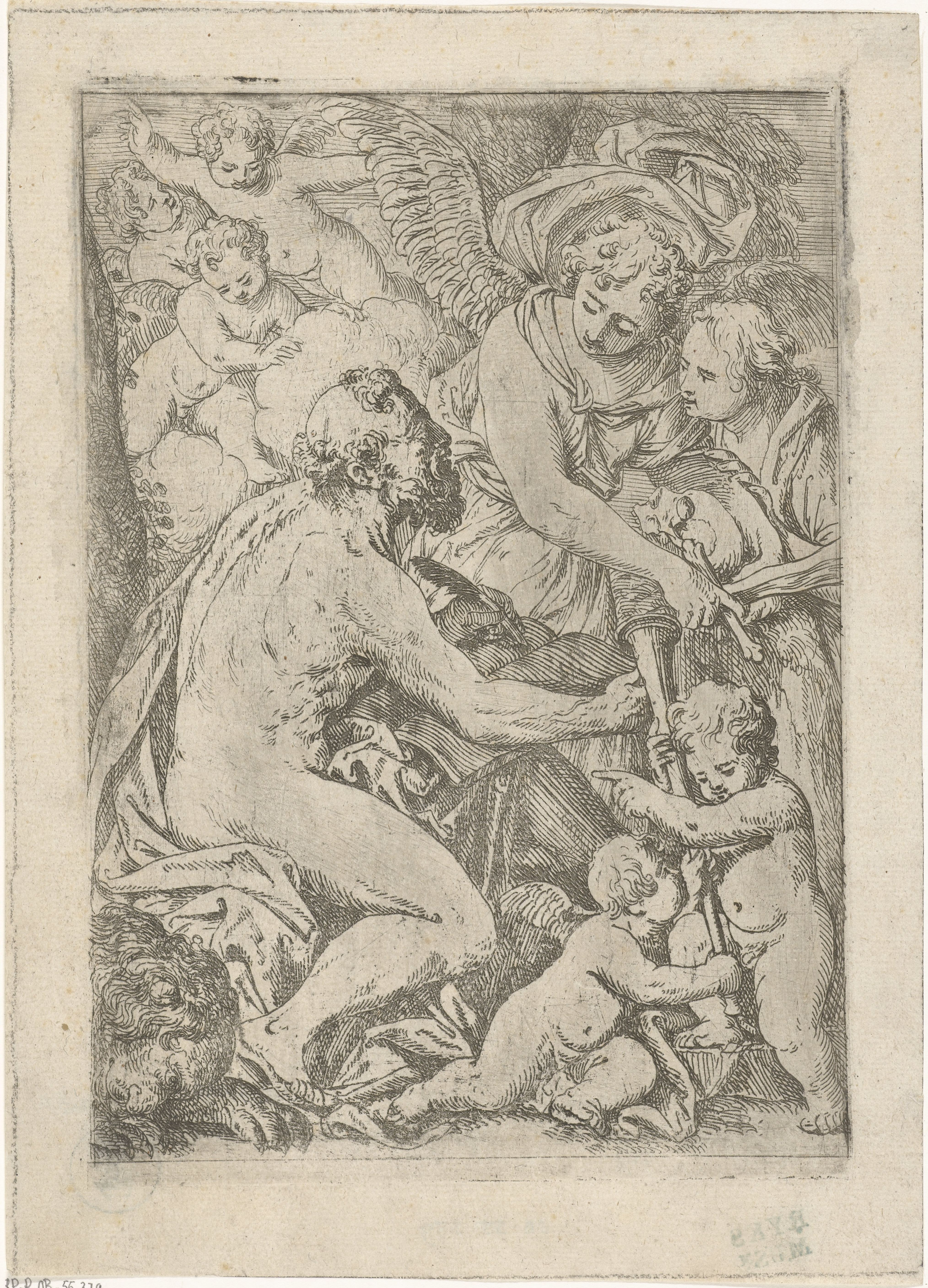
Saint Jerome

- The Raising of Lazarus (St James' Church)
- The Ecstasy of the St Dominic (Church of Our Lady)
- The Martyrdom of St Peter of Verona (Church of Our Lady)
- The Ascension of Mary (Public Centre for Social Welfare Bruges)

Jan Baptist Herregouts was regarded as a capable painter in the style of the late 17th century. His palette was much admired.

Jan Baptist Herregouts was also active as an engraver. Etchings by his hand are executed in a pleasant and loose style.
