= Mathilda Linsén =

Finnish pedagogue, founder and principal of the first Finnish school for the blind

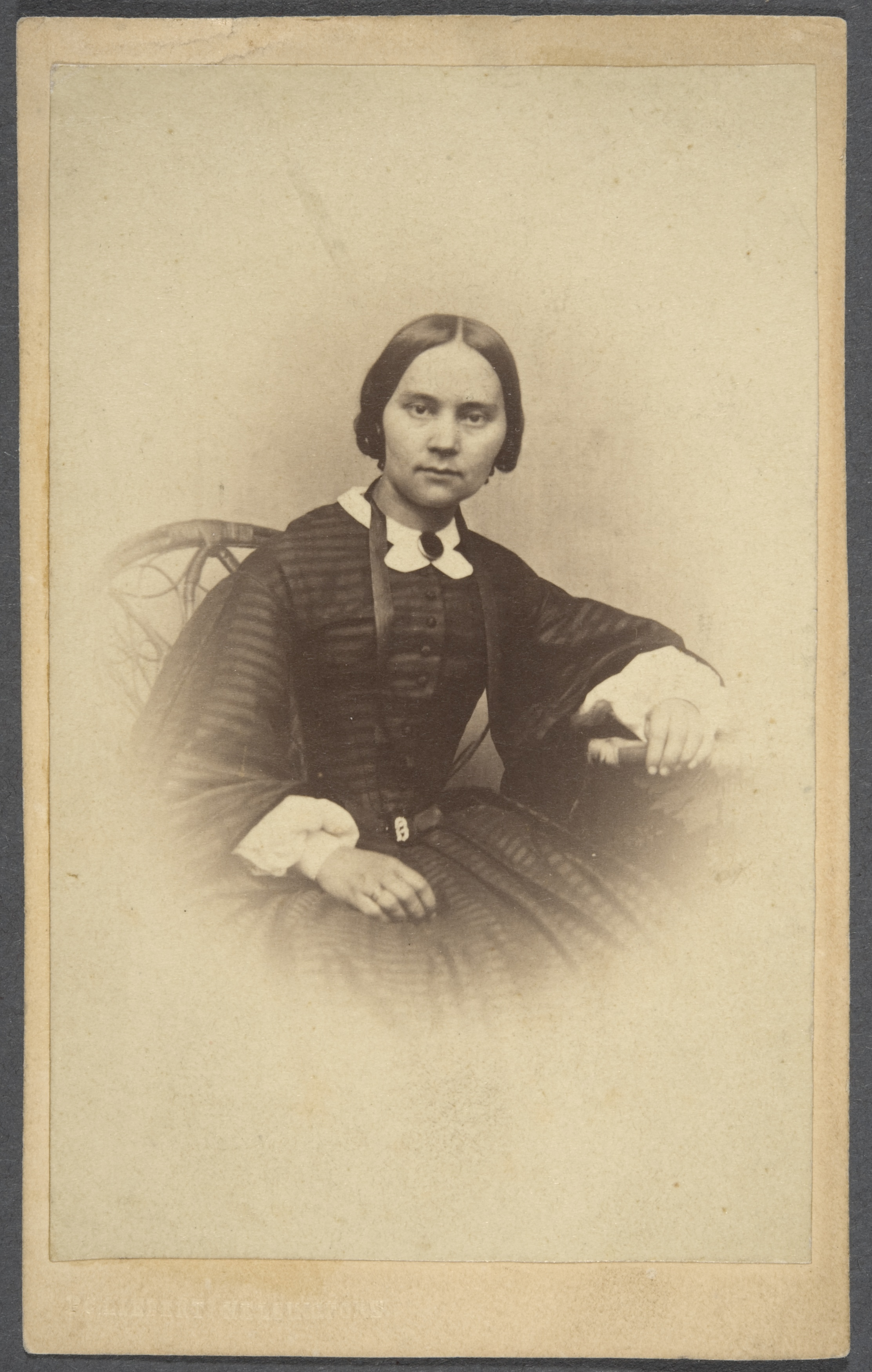
- Johanna Mathilda
- Born: Johanna Mathilda Linsén; November 26, 1831; Helsinki, Grand Duchy of Finland, Russian Empire
- Died: February 5, 1872 (aged 40); Helsinki, Grand Duchy of Finland, Russian Empire
- Occupation: Educator
- Years active: 1860s–1872
- Known for: Founder and head of the first school for the blind in Finland
- Notable work: Reports and studies on the education of the blind (1860s)

Johanna Mathilda Linsén (November 26, 1831, Helsinki - February 5, 1872), was a Finnish pedagogue. She is regarded as a pioneer within the education of the blind in Finland: she was the founder and principal of the first school for the blind in Finland in 1865-1872.

== Life ==
Mathilda Linsén was the daughter of professor Johan Gabriel Linsen and Wilhelmina Petronella Hoeckert, and sister of the composer Gabriel Linsén. She was educated by her father and as an autodidact. By the help of Uno Cygnaeus, she was given state support to study the education of the blind in Germany and Scandinavia in 1863-64. In 1865, her rapport was published, and Finland's first school for the blind was founded in Helsinki, for which she was made principal. In 1867, she published another investigation on the subject.
