= Roermond =

City and municipality in Limburg, Netherlands

Roermond Remunj / Remuunj (Limburgish)
- City and municipality
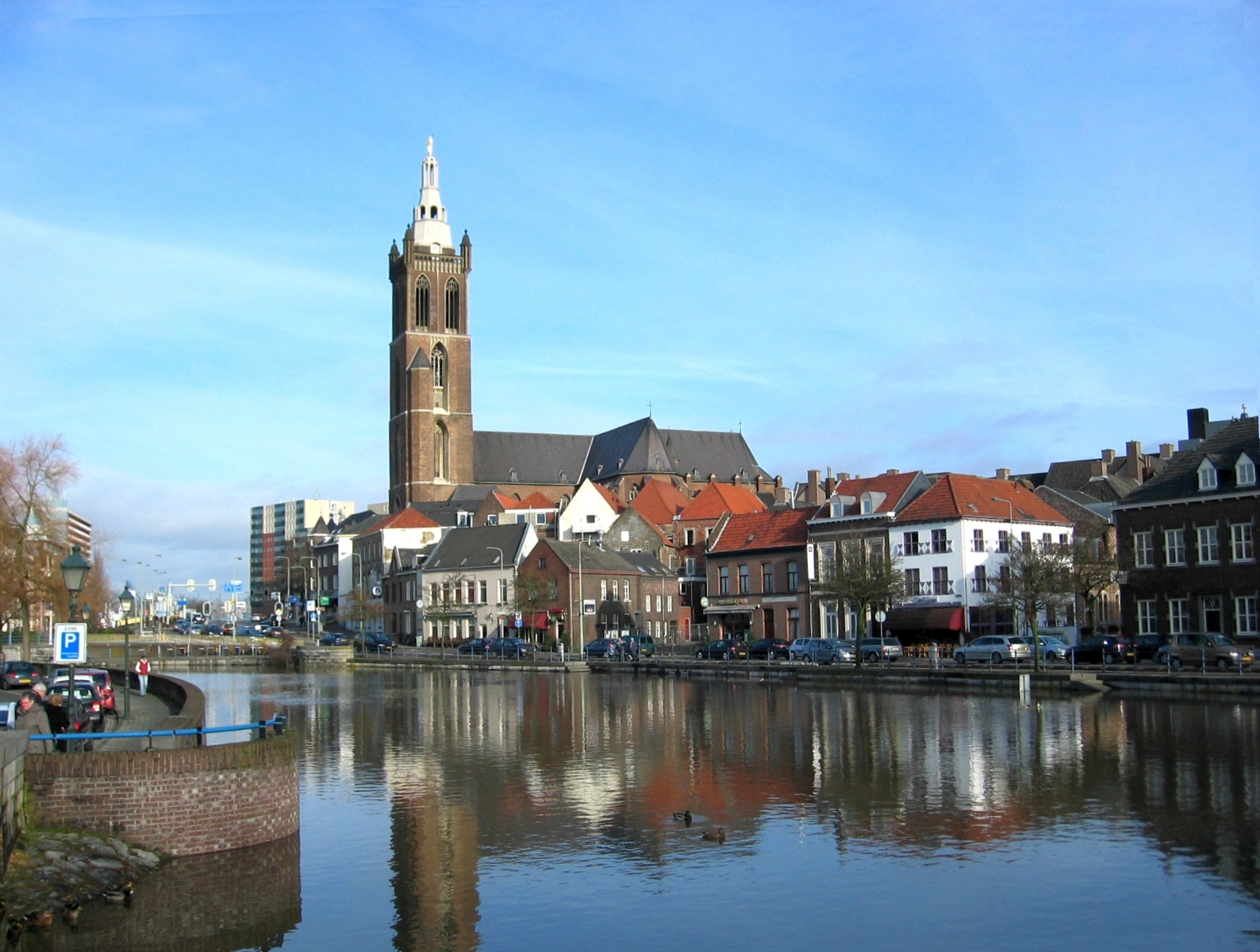
- Roermond in 2011

- Flag Coat of arms
- Motto: Aequitas Iudicia Tua, Domine (Latin) transl. Thy judgements are just, O Lord (Psalm 119)
- Location in Limburg

- Location within the Netherlands Location within Europe
- Coordinates: 51°12′N 5°59′E
- Country: Netherlands
- Province: Limburg

Government
  - Body: Municipal council
  - Mayor: Yolanda Hoogtanders (VVD)

Area
  - Total: 71.05 km^{2} (27.43 sq mi)
  - Land: 60.81 km^{2} (23.48 sq mi)
  - Water: 10.24 km^{2} (3.95 sq mi)
- Elevation: 22 m (72 ft)

Population (January 2021)
  - Total: 58,763
  - Density: 966/km^{2} (2,500/sq mi)
- Demonym: Roermondenaar
- Time zone: UTC+1 (CET)
  - Summer (DST): UTC+2 (CEST)
- Postcode: 6040–6049, 6070–6071
- Area code: 0475
- Website: www.roermond.nl

Roermond (Dutch pronunciation: [ruːrˈmɔnt]; Limburgish: Remunj [ʀəˈmʏɲ] or Remuunj [ʀəˈmyːɲ]) is a city, municipality, and diocese in the Limburg province of the Netherlands. Roermond is a historically important town on the lower Roer on the east bank of the river Meuse. It received town rights in 1231. Roermond's town centre has become a designated conservation area.

Through the centuries, the town has filled the role of commercial centre and a principal town in the duchy of Guelders. Since 1559, it has served as the seat of the Roman Catholic Diocese of Roermond. The skyline of the town is dominated by the towers of its two churches, St. Christopher's Cathedral and Roermond Minster ("Munsterkerk" in Dutch). In addition to the churches, the town centre has many significant buildings and monuments.

== History ==
Celtic inhabitants of this region used to live on both sides of the river Roer. Invading Romans built a bridge (now called the Steene Brök, or stone bridge) and founded the first town at Roermond, now a suburb called Voorstad Sint Jacob.

=== Guelders ===
Around 1180–1543, Roermond belonged to the Duchy of Guelders. In 1213 Roermond was destroyed by Otto IV of Brunswick, the Holy Roman Emperor and German King. By 1232 the town had been rebuilt and was given its own seal, reign, mint, and court.

The first mention of the monastery of the Franciscan Friars Minor, the Minderbroederklooster, was in 1309. In 1361, the Chapter of the Holy Spirit moved from Sint Odiliënberg to Roermond. In 1376 Roermond Charterhouse was founded.

Around 1350, Roermond became the capital of the "Overkwartier van Gelre" (Upper Quarter of Gelre). In 1388, during the Hundred Years' War, it was besieged by the French. A battle for the outer fortifications Buiten Op, destruction of these fortifications, and the old parish church followed.

In 1441, Roermond became a member of the Hanseatic League, and by 1472 acquired the right to mint its own coins.

=== Spanish Netherlands ===
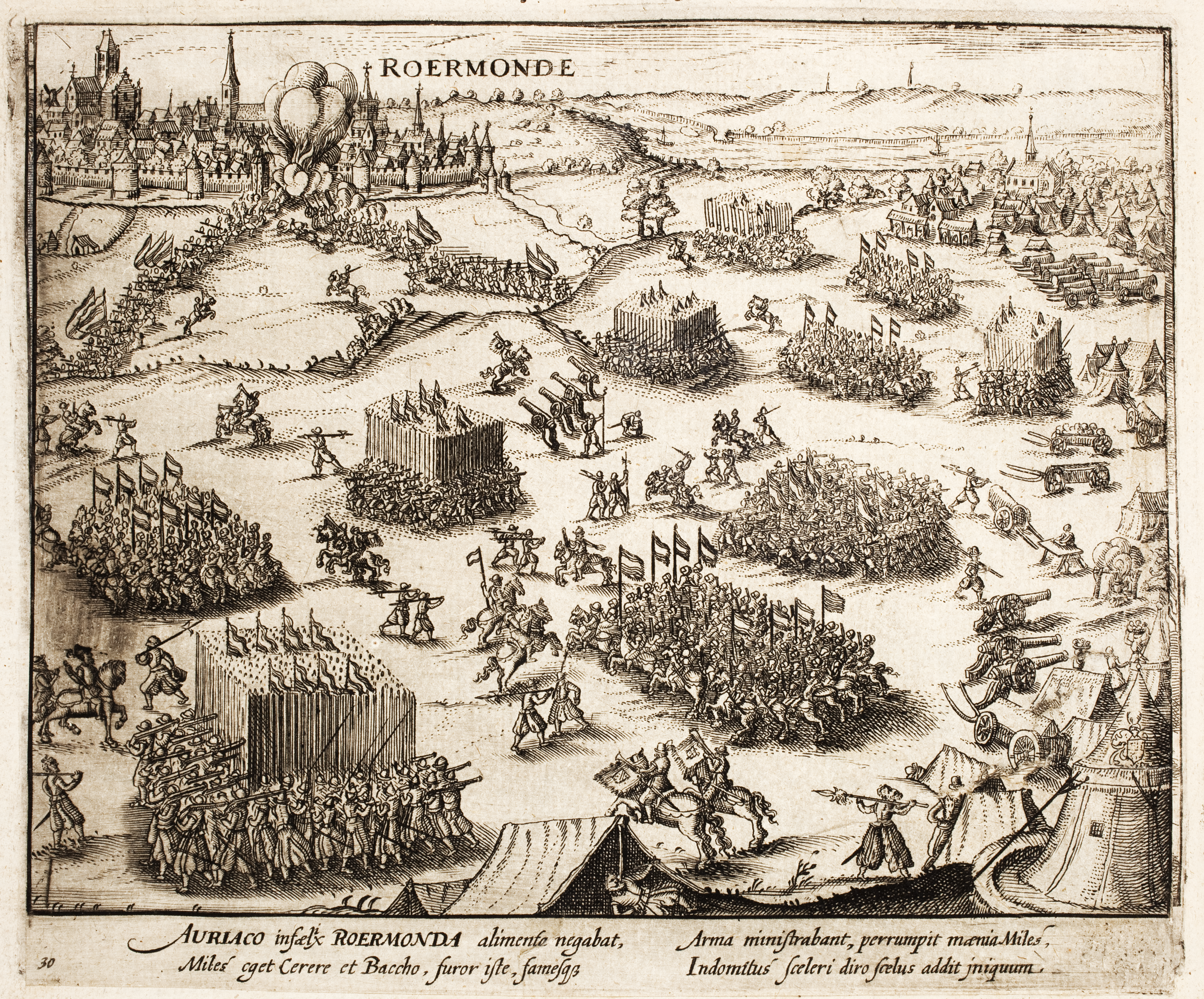
Attack on Spanish Roermond by William the Silent in 1572

Between 1543 and 1702 the area was part of the Spanish Netherlands, known in Spanish as Ruremunda.

On 23 April 1568 the Battle of Rheindalen occurred near Roermond, which signalled the start of the Eighty Years' War. In 1572, Roermond was occupied by the Dutch William the Silent. On 23 July 1572, 13 Catholic clerics were murdered in the town of Roermond by militant Dutch Calvinists (Martyrs of Roermond). Roermond was recaptured by the Spanish duke Fadrique Álvarez de Toledo.

Under Spanish rule, Roermond became a bastion of the Counter-Reformation. On behalf of the Inquisition, people were encouraged to report suspects of witchcraft and heresy. In 1613, 64 witches were burnt on Galgeberg hill near the Kapel in 't Zand in Roermond, the largest witch trial in the Netherlands ever.

In 1632 the Dutch Stadhouder Frederik Hendrik conquered Roermond along with Venlo and Maastricht during his famous "March along the Meuse". Attempts in the next few years to annex Antwerp and Brussels failed, however. The northern Dutch were disappointed by the lack of local support. The Counter-Reformation had firmly reattached the local population to Roman Catholicism, and they now distrusted the Calvinist Northerners even more than they loathed the Spanish occupiers.

Between 1632 and 1637, Roermond was under the control of the Dutch Republic, and again from 1702 to 1716. Between 1716 and 1794, it was part of the Austrian Netherlands within the Habsburg monarchy.

=== French period ===
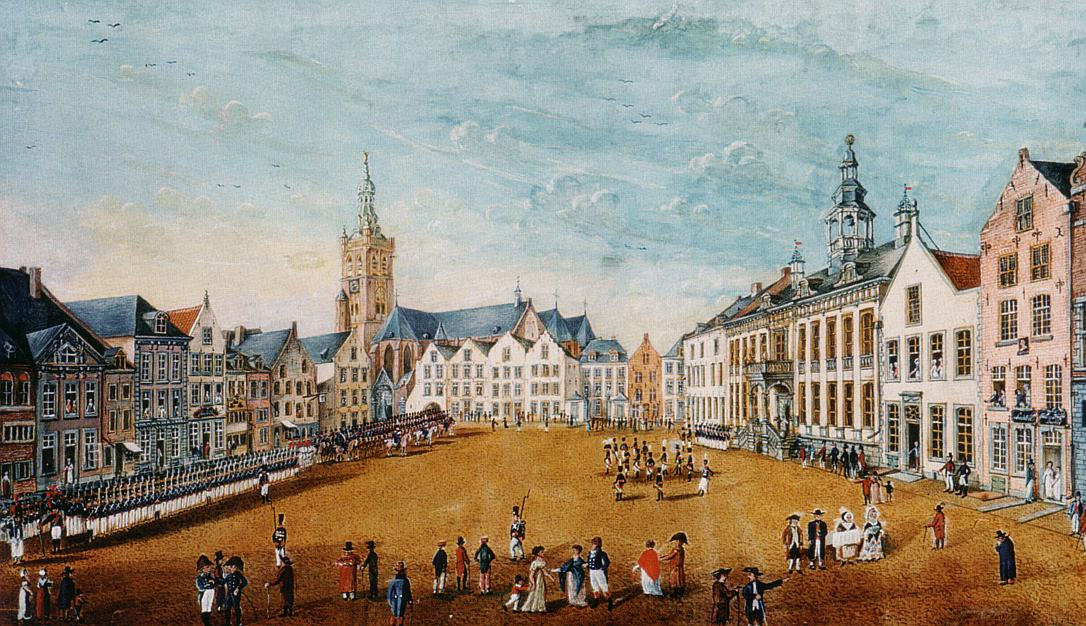
French troops in Roermond, 1793

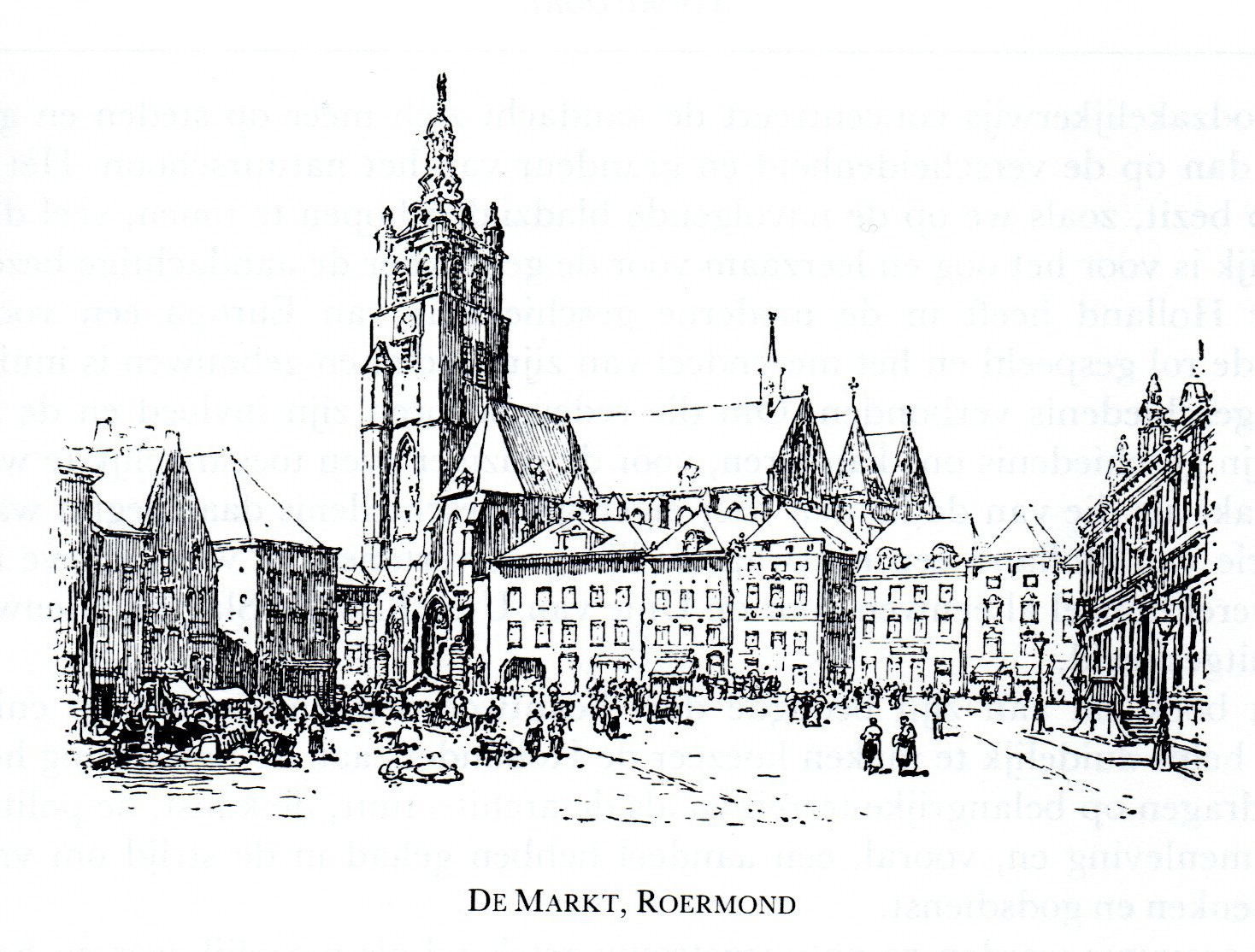
Richard Lovett (1887), Marketplace in Roermond

On 11 December 1792, during the French Revolutionary Wars, the French under General Miranda conquered Roermond, but by 5 March 1793, the city was under Habsburg control again. The city was again occupied by the French on 5 April 1794 and officially became part of the French département Meuse-Inférieure from 1795 to 1814. In 1814, during the War of the Sixth Coalition, Roermond was liberated by the Russians.

=== Kingdom of the Netherlands ===
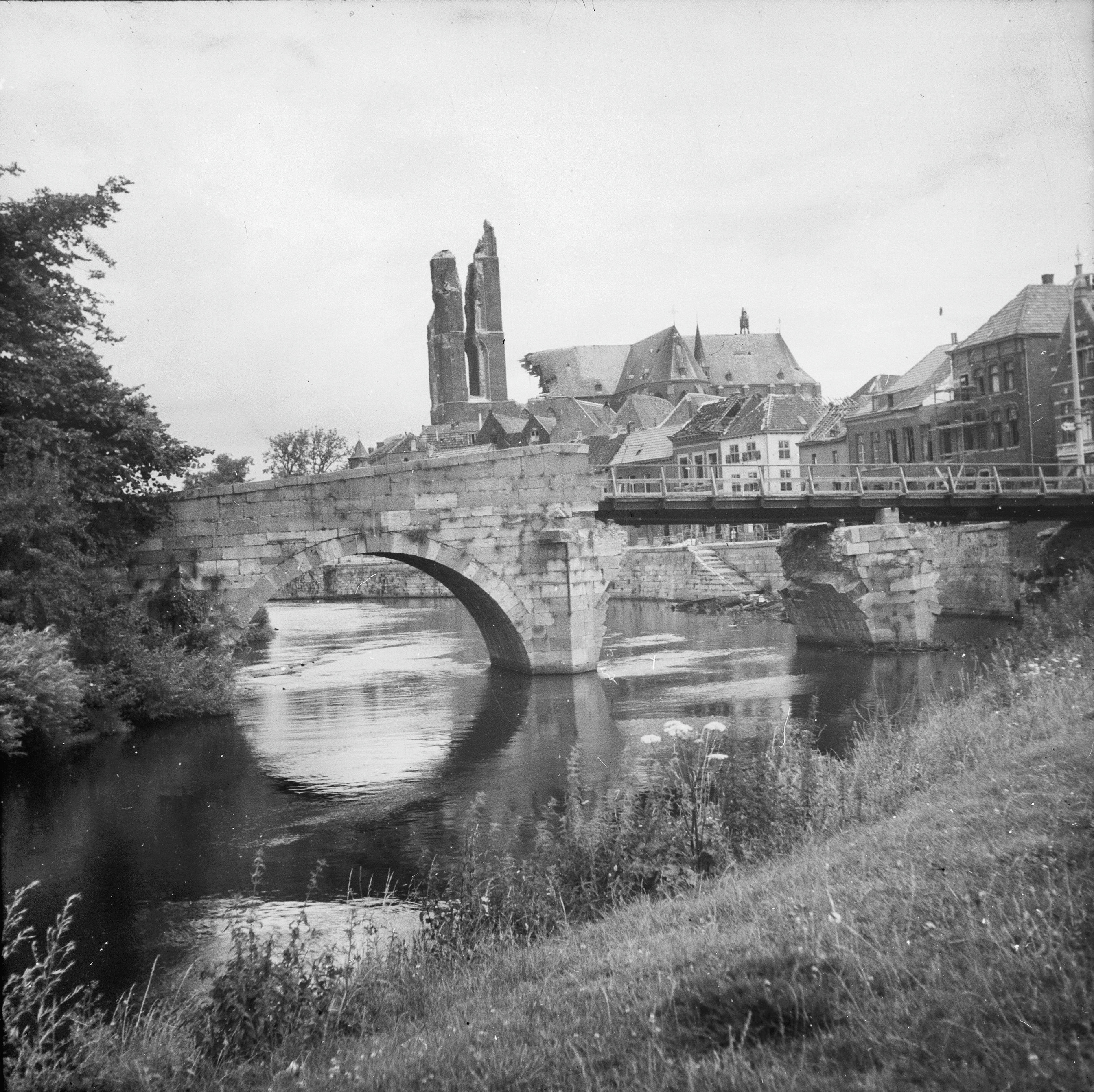
Roermond in 1945 with the heavily damaged St. Christopher's Cathedral in the background

After the Anglo-Dutch Treaty of 1814, Roermond became part of the new Kingdom of the Netherlands. The new province was to receive the name "Maastricht", after its capital. King William, who did not want the name Limburg to be lost, insisted that the name be changed to Limburg. As such, the name of the new province derived from the old Duchy of Limburg that had existed until 1648 within the triangle Maastricht – Liège – Aachen.

When the Netherlands and Belgium separated in 1830, there was support for adding Limburg to Belgium, but in the end (1839) the province was divided in two, with the eastern part going to the Netherlands and the western part to Belgium. From then on, Dutch Limburg was, the new Duchy of Limburg, also part of the German Confederation.

During World War II, the Germans occupied Roermond from 1940 to 1945. On 1 March 1945 the town was liberated by the Recce Troop of the 35th US Infantry Division during Operation Grenade. By the time of liberation, 90% of all buildings were either damaged or destroyed. Restoration returned the old town centre to its full glory.

On 1 May 1988 the Provisional Irish Republican Army (IRA) killed three British airmen and injured three others in a double attack. IRA members opened fire on a car in Roermond with Royal Air Force airmen, killing Ian Shinner. Half an hour later, a second attack elsewhere, in Nieuw-Bergen, killed two British airmen and injured another.

In a separate attack two years later two Australian nationals were killed. The two men were lawyers on holiday, whom the IRA shot believing they were off-duty British Army soldiers. Australian Prime Minister Bob Hawke denounced the IRA explanation saying 'This sort of warped logic of war casualties adds insult to a mortal injury,' and a later Prime Minister John Howard refused to meet Gerry Adams from Sinn Féin on a visit to Australia in 2000.

On 13 April 1992, a magnitude 5.4 earthquake occurred near the town of Roermond at a focal depth of about 17 km (11 mi). This earthquake was the strongest seismic event in Western Europe since 1756. Following this earthquake, the water levels of numerous wells located in the Lower Rhine Embayment showed significant coseismic anomalies. The Roer Valley, which crosses three countries (Belgium, The Netherlands, and Germany), is bounded by two north-northwest, south-southeast trending Quaternary normal fault systems. The eastern boundary is defined by the Peel boundary fault, along which the 1992 Roermond earthquake occurred, and the western boundary is defined by the Feldbiss fault zone, which is partly located in Belgium. Evidence of recent tectonic activity along the Feldbiss fault zone is visible on seismic profiles that show more than 600 m of offset in Neogene deposits. Although Ahorner demonstrated the existence of the Rhenish seismic zones and recommended a comprehensive analysis of Quaternary structures and background seismicity, coseismic movements were considered to be improbable and active faults remain largely unidentified.

== Geography ==
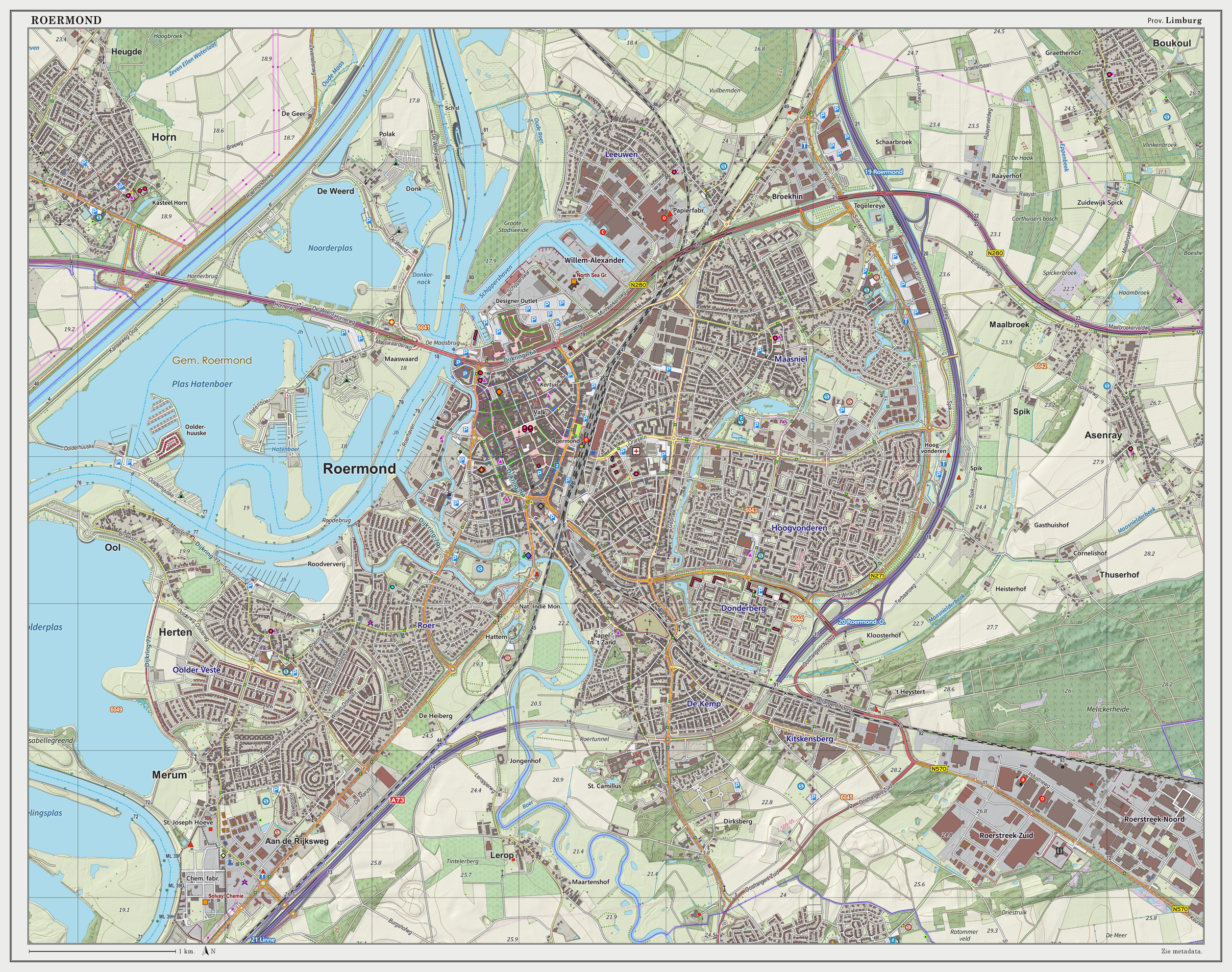
Dutch Topographic map of Roermond (town), as of March 2014

Roermond is situated in the middle of the province of Limburg, which is bordered by the river Maas to the west and Germany to the east.

=== Population centres ===
The community of Roermond consists of the following population centres:

- Roermond
- Asenray
- Asselt
- Boukoul
- Herten
- Leeuwen
- Maasniel
- Merum (Roermond)
- Ool
- Swalmen

=== Climate ===
Climate data for Ell (extremes 1999–)
Month	Jan	Feb	Mar	Apr	May	Jun	Jul	Aug	Sep	Oct	Nov	Dec	Year
Record high °C (°F)	15.6 (60.1)	17.4 (63.3)	23.2 (73.8)	28.9 (84.0)	33.1 (91.6)	34.6 (94.3)	39.2 (102.6)	37.0 (98.6)	32.7 (90.9)	25.9 (78.6)	22.0 (71.6)	16.0 (60.8)	39.2 (102.6)
Daily mean °C (°F)	3.1 (37.6)	4.0 (39.2)	6.4 (43.5)	10.2 (50.4)	14.2 (57.6)	17.0 (62.6)	18.4 (65.1)	17.6 (63.7)	14.9 (58.8)	11.0 (51.8)	7.1 (44.8)	3.2 (37.8)	10.6 (51.1)
Record low °C (°F)	−20.8 (−5.4)	−16.2 (2.8)	−13.3 (8.1)	−4.6 (23.7)	−0.2 (31.6)	3.1 (37.6)	4.5 (40.1)	3.5 (38.3)	0.4 (32.7)	−6.4 (20.5)	−6.7 (19.9)	−15.0 (5.0)	−20.8 (−5.4)
Source: Royal Netherlands Meteorological Institute (1971–2000 extremes)

=== Nature and recreation ===
Roermond is encircled by a green belt, which offers many opportunities for hiking and cycling. To the east, nature reserves, such as the Meinweg National Park, the valley of the Leu (Leudal), and the Swalm and Roer rivers provide woodlands, heath and meadows. The Meinweg also contains a small amount of wildlife, including a small group of vipers, the only venomous snake to live in the Netherlands. To the west, the river Meuse and its lake area, known as "Maasplassen", offer opportunities for water recreation.

=== Floods ===
As a town near to and surrounded by water and close to two rivers, the Meuse and the Roer, Roermond often has to defend itself against floods. The worst floods were in 1993 and 1995.

Year	Water level (mNAP)	At	Damage	Remarks
December 1643	49.7	Maastricht		Highest level ever in Limburg
December 1880	20.71	Roermond		
March 1910	46.1	Maastricht		
March 1920	20.6	Roermond		
January 1926	42.92	Maastricht	80 million Dutch guilders damage, 14,000 refugees	Largest flood disaster in Limburg, breakthrough of dikes
July 1980		Roermond		
1984		Roermond		
December 1993	45.8	Borgharen	245 million guilders damage	
January 1995	45.71	Borgharen	500 million guilders damage, 210,000 people evacuated	Longest high water ever in Limburg

== Economy ==
Though Roermond grew and expanded steadily over the years, it was not until the start of the 21st century that Roermond saw another economic boost. This recent growth was mainly caused by the construction of the highway A73 circling Roermond on the east side. The highway was planned to open in January 2007 with the 2.5 km (1.6 mi) long Roertunnel leading traffic underneath a part of the city and the shorter Swalmertunnel underneath Swalmen. However, due to delays the tunnels only opened with a single carriageway available and frequent closures. The tunnels grew infamous during the first weeks when numerous closures due to technical problems caused constant traffic jams. The tunnels are now fully operational. Another highway connection under construction is the German autobahn A52. The last 6 km (4 mi) stretch from Düsseldorf to the German-Dutch border upon completion leads from Roermond straight to Düsseldorf.

As of 2010, the city itself had a fairly high unemployment rate of 10.7% and the average income was lower than the national average, despite an above-average economy in the region and an influx of new residents.

== Crime ==
In 2007, Roermond was ranked as the third most criminal place in the Netherlands, outscoring Amsterdam. In 2007, Roermond managed to improve its reputation, dropping to 9th place (though this figure is combined with the district of Swalmen, which had its own score in 2006). Efforts are being put in place to limit petty crime (especially car break-ins and house burglaries). In 2013, Roermond was in 13th place. In 2018, Roermond had risen again to 9th place.

== Culture ==
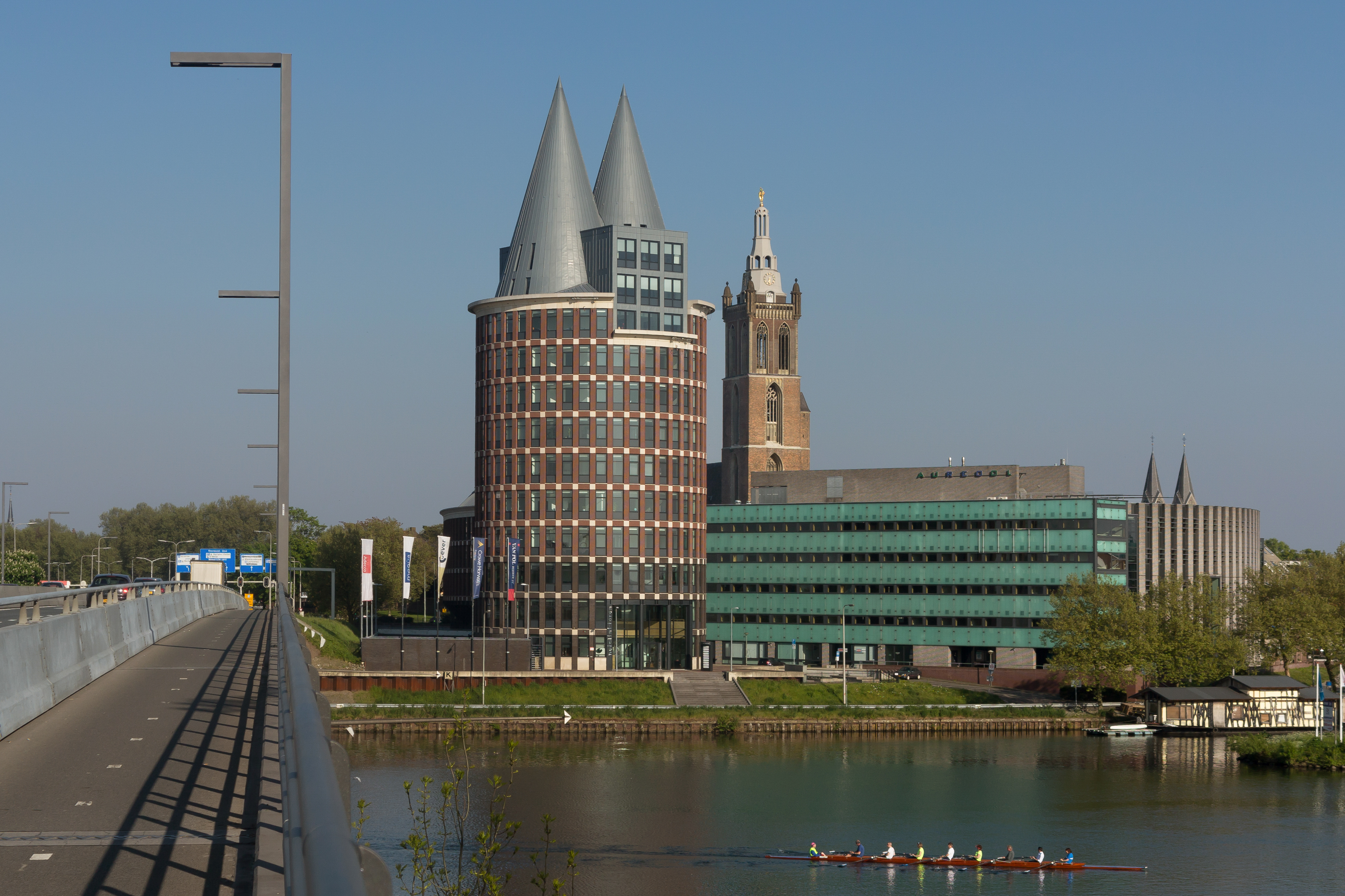
The Natalini tower and the cathedral in the background

=== Events ===
Roermond hosts several festivals, including a Liberation Day festival on 5 May and the dance festival Solar Weekend.

=== Anthem ===
Roermond has had its own anthem since 1912. The text was written by A. F. van Beurden, the music is by H. Tijssen, who also composed the Limburg Anthem (Waar in 't bronsgroen eikenhout).

In everyday life in Limburg around 1900, the Dutch language was of less importance. Everything was done in Limburgs. Newspapers in the 19th century were sometimes written in German, and in some parts of Limburg German was the language used in church and education. In this time Maastricht still had a very strong connection with French-speaking areas around Liège. Van Beurden's poem was used to force the people of Limburg into speaking Dutch. Proof of this is the very un-Limburg part in the anthem, the reference to the Dutch Royal family. In 1900 the people in Limburg had to swear their allegiance to the Dutch royal family of the House of Orange-Nassau in a "aanhankelijkheidsverklaring aan het Oranjehuis" and had to start using Dutch instead of Limburgs.

=== Sports ===
The handball team HV Swift Roermond has won the Dutch Championship several times, but was dispanded in 2000. The Futsal team Tigers Roermond are the two-time reigning champions of The Netherlands.

== Attractions ==
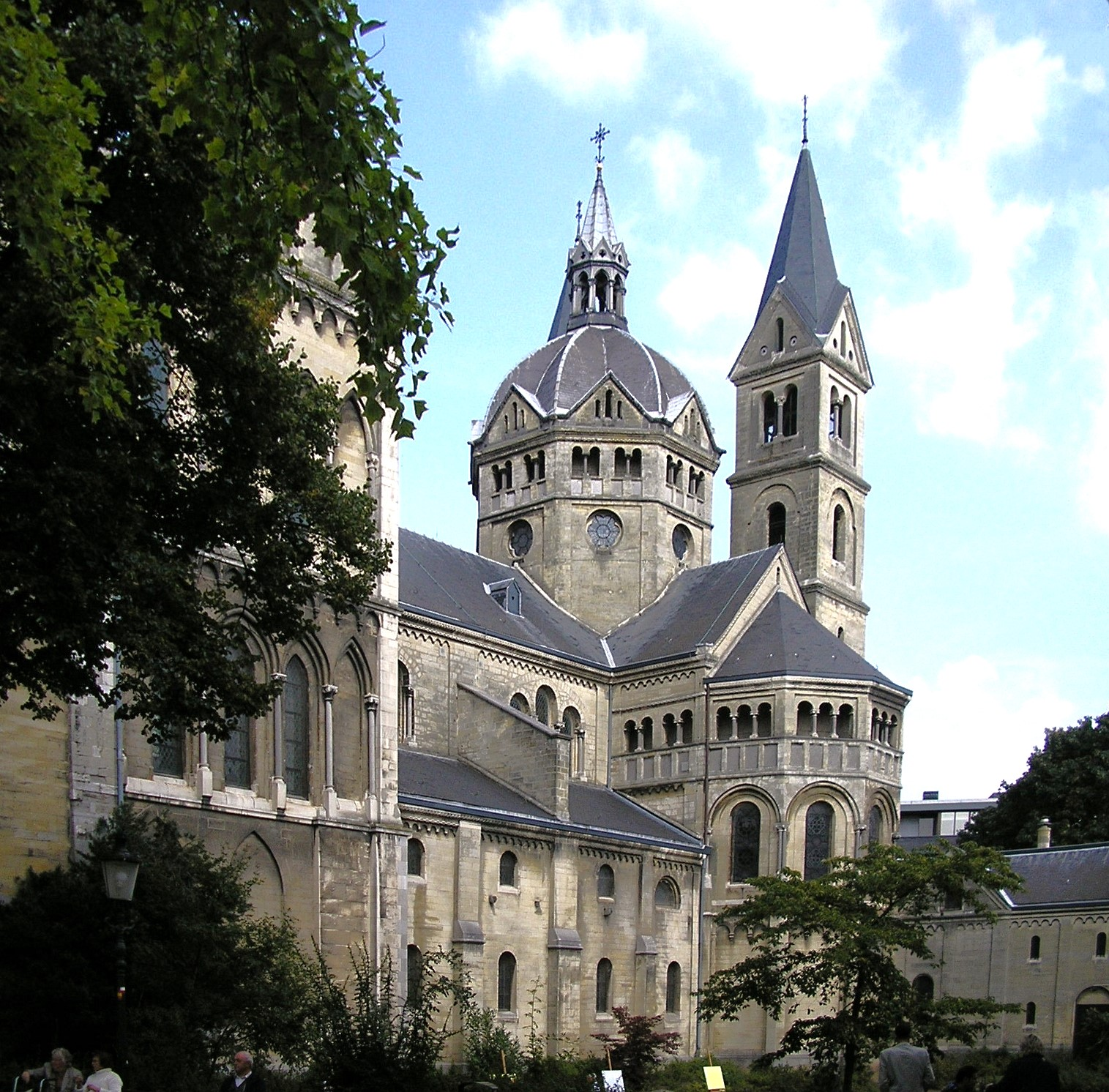
Munsterkerk in 2008

Roermond's old town centre is home to several historic monuments, including:

- Carolus Chapel
- Cuypershuis
- Kapel in 't Zand
- Kasteel Hattem
- Munsterkerk
- National Indiëmonument
- Rattentoren
- Roermond City Hall
- St. Christopher's Cathedral

== Infrastructure ==
Access roads to Roermond have been upgraded recently, providing direct access to the Dutch and German highway networks. From north to south the A73 (Maastricht-Nijmegen) passes east of the city, partly through tunnels. Eastwards the German A52 leads to Düsseldorf. Westbound the provincial road N280 leads towards Weert and connects to the A2 towards Eindhoven.

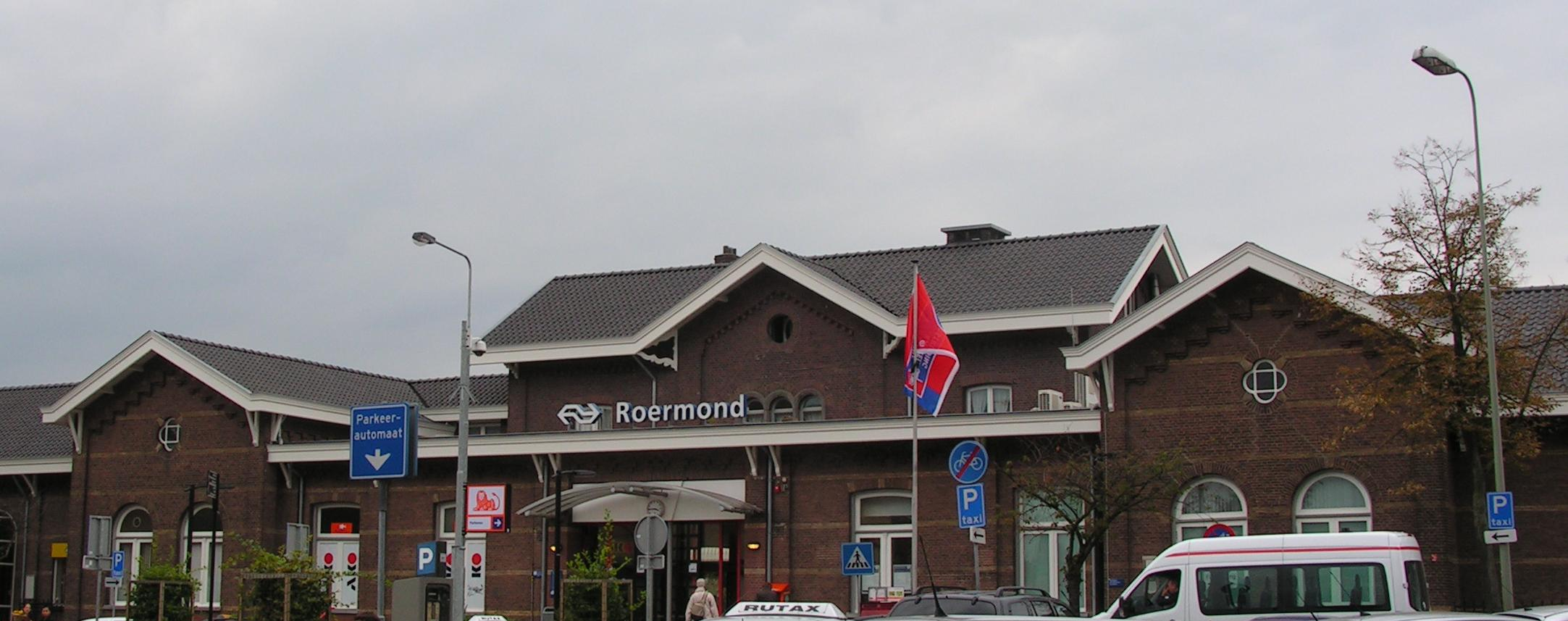
Roermond railway station in 2007

Roermond has a train station with quarter-hourly fast trains across the country to:

- Southbound: Sittard-Maastricht-Heerlen
- Northwestbound: Weert-Eindhoven onwards to Amsterdam.

In addition, there are commuter trains with half-hourly service to:

- Northeastbound: Venlo-Nijmegen
- Southbound: Sittard-Maastricht

The municipality of Swalmen also has a railway station serving commuter trains on the line Roermond-Venlo twice hourly.

For regional transport, there is a bus station with municipal and regional lines to nearby villages and towns. There used to be a bus service to Heinsberg in Germany, which was terminated in December 2008. Flixbus operates long-distance busses from two different locations in the city.

The city does not have its own airport, the nearest airport is Maastricht Aachen Airport, located approximately 35 km south of the city. Other airports within a reasonable distance include Eindhoven Airport which is 50.7 km away, Düsseldorf Airport which is 54.9 km, and Cologne Bonn Airport is also 86.8 km away from Roermond. Amsterdam's Schiphol Airport is located 181 km west of Roermond.

== Notable people ==
=== Public thinking & public service ===
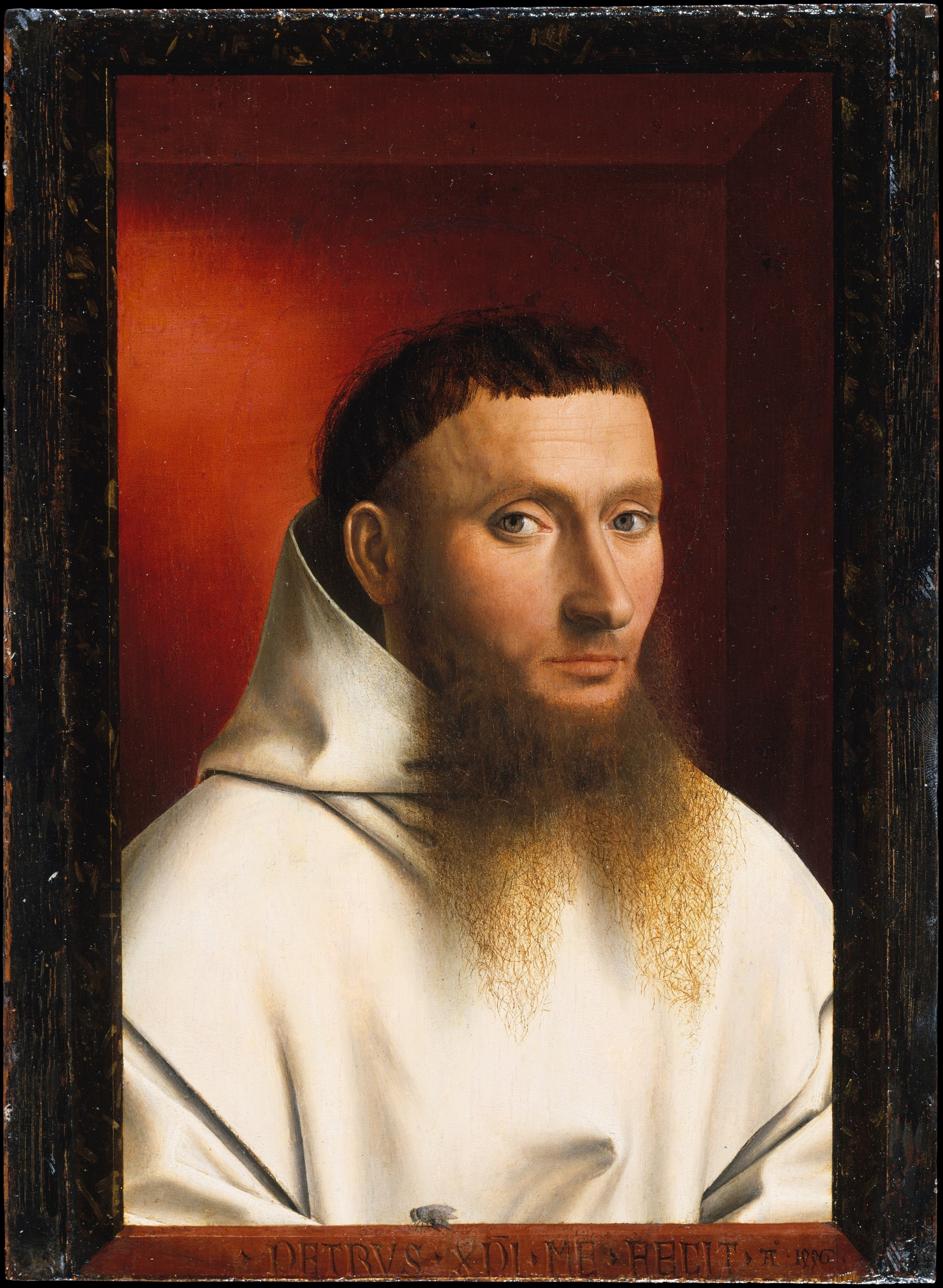
Portrait of a Carthusian, 1446; Denis the Carthusian

- Richardis of Bavaria (1173–1231), a German noblewoman and abbess, daughter of Otto I, Duke of Bavaria and mother of Gerard III, Count of Guelders
- Gerard III, Count of Guelders (1185–1229), a Count of Guelders and Zutphen
- Denis the Carthusian (1402–1471), a Roman Catholic theologian and mystic
- Johannes Murmellius (ca.1480–1517), a teacher and humanist
- Jacob Chimarrhaeus (1542–1614), grand almoner to Rudolf II, Holy Roman Emperor
- Aelius Everhardus Vorstius (1565–1624), Physician, botanist
- François Vincent Henri Antoine de Stuers (1792–1881), a Dutch general, commander of the Indies army
- Hubert Joseph Jean Lambert de Stuers (1788–1861), a soldier in the Royal Netherlands East Indies Army
- Pierre Cuypers (1827–1921), an architect
- Eduard Cuypers (1859–1927), a Dutch architect in Amsterdam and the Dutch East Indies
- Richard Schoemaker (1886–1942 in Sachsenhausen), a Dutch Olympic fencer, engineer in the Royal Netherlands East Indies Army, academic architect and executed resistance group leader
- Charles Ruijs de Beerenbrouck (1873–1936), Prime Minister of the Netherlands 1918/1925
- Louis Beel (1902–1977), Prime Minister of the Netherlands 1946/1948 & 1958/1959
- Jo Cals (1914–1971), Prime Minister of the Netherlands 1965/1966

=== The arts ===
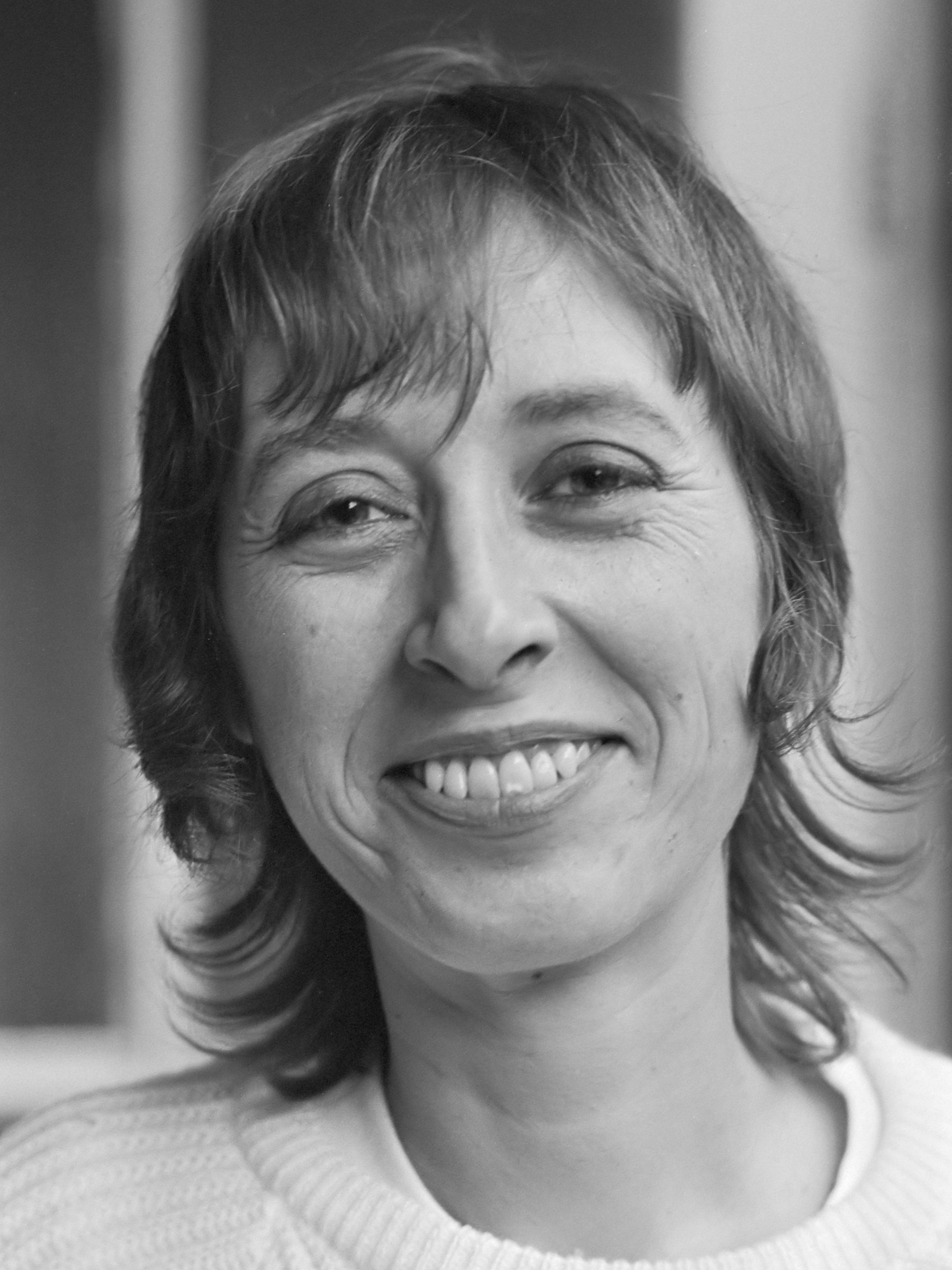
Marleen Gorris, 1982

- Christoffel Puytlinck (1640–1680), a still life painter
- Jan Baptist Herregouts (1640–1721), a painter
- Jan Frans van Douven (1656–1727), a painter
- Maximilian Herregouts (fl. 1674), a painter
- Henri Linssen (1805–1869), a painter
- Henry Luyten (1859–1945), a Dutch-born Belgian painter
- Louis Raemaekers (1869–1956), a painter and editorial cartoonist
- Jacob Hiegentlich (1907–1940), a gay Dutch poet
- Leo Ketelaars (1903-1992), violinist and baritone
- Willem Hofhuizen (1915–1986), a Dutch expressionist painter
- Margriet Windhausen (born 1942), a sculptor and painter
- Marleen Gorris (born 1948), a writer and film director
- Claudy Jongstra (born 1963), artist and textile designer
- Erik Kessels (born 1966), an artist, designer and curator; creative director of KesselsKramer
- Samantha van Wissen (born 1970), a Dutch dancer
- Jo Luijten (born 1978), a Dutch comedy video artist & video game developer
- Stefanie Joosten (born 1988), a model, singer and actress living in Japan
- Timor Steffens (born 1987), a dancer and choreographer

=== Sport ===
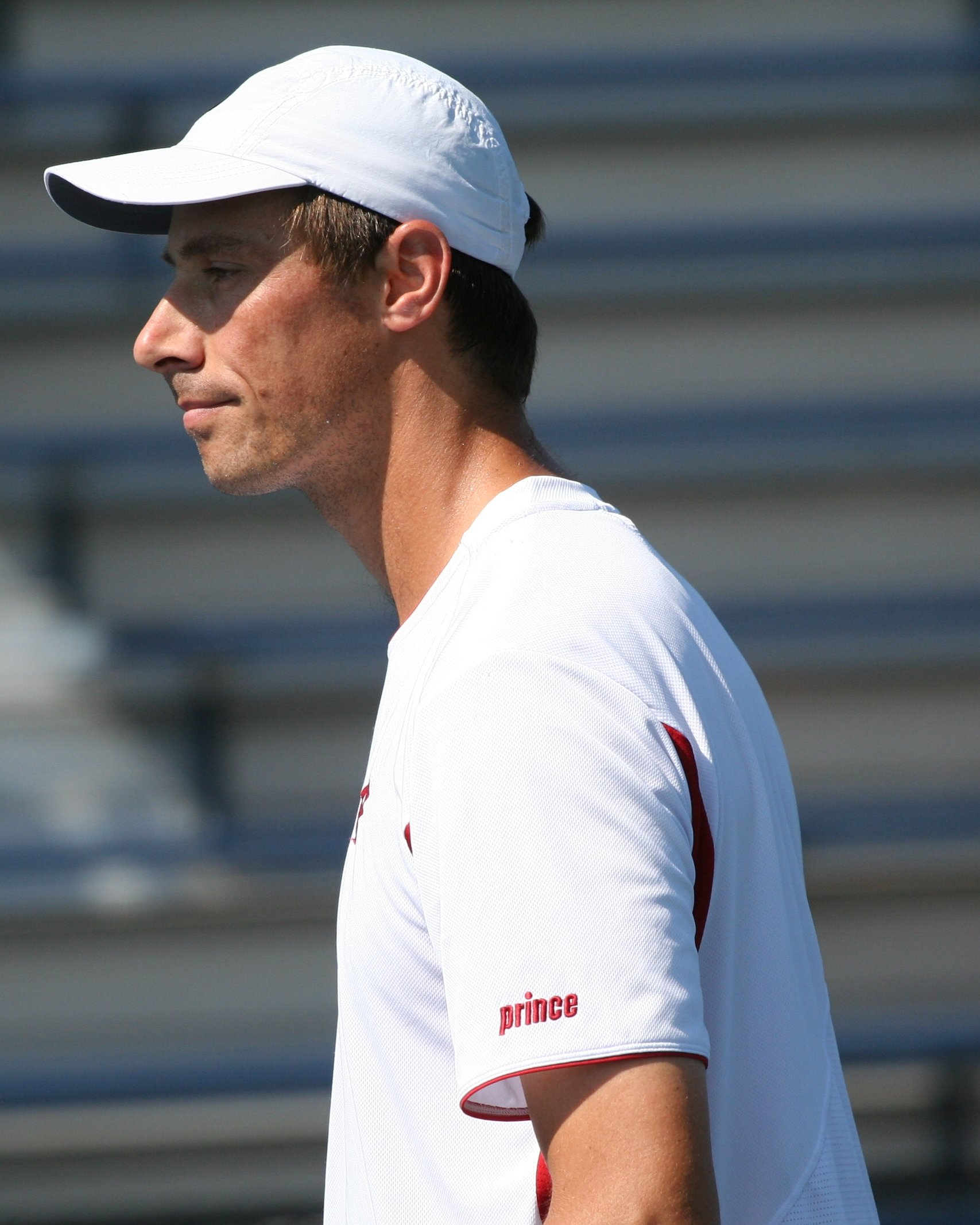
Rogier Wassen, 2009

- Pierre Massy (1900–1958), a Dutch footballer
- Joop Campioni (1901–1962), a Dutch footballer
- Harry Schreurs (1901–1973), a Dutch footballer
- Roger Reijners (born 1964), a Dutch football coach and former player with 326 club caps
- Anna Wood (born 1966), a Dutch-born Australian sprint canoeist competed in four Summer Olympics, won bronze medals at the 1988 (for NL) and 1996 Summer Olympics (for Aus)
- Asker Jeukendrup (born 1969), a Dutch sports nutrition scientist and an Ironman triathlete
- Rogier Wassen (born 1976), a tennis player
- Jos Menten (born 1981), a racing driver
- Harrie Gommans (born 1983), a footballer with 262 club caps
- Rico Vonck (born 1987), a former darts player
- Britt Bongaerts (Born 1996), a Dutch volleyball player

=== Celebrities ===
- Jelly (born 1996), a YouTuber with over 23.5 million subscribers on YouTube

== Sources ==
- Johnston, A. C., "Seismic moment assessment of earthquakes in stable continental regions", II, Historical seismicity, Geophys. J. Int., 125, 639, 1996.
- Geluk, M. C., E. J. T. Duin, M. Dusar, R. H. B. Rijkers, M. W. van Den Berg, and P. van Rooijen, "Stratigraphy and tectonics of the Roer Valley Graben", Geol. Mijnbouw, 73, 129, 1994.
- Paulissen, E., J. Vandenberghe, and F. Gullentops, "The Feldbiss fault in the Maas Valley bottom (Limburg, Belgium)", Geol. Mijnbouw, 64, 79, 1985.
- Rosenhauer, W., and L. Ahorner, "Seismic hazard assessment for the Lower Rhine Embayment before and after the 1992 Roermond earthquake", Geol. Mijnbouw, 73, 415, 1994.
- van den Berg, M.W., "Neotectonics of the Roer Valley rift system. Style and rate of crustal deformation inferred from syn-tectonic sedimentation", Geol. Mijnbouw, 73, 143, 1994.
- van den Berg, M.W., et al., "Patterns and velocities of recent crustal movements in the Dutch part of the Roer Valley rift system", Geol. Mijnbouw, 73, 157, 1994.
