= Izaak Godijn =

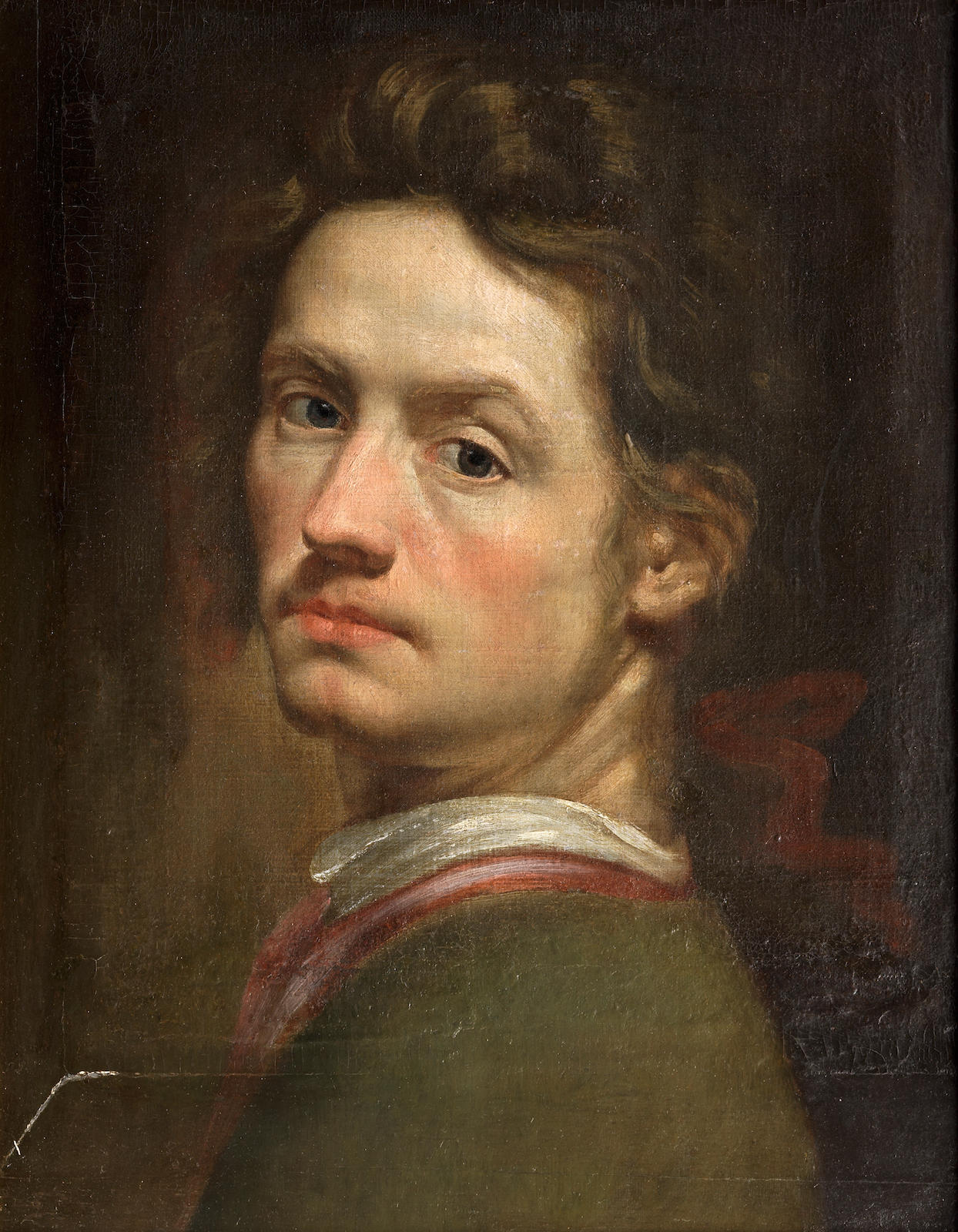
Self-portrait

Izaak Godijn or Izaak Godyn (c. 1660 – after 1712) was a Flemish painter who, after a stay in Italy, spent most of his known artistic career as a court painter in Prague. He produced magnificent Baroque frescos and hunting still lifes. He is credited with introducing the Baroque Netherlandish tradition of hunting pieces into Bohemia.

== Life ==
Details about his life are scarce. Izaak Godijn was probably born around 1660 in Antwerp. He is believed to be the younger brother of the painter Abraham Godijn or Abraham Godyn who studied under the prominent history painter Hendrik Herregouts. It is not clear with whom Izaak studied but it is assumed he trained initially in Antwerp.

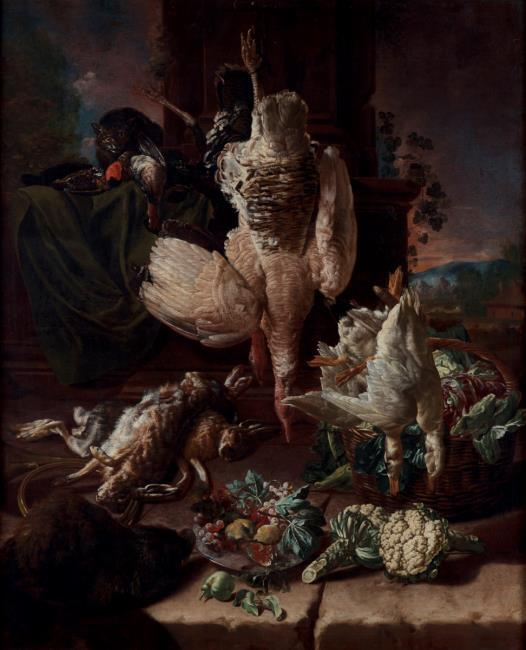
Still life with poultry, vegetables and fruit

He travelled likely in the company of Abraham Godijn to Italy. He moved in 1690 to Prague, where he joined Abraham Godijn. Here he worked as a court painter. He worked together with Abraham Goddijn on a commission to paint frescos in the Troja Palace in Prague. They were part of a group of artists who worked from 1687 to 1693 for Count Wenzel Adalbert von Sternberg on the decoration of the Troja Palace in Prague. This group included Flemish artists such as Johann Baptiste Bouttats.

After Abraham Godijn returned to Antwerp, Izaak was in Prague employed as a court painter to Count Wenzel Adalbert von Sternberg from 1693 to 1712. In 1700 he married in Prague. From 1703 onwards he attempted to become a member of the painter's guild of Malá Strana in Prague but was not successful. A statement by Count von Sternberg that Godijn was his court painter was likely the reason for this failure. Izaak was still documented in Prague in 1708.

The date and place of his death are not known but it is presumed he died in Prague after 1712.

== Work ==
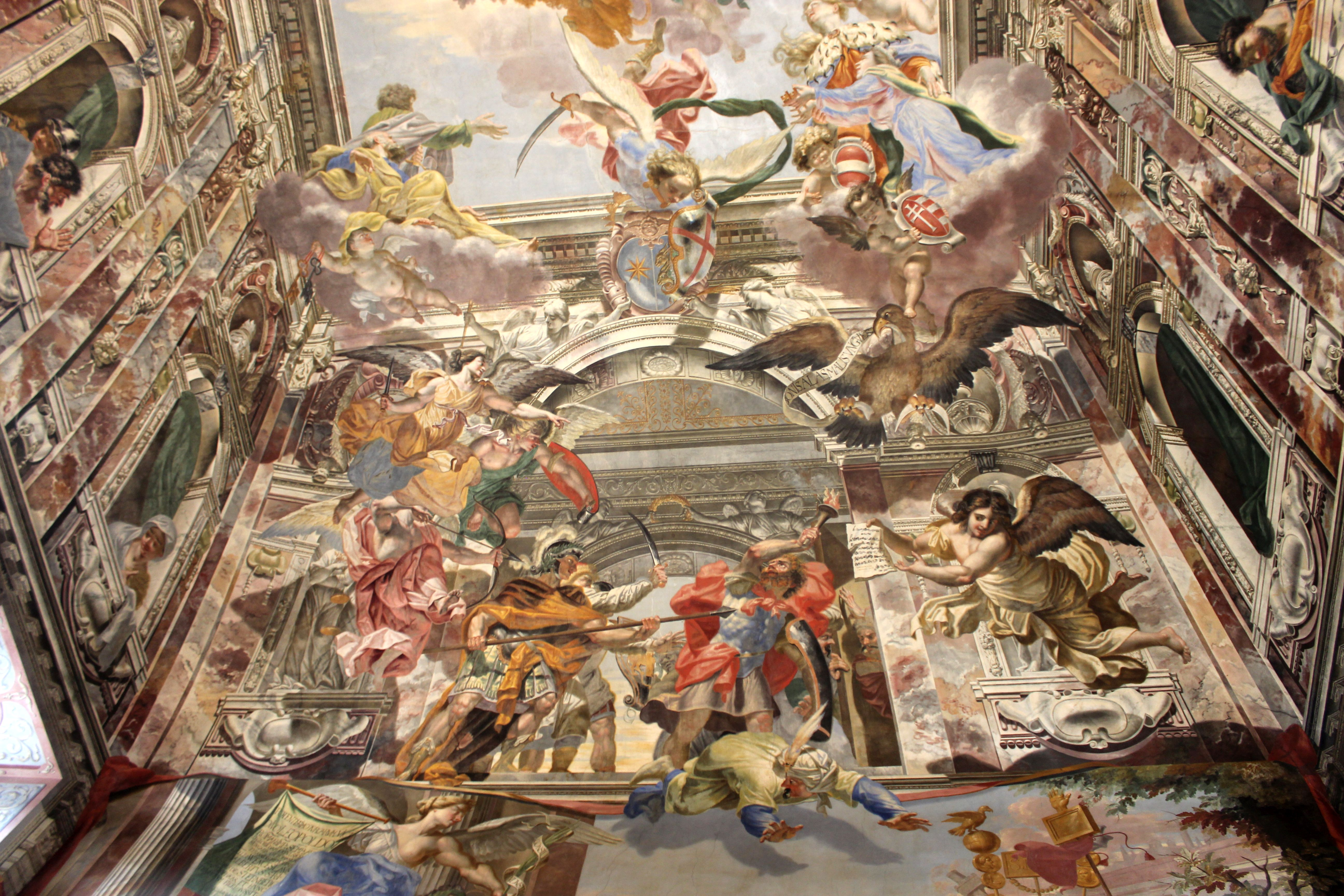
Janus temple, Troja Palace fresco

Izaak Godijn collaborated with Abraham Godijn on the frescos which Count von Sternberg commissioned to be painted in the main room of the Troja Castle. The paintings are considered to be among the best examples of Baroque fresco painting in Northern Europe. The frescos use illusionist effects and narrate in a triumphalist way the history of the Habsburg Dynasty. The design follows the Baroque schema of architectural symbolism whereby the ceiling depicts the celestial world and the walls the terrestrial world. The ceiling is decorated with celestial beings that were said to protect the Habsburg territories. Underneath the curved surfaces below the ceiling, angels and putti are floating before trompe-l'œil architecture showing scenes from Habsburg history. The walls depict the terrestrial world with one of the scenes on the shorter walls celebrating the victory of Leopold I, Holy Roman Emperor over the Turks. In one scene we see the trompe-l'œil effect of a Turk falling down with his arms outstretched while his shadow is reflected on the painting (see illustration). The longer wall holds statues or busts of the Habsburg rulers in grisaille. The fresco programme achieved a sophisticated and complex synthesis of a fictionalist painting of architecture and lively figural scenes. The exact contribution of Izaak to this decorative program has yet to be clarified.

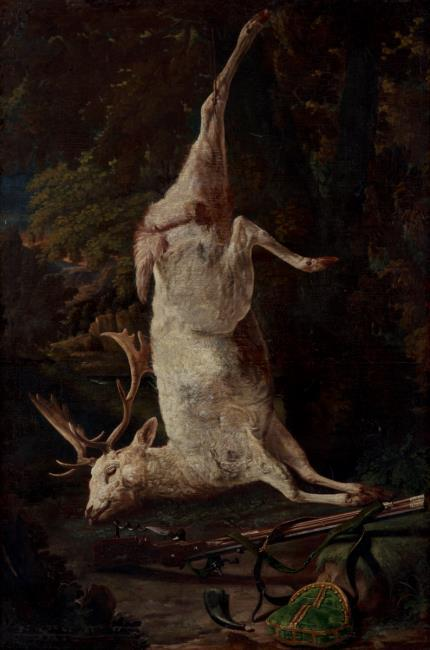
Hunting still life with deer

As Izaak's participation in the paintings in the castle of Troja is not documented, he is now mainly recognised for his introduction of the hunting still life into Bohemia. It is possible that Abraham Goddijn also played a role in this introduction of the Netherlandish type of hunting trophy images. Izaak is known to have painted many images of hunting trophies for the noble families von Sternberg, Czernin and Kolowrat. Representative of his work in this genre is the extensive collection in the Kolowrat Gallery (Rychnov nad Kněžnou Castle). His hunting pieces drew inspiration from the works of Frans Snyders in their sumptuousness and decorative aspect and from those of Jacobus Victors and Melchior de Hondecoeter in their overall conception and use of the landscape. In the Flemish tradition he created a dramatic effect in his hunting pieces. He continued the late Baroque's use of dramatic composition and lighting. In his compositions he placed the brightly illuminated prey in front of a gloomy landscape or a dark kitchen interior.
