= Flemish painting =

Painting style from the County of Flanders

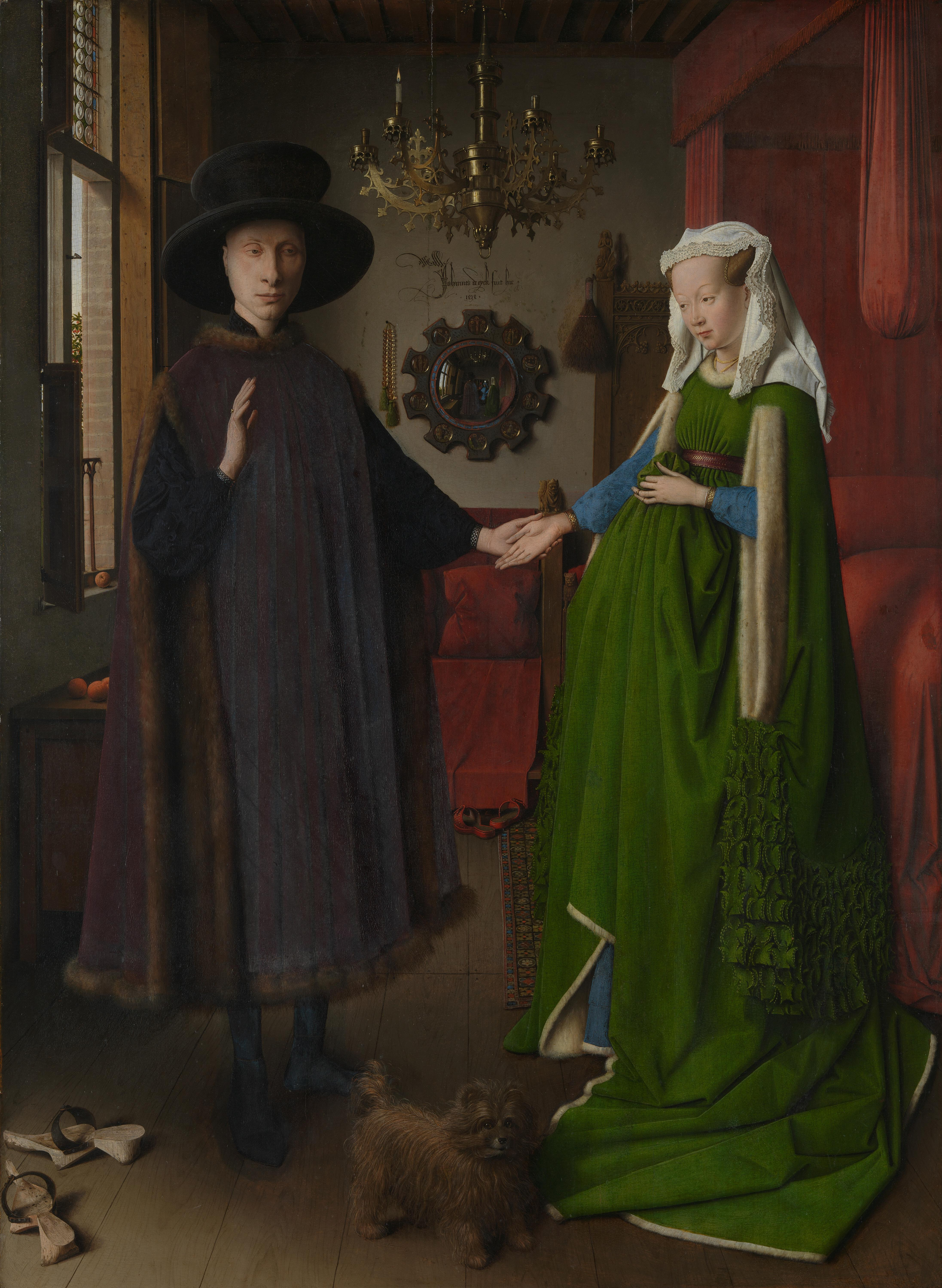
The Arnolfini Portrait by Jan van Eyck, 1434

Flemish painting flourished from the early 15th century until the 17th century, gradually becoming distinct from the painting of the rest of the Low Countries, especially the modern Netherlands. In the early period, up to about 1520, the painting of the whole area is (especially in the Anglophone world) typically considered as a whole, as Early Netherlandish painting. This was dominated by the Flemish south, but painters from the north were also important. Dutch and Flemish Renaissance painting, of which Antwerp became the centre, covers the period up to about 1580 or later, by the end of which the north and south Netherlands had become politically separated. Flemish Baroque painting was especially important in the first half of the 17th century, dominated by Rubens.

In theory the term does not refer to modern Flanders but to the County of Flanders and neighbouring areas of the Low Countries such as the Tournaisis and Duchy of Brabant. However this distinction, well understood in modern Belgium, has always been disregarded by most foreign observers and writers. Flanders delivered the leading painters in Northern Europe and attracted many promising young painters from other countries. These painters were invited to work at foreign courts and had a Europe-wide influence. Since the end of the Napoleonic era, Flemish painters have again been contributing to a reputation that had been set by the Old Masters.

The Franco-Flemish School of musical composition flourished beginning at about the same time.

== Late Gothic ==
The so-called Flemish Primitives were the first to popularize the use of oil paint. Their art has its origins in the miniature painting of the late Gothic period. Chief among them were Jan van Eyck, Hans Memling, Hugo van der Goes, Robert Campin and Rogier van der Weyden. The court of the Duchy of Burgundy was an important source of patronage.

== Renaissance ==
From the early 16th century, the Italian Renaissance started to influence the Flemish painters. The result was very different from the typical Italian Renaissance painting. The leading artist was Pieter Brueghel the Elder, who avoided direct Italian influence, unlike the Northern Mannerists.

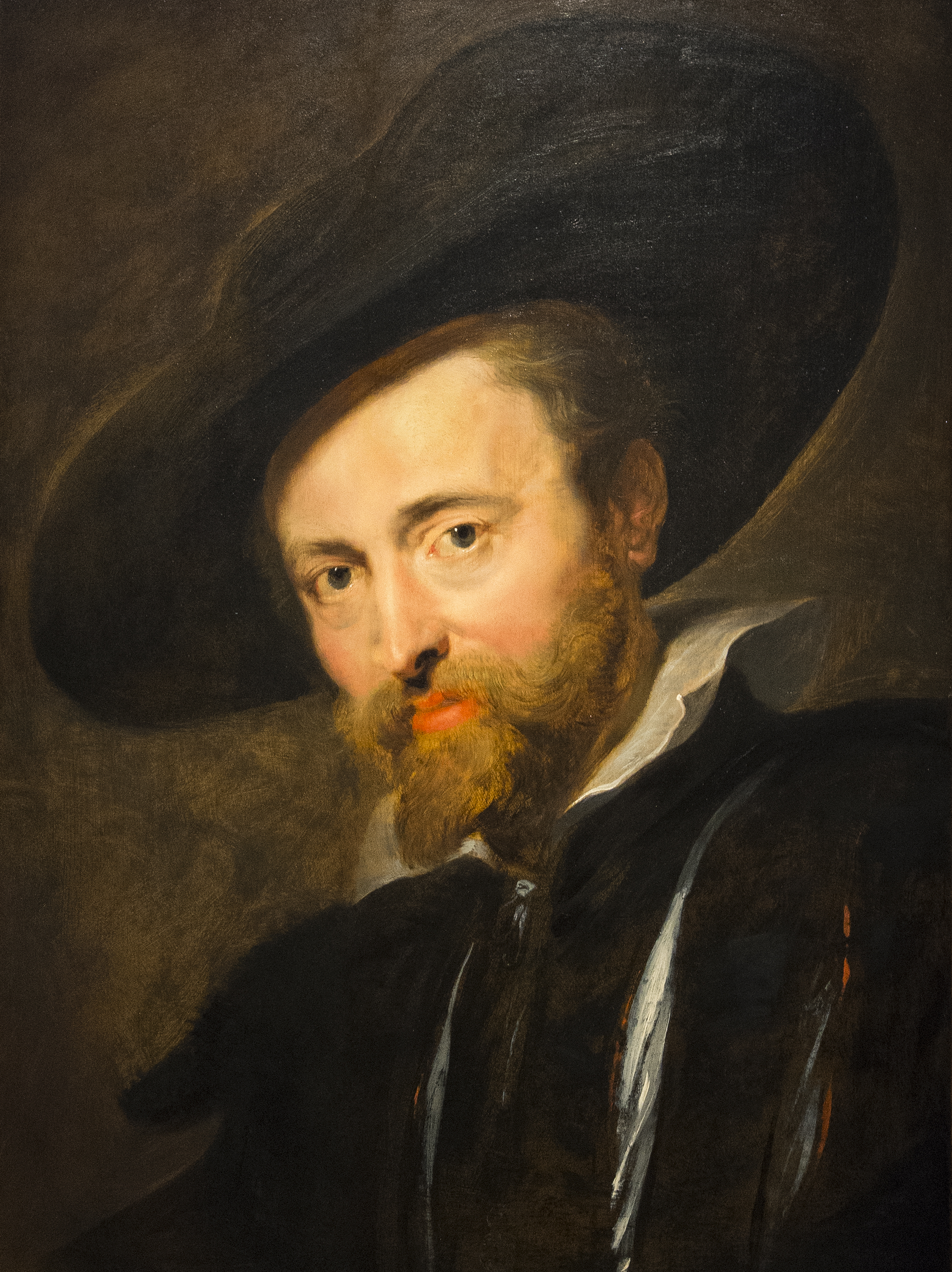
Peter Paul Rubens, self-portrait

== Baroque ==
After the Siege of Antwerp (1584–1585), the Southern Provinces of the Netherlands ("Flanders") remained under Spanish rule and were separated from the independent Dutch Republic. Although many artists fled the religious wars and moved from the Southern Netherlands to the Dutch Republic (see Dutch Golden Age painting), Flemish Baroque painting flourished, especially in the Antwerp school, during the seventeenth century under Rubens, Anthony van Dyck, and Jacob Jordaens.

== Decline ==
Following the deaths of major artists like Rubens in 1640 and the end of the Eighty Years War in 1648, the cultural significance of Flanders declined.

== Revival ==
A revival of painting in this region came in the advent of the Belgian Revolution of 1830 and work around that time is often considered Flemish. The painters, who flourished in the aftermath of this patriotic period, are usually referred to as Belgian rather than Flemish. That kingdom comprising Flanders, often influences also more recent artists's categorization (see List of Belgian painters).

== See also ==
- Burgundian Netherlands
- Dutch Golden Age
- Early Renaissance painting
- Flemish Expressionism
- Guild of Romanists
- List of Flemish painters
- Northern Renaissance
- Spanish Netherlands
