= Prague-Troja =

Praha-Troja
- Municipal District of Prague
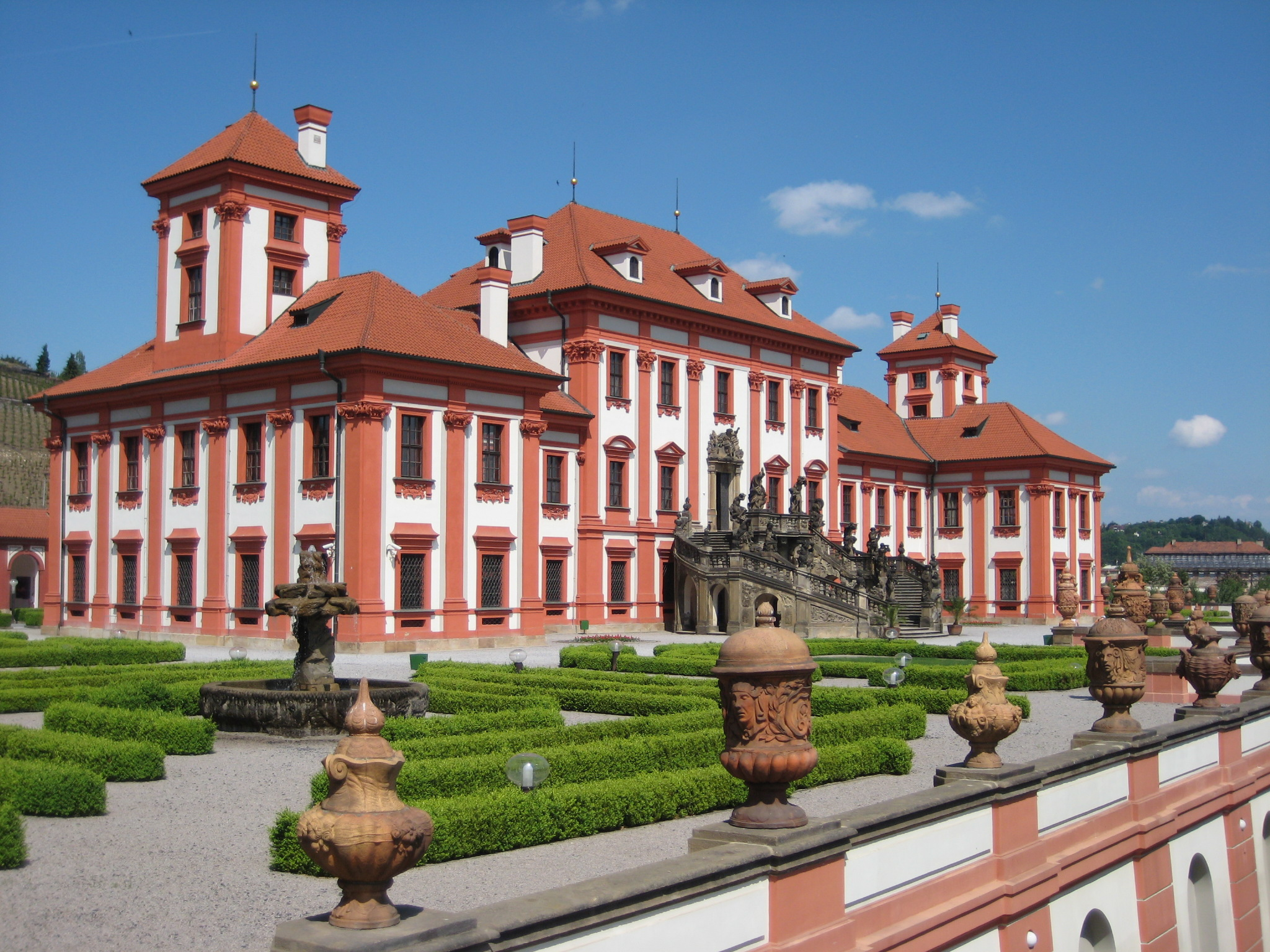
- Troja Palace

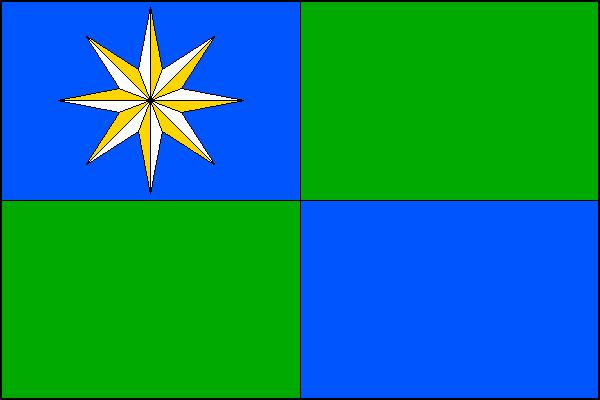
- Flag Coat of arms

- Location of Prague-Troja in Prague
- Coordinates: 50.11778°N 14.42389°E
- Country: Czech Republic
- Region: Prague
- Administrative district: Prague 7
- Municipal district: Prague 7

Area
  - Total: 3.36 km^{2} (1.30 sq mi)

Population (2021)
  - Total: 1,263
  - Density: 376/km^{2} (974/sq mi)
- Time zone: UTC+1 (CET)
  - Summer (DST): UTC+2 (CEST)
- Postal code: 171 00

Prague-Troja is a district in Prague, Czech Republic. It is situated in the northern part of the city, in the administrative district Prague 7. The cadastral area Troja is part of this district.
