= Abraham Godijn =

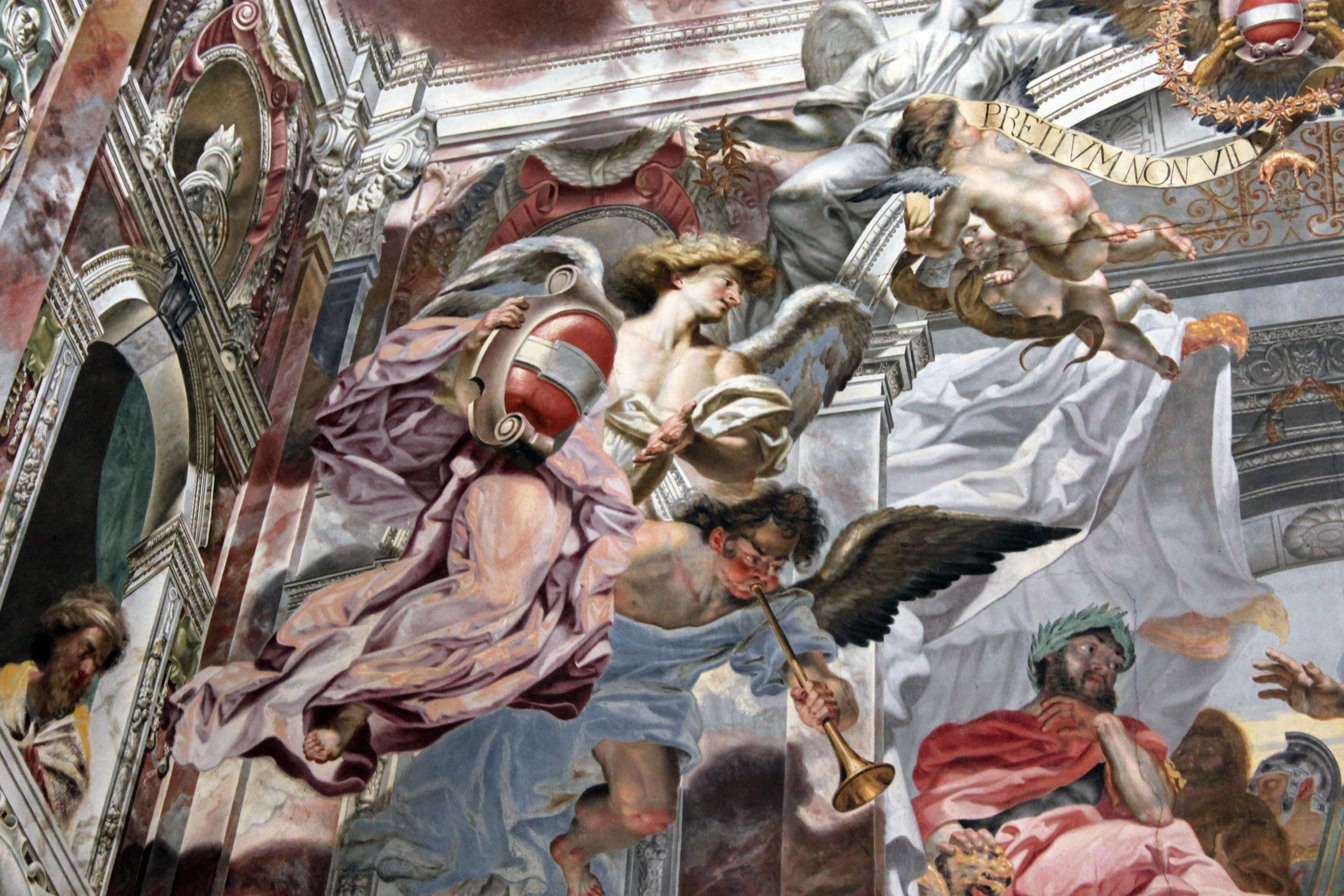
Order of the Golden Fleece, Troja Palace fresco

Abraham Godijn or Abraham Godyn (alternative spellings of family name: Goddijn and Abraham Goddyn) (1655/56 – after 1724) was a Flemish painter who, after a stay in Italy, worked for a time as a court painter in Prague where he produced magnificent Baroque frescos. He later returned to Antwerp.

== Life ==
Details about his life are scarce. Abraham Godijn was probably born in 1655 or 1656 in Antwerp where he studied under the prominent history painter Hendrik Herregouts. He became in 1681 a member of the 'Sodaliteit van de Bejaerde Jongmans', a fraternity for bachelors established by the Jesuit order. Not long thereafter he travelled to Italy. His work was well received in Rome where he became a court painter of the Pope and received the title of 'Painter of the Office of his Imperial and Catholic Majesty'.

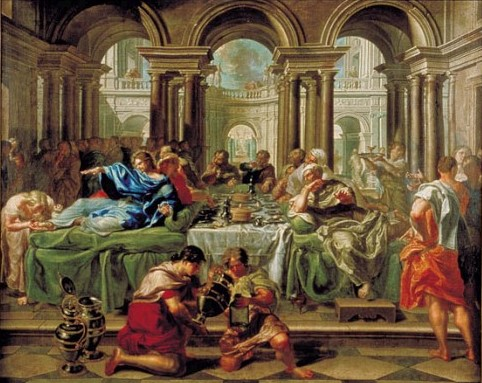
The Seven Sacraments, Penitence

He moved on to Prague in 1690 where he worked as a court painter until 1698. He received a commission to paint frescos in the Troja Palace in Prague on which he worked with his brother Izaak. They were part of a group of artists who worked in 1687 for Wenzel Albert Duke of Sternberg on the decoration of the Troja Palace in Prague. This group included Flemish artists such as Johann Baptiste Bouttats.

He is recorded back in Antwerp around 1711 where he became a member of the local Guild of Saint Luke in the same year. He was employed mainly on decorative commissions. He joined in 1716 the Antwerp Confrerie of Romanists when it was reconstituted on purely religious grounds. It was a condition of membership of the Confrerie that the member had visited Rome. He and Jan Pieter van Bredael the Younger were the last artists to become members of the Confrerie. In 1723 he became the dean of the Confrerie. The date and place of his death are not known.

He had many pupils in Prague and in Antwerp, the most prominent of whom was Marten Jozef Geeraerts.

== Work ==
Very few of his works have survived. He was a painter of history and decorative commissions.

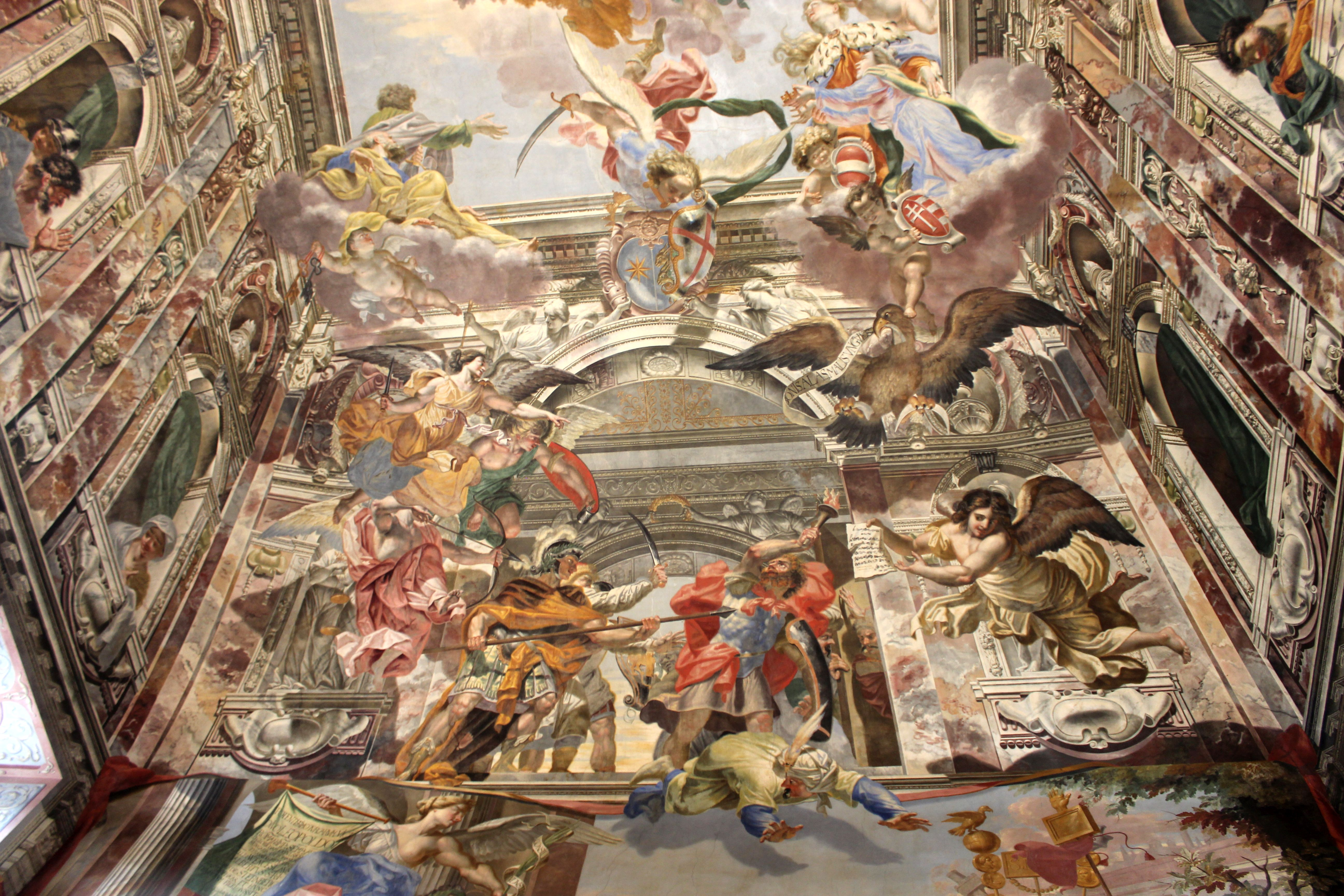
Janus temple, Troja Palace fresco

His best-known works are the frescos that he was commissioned to paint by Count Sternberk in the main room of the Troja Castle. The paintings, which he executed in the period 1691 to 1697 with the assistance of his brother Izaak, are considered to be among the best examples of Baroque fresco painting in Northern Europe. The fresco's use illusionist effects and narrate in a triumphalist way the history of the Habsburg Dynasty. The design follows the Baroque schema of architectural symbolism whereby the ceiling depicts the celestial world and the walls the terrestrial world. The ceiling is decorated with celestial beings that were said to protect the Habsburg territories. Underneath the curved surfaces below the ceiling, angels and putti are floating before trompe-l'œil architecture showing scenes from Habsburg history. The walls depict the terrestrial world with one of the scenes on the shorter walls celebrating the victory of Leopold I, Holy Roman Emperor over the Turks. In one scene we see the trompe-l'œil effect of a Turk falling down with his arms outstretched while his shadow is reflected on the painting (see illustration). The longer wall holds statues or busts of the Habsburg rulers in grisaille. In the fresco programme Abraham Godijn achieved a sophisticated and complex synthesis of fictionalist painting of architecture and lively figural scenes.

He painted a series of the seven sacraments for the monastery of Saint Martin in Pontoise (now in Pontoise Cathedral).
