= Piat Joseph Sauvage =

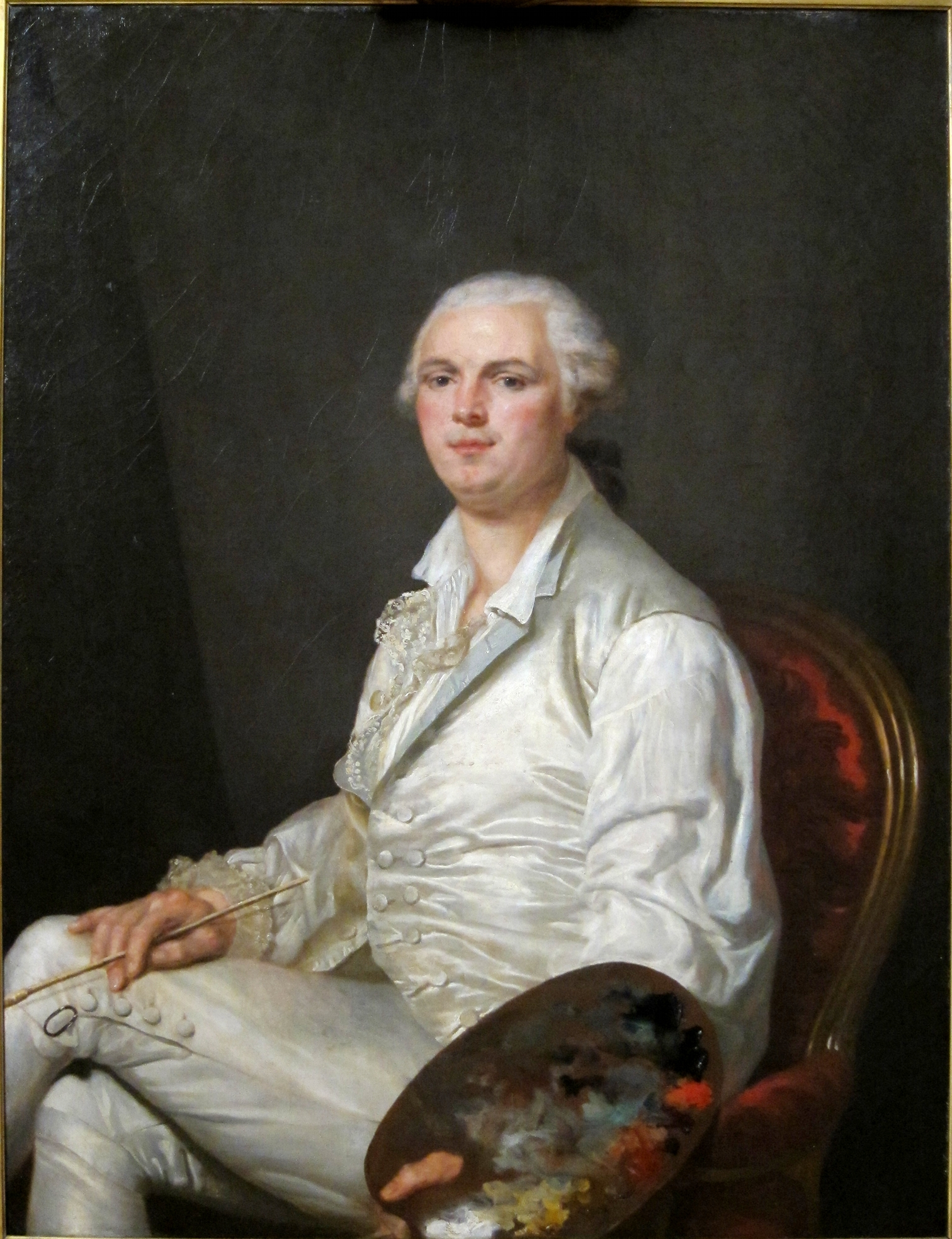
Portrait of Piat-Joseph Sauvage (1786) by Louis-Désiré-Joseph Donvé.

Piat Joseph Sauvage or Pieter Joseph Sauvage (19 January 1744 in Tournai – 11 June 1818 in Tournai) was a painter, sculptor, printmaker and academic lecturer from the Southern Netherlands. He was known for his decorative paintings of interiors, grisailles and miniatures using trompe l'oeil effects as well as his small-scale portrait carvings. He often used precious materials such as marble, porcelain and ivory as the support for his paintings. He was a court painter to the governor of the Southern Netherlands, the Prince de Condé and the French king Louis XVI and a member of the Académie royale de peinture et de sculpture.

== Life ==
Sauvage was born in Tournai as the son of Antoine, a glass cutter. He worked in his father's factory until the age of 17, while completing his study at the school of drawing in Tournai. He went on to improve his artistic education at the Antwerp Academy under the direction of Martin Joseph Geeraerts, an expert in grisaille and history paintings.

He worked for a time in Brussels in the service of the governor general of the Southern Netherlands. He then left for France where he joined the Académie de Saint-Luc in Paris. In 1774 he made nine paintings including grisaille bas-reliefs representing The Death of Germanicus.

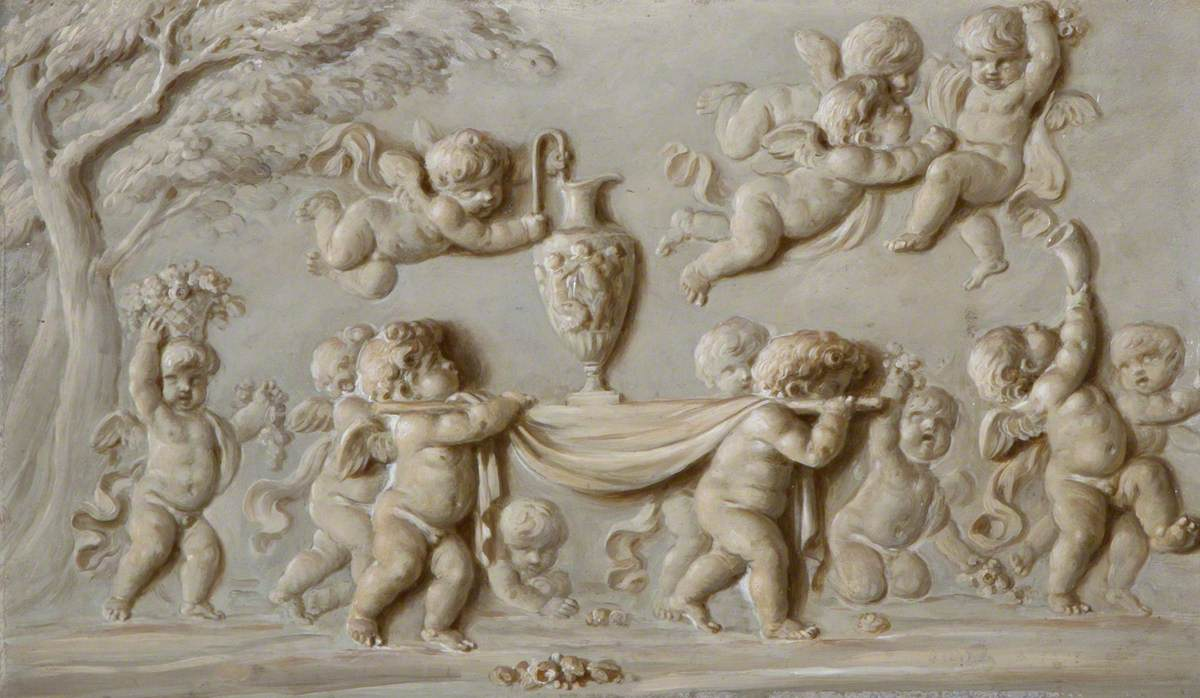
Infant Bacchanal, grisaille

Sauvage was accepted into the Académie royale de peinture et de sculpture after he produced a trompe l'oeil painting of a round table with an embroidered cloth on which are placed a statue of a child, a helmet, books, a violin, and other items. This canvas is at the Palace of Fontainebleau which also has other over the door decorative works by Sauvage.

As his fame grew, he was appointed the court painter of the Prince de Condé, and later of the French king Louis XVI and the Royal Family. During this period, he painted Marie-Antoinette and produced paintings for the chapel of Saint-Cloud.

His appointment as royal artist did not keep him from joining the popular side of the French Revolution. His painting surprisingly did not slow down during this period of political upheaval.

From 1804 to 1807, he painted porcelain figurines for the famous Sèvres porcelain factory.

In 1808 he returned to Tournai to become the director of the local Academy of Drawing. During his tenure, artists such as Antoine Payen studied there. He also painted the Seven Sacraments in the choir of Tournai cathedral which replaced tapestries stolen by the French during the French occupation of the Southern Netherlands.
