= Marten Jozef Geeraerts =

Flemish historical painter

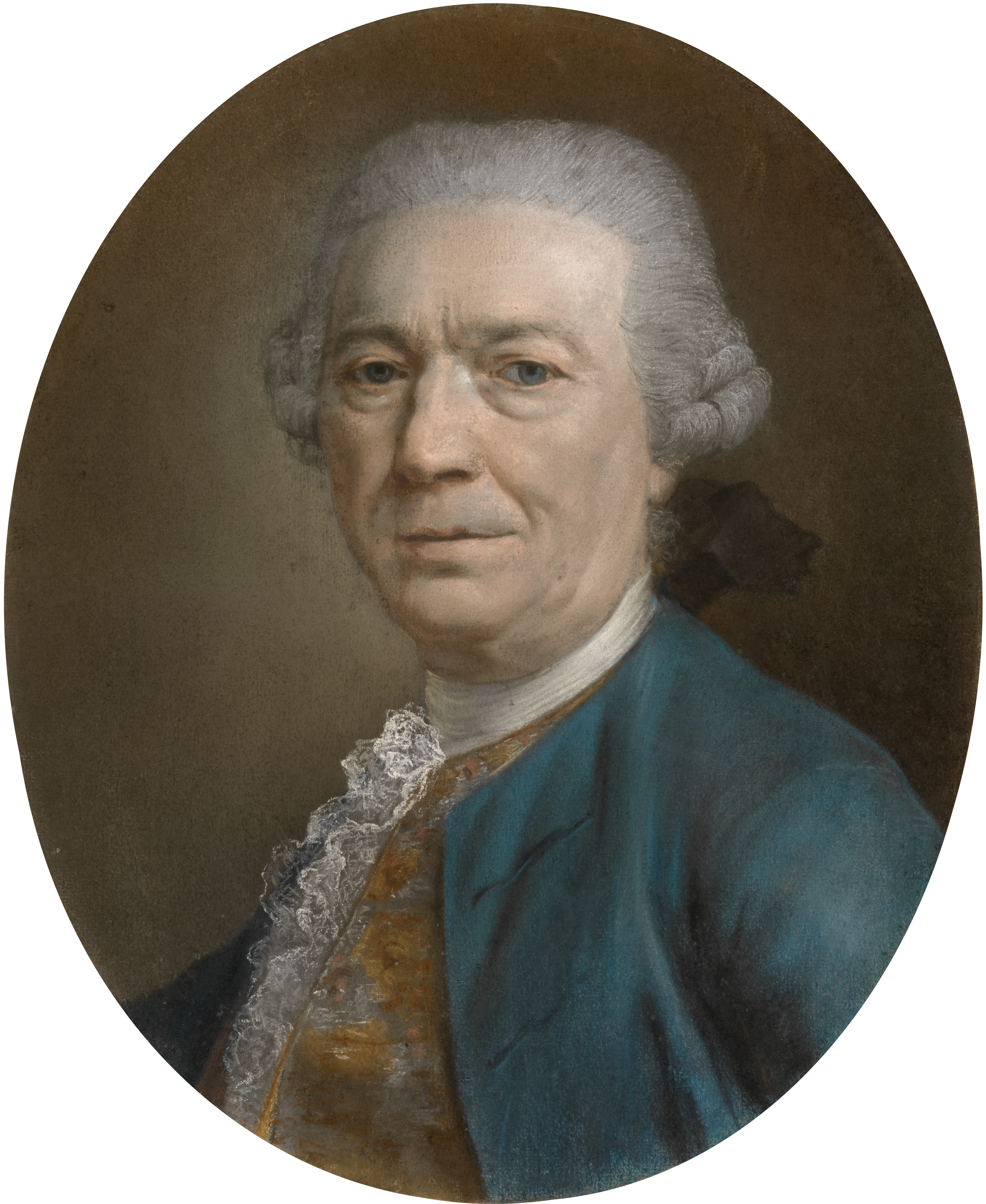
- Martinus Josephus Geeraerts by Balthasar Beschey, 1733
- Born: Early April 1707; Antwerp
- Died: 16 February 1791; Antwerp
- Occupation: Painter

Marten Jozef Geeraerts or Martinus Josephus Geeraerts (before 7 April 1707, Antwerp, Habsburg Netherlands – 16 February 1791, Antwerp) was a Flemish history painter and art teacher and director. He excelled in trompe-l'œil paintings of bas-reliefs executed in grisaille.

== Life ==
He was born in Antwerp as the son of the jeweller Jan Baptist and Anna Maria Borrekens and was baptized in the Antwerp Cathedral on 7 April 1707. His mother was also from a family of jewellers. His father intended his son to go into trade and had sent him to study at the Latin Jesuit College in Antwerp. When his drawing talent was discovered, it was decided he would train as an artist. In the Guild year 1723/24 when he was about 16 years old, he was registered as a pupil of Abraham Godijn at the Guild of St. Luke of Antwerp. Godijn was a history painter who, after a stay in Italy, worked for a time as a court painter in Prague where he produced magnificent Baroque frescos. He had later returned to Antwerp. Geeraerts followed for five year classes at the Academy of Antwerp where he was the second best pupil in drawing. He was admitted as a master of the Guild of Saint Luke of Antwerp in the Guild year 1731/32.

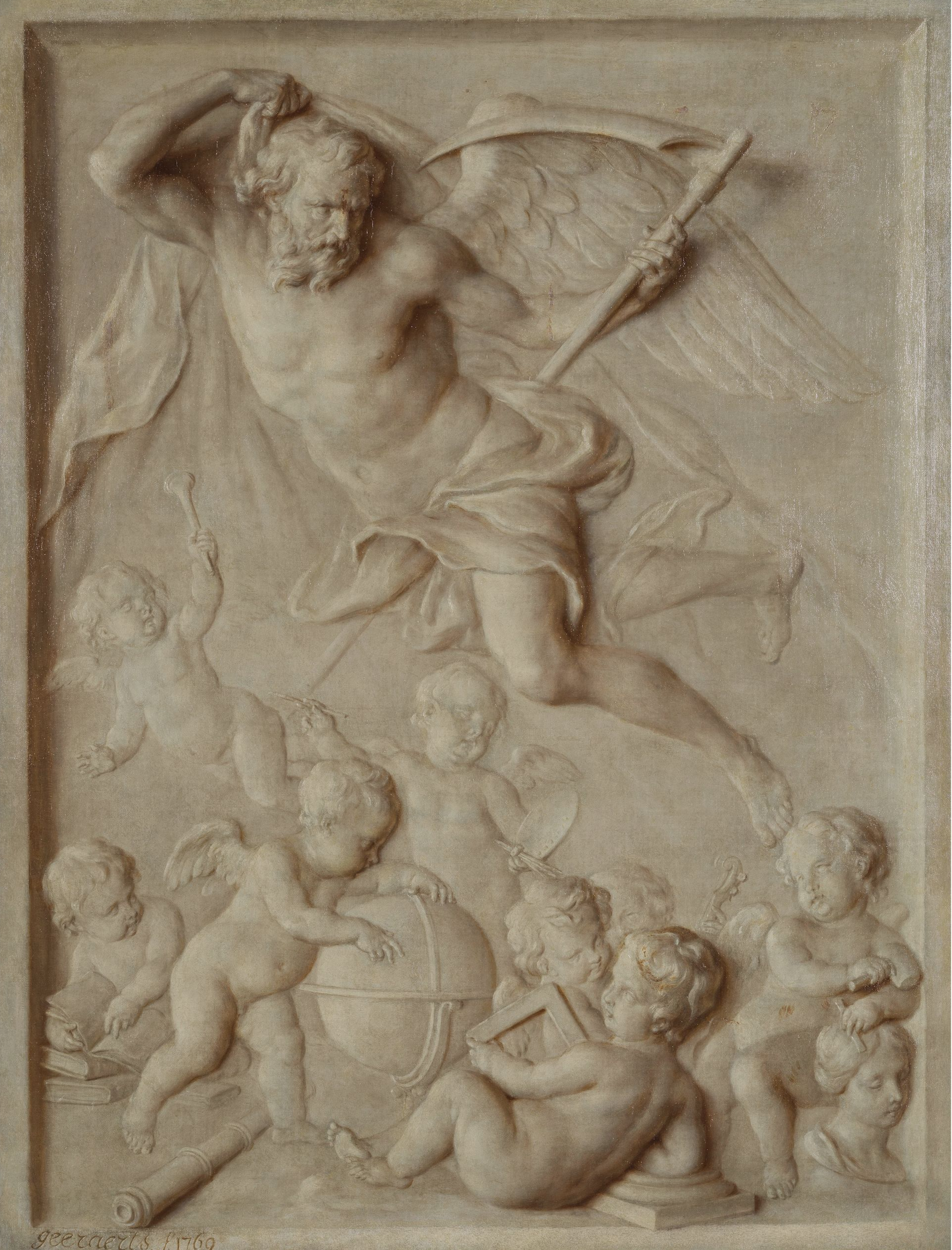
Allegory of Time

In 1741 he became one of the six directors of the Academy of Antwerp, who held that office for no payment as the Academy had no financial means. He also gave classes to students of the Academy. His students were local as well as from the Dutch Republic and France. They included Pieter Jan Balthazar de Gree, François-Louis Lonsing, Piat Joseph Sauvage, Theodoor Wynant Stalenbergh and Daniel de Wilde.

Geeraerts was well-off as his father had left him a fortune. In addition, he was fortunate to receive royal commissions from abroad. He had patrons in the Dutch Republic, Austria, Russia, Poland, England and Italy. Thus, there are grisailles of groups of children in the Lichtenstein Museum in Vienna, two of which are signed: M. J. Geeraerts f. Antjverpia 1752 and 1753.

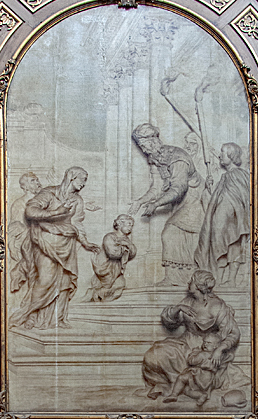
Presentation of Jesus, Cambrai Cathedral

On 22 August 1759 he was visited in his workshop on the Sint Nicolaasplaats, in the Lange Nieuwstraat by the Governor of the Habsburg Netherlands Prince Charles Alexander of Lorraine, the Governor's sister Princess Anne Charlotte of Lorraine, abbess of the Remiremont Abbey in France and Secular Abbess of the chapter of Noble Ladies of Saint Waltrude of Mons in Mons and a select entourage. They were accompanied by the Antwerp city magistrate. Two years later the Antwerp Academy was visited by William V, Prince of Orange for an entire day. When in 1786 Ferdinand Karl, Archduke of Austria-Este and his wife Maria Beatrice d'Este visited Antwerp they also attended his workshop to see his paintings.

He lived quite comfortably and remained a bachelor. In his old age, he lived with his nieces Theresia Josepha and Anna Maria de Bie, over whom he was guardian. These young ladies were also his heirs when he died at his home in the Hochstettersstraat on 16 February 1791.

He died in Antwerp on 16 February 1791 and he was buried in Antwerp Cathedral three days later with the board of the Academy, his art friends and admirers in attendance.

== Work ==
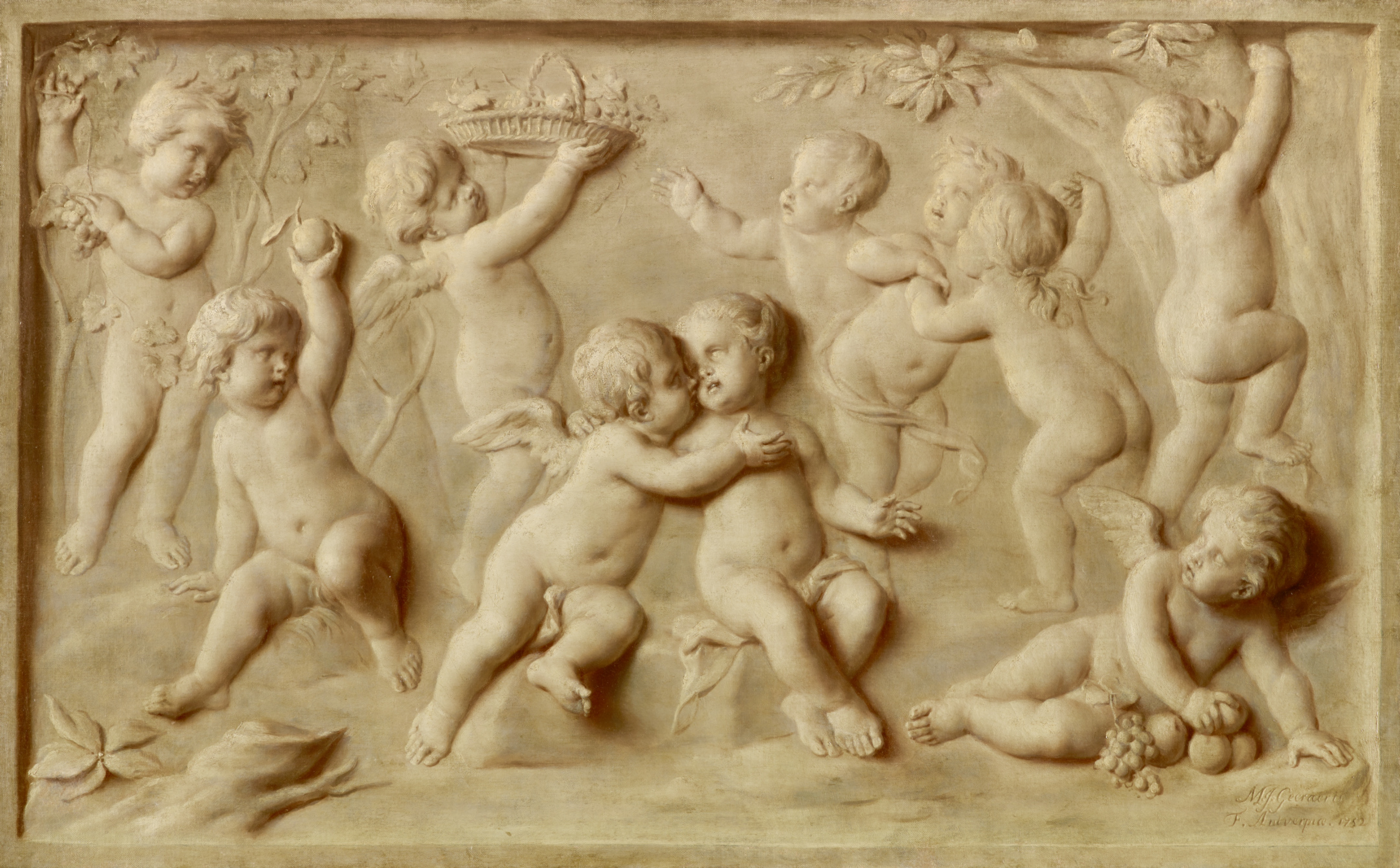
Children and Amoretti

Geeraerts originally painted in colour but from the 1740s solely painted in grisaille and trompe-l'œil paintings of wood and bronze. Grisaille painting had been popularised in the Dutch Republic by Jacob de Wit and this type of painting also become popular in the Habsburg Netherlands. This style of painting was likely influenced by Flemish monumental sculpture which flourished in Antwerp in the 17th and 18th centuries and was very influential in the Dutch Republic, in particular through the decorations by Artus Quellinus the Elder in the new city hall of Amsterdam and the works of Jan Pieter van Baurscheit the Younger. Geeraerts himself used casts of the reliefs of the Flemish sculptor François Duquesnoy for some of his works.

In his religiously themed grisailles he aimed to achieve a sculptural and three-dimensional effect. Between 1756 and 1760 he produced nine grisaille trompe-l'œil paintings for the abbey church in Cambrai which later became the Cambrai Cathedral. In these works Geeraerts achieved a very plastic effect. He also did not shy away from borrowing from other artists in the Cambrai works. An example are the grisailles of the Visitation and Descent of the Cross which are more or less copies from Rubens' treatment of these subjects in the Antwerp cathedral. In his secular works depicting groups of children or putti he uses a softer approach so that the trompe-l'œil reliefs appear to be made from wax rather than from marble or stucco.

== Major works ==
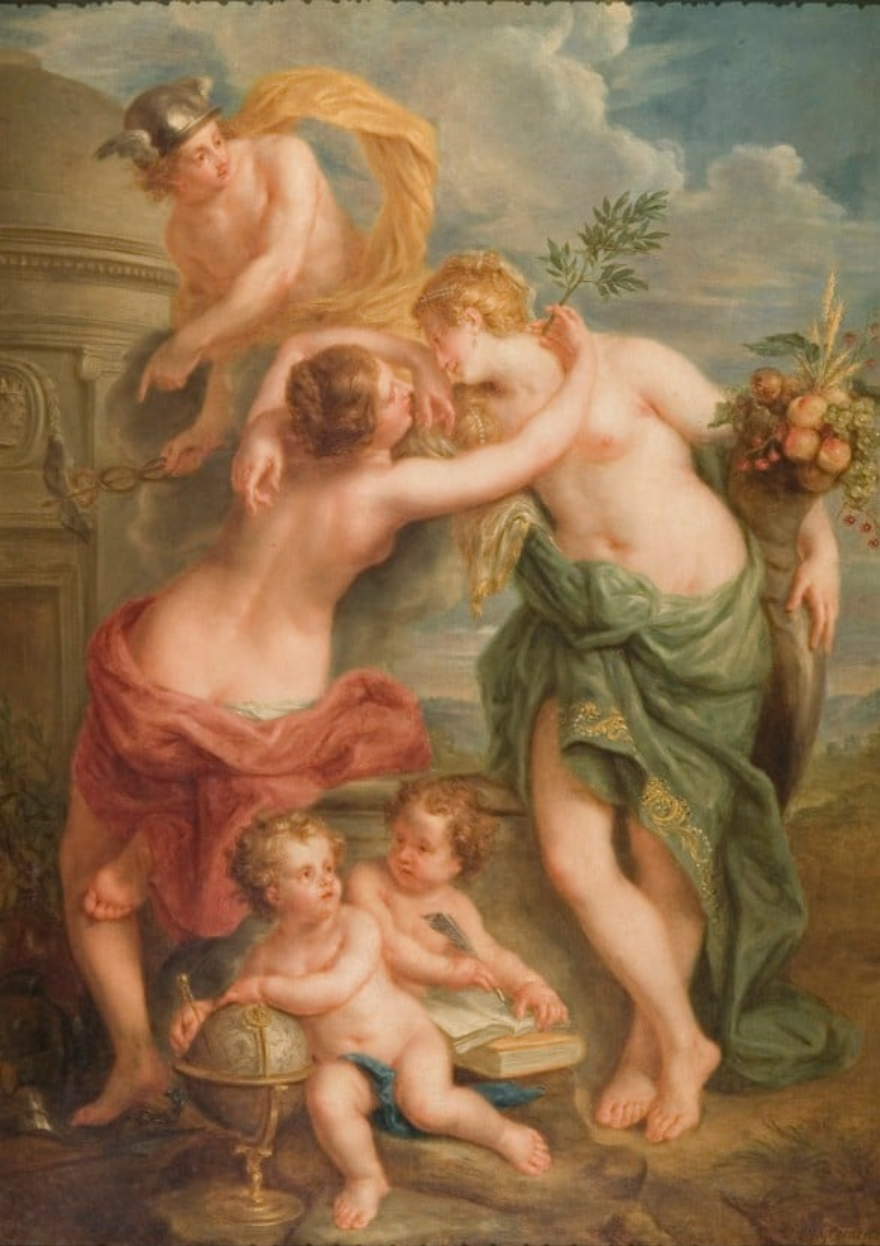
Allegory of Peace, Liechtenstein Museum

- Royal Museum of Fine Arts, Antwerp: The Fine Arts. 1760.
- Royal Museums of Fine Arts of Belgium:
  - Christ and the Disciples at Emmaus
  - The Saviour at the House of Simon the Pharisee
  - The Sons of Aaron punished by Fire from Heaven
  - The Woman taken in Adultery
  - Abraham and Melchisedeck
  - The Sacrifice of Abraham
  - The Sacrifice of Eli
- Mauritshuis: Autumn.
- Palais des Beaux-Arts de Lille: Children with Goat.
- Kunsthistorisches Museum: Trompe l'oeil: Basrelief mit Amor und Psyche.
- Liechtenstein Museum: Children and Amoretti, Putti with Hunting Equipment and Dead Game and Allegory of Peace.
