= Troja (Prague) =

Cadastral area in Prague, Czechia

- Cadastral Area of Prague
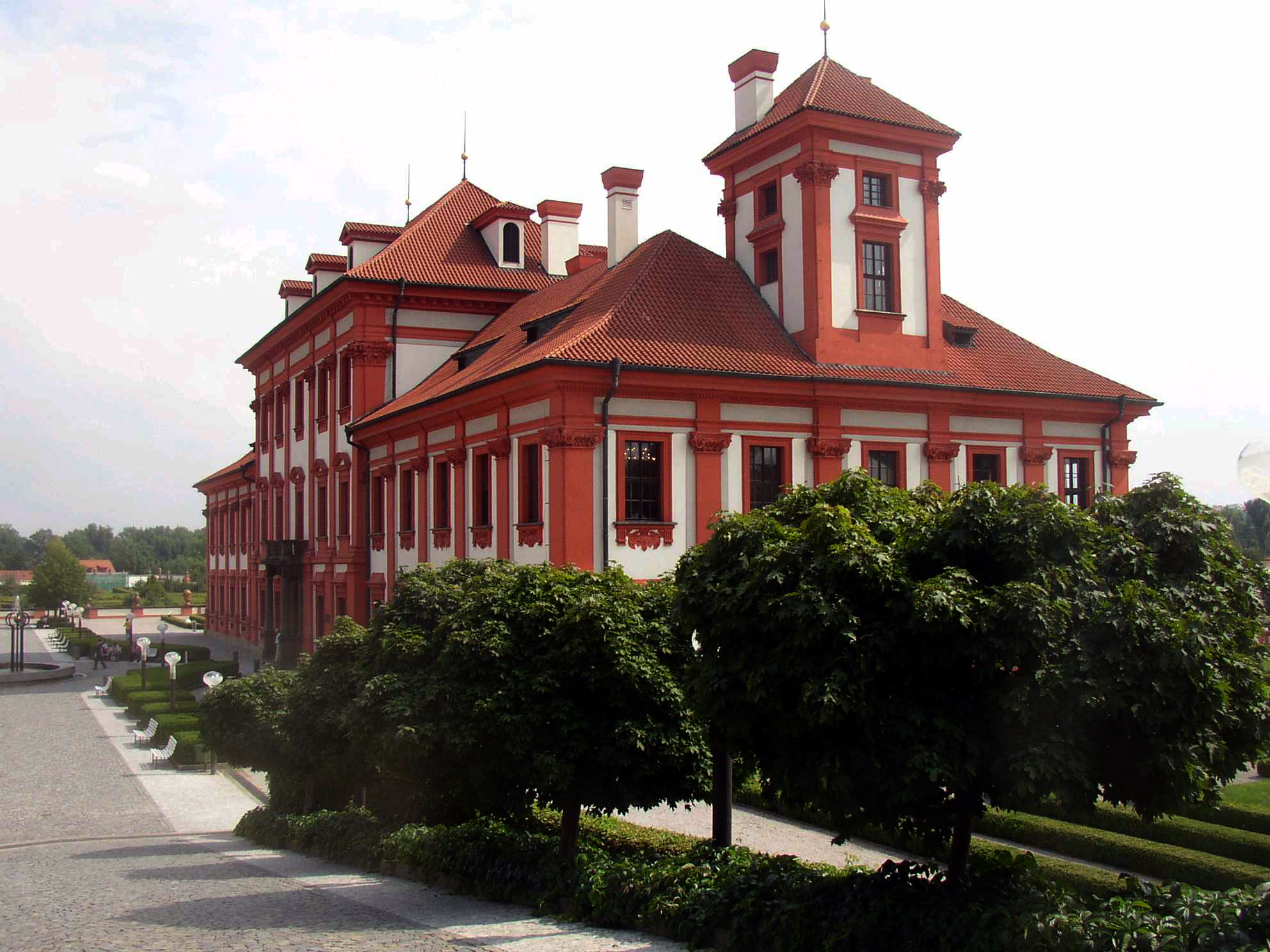
- Troja Palace

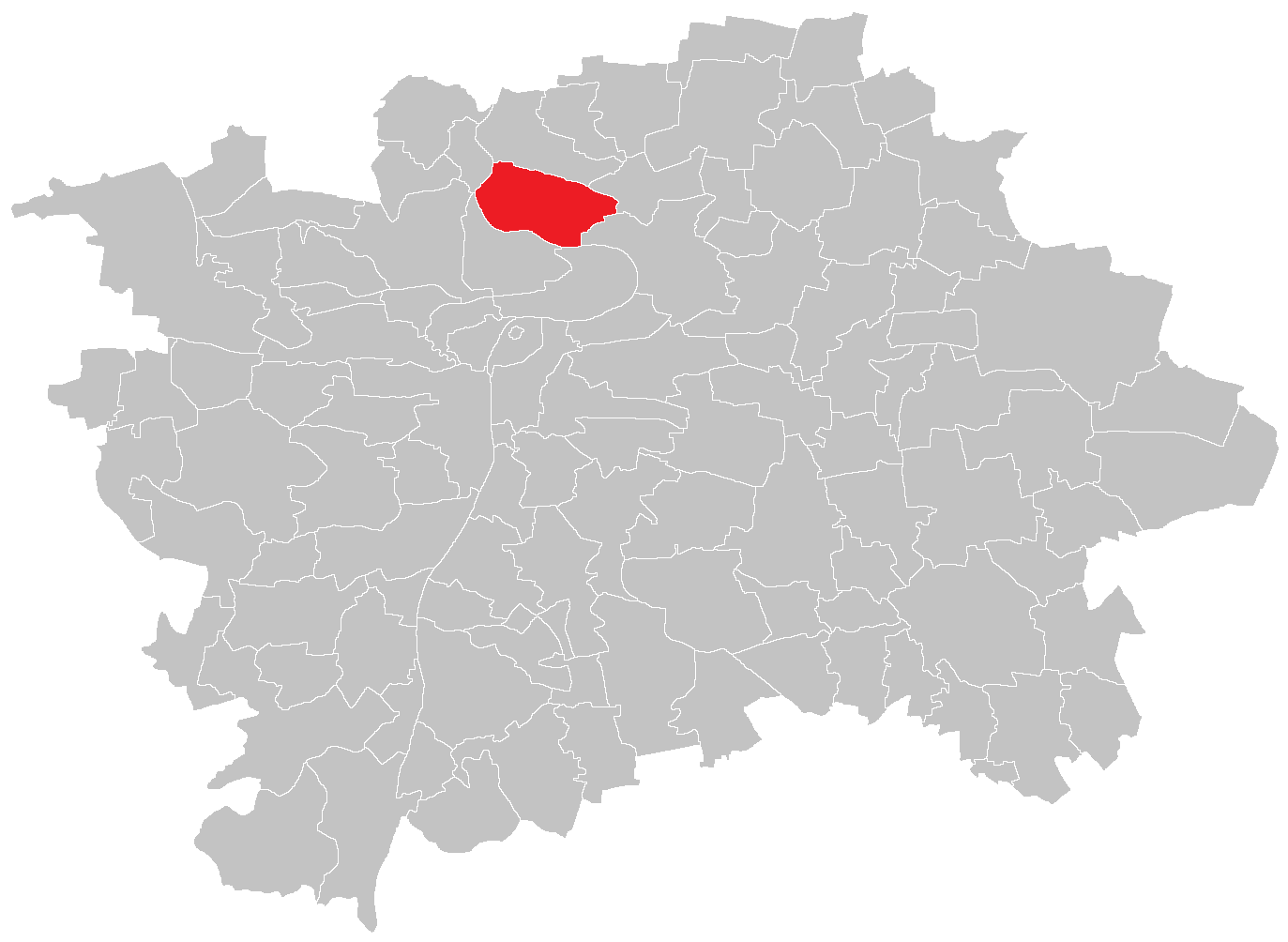
- Location of Troja in Prague
- Coordinates: 50°07′20″N 14°25′11″E
- Country: Czech Republic
- Region: Prague
- District: Prague-Troja, Prague 8

Area
  - Total: 5.43 km^{2} (2.10 sq mi)

Population (2021)
  - Total: 14,304
  - Density: 2,630/km^{2} (6,820/sq mi)
- Time zone: UTC+1 (CET)
  - Summer (DST): UTC+2 (CEST)
- Postal code: 171 00, 181 00, 182 00

Troja became part of Prague in 1922. Now it is part of the district of Prague 7, Prague 8 and its own cadastral area.

Troja is the site of Troja Palace, Prague Zoo and the Botanical Garden of Prague.

In Troja are also vineyards (vineyards vinice svaté Kláry and Salabka).

Due to its location, Troja is a desirable Prague district for many Czechs from business, sports or arts, among them Michael Kocáb, Dana Zátopková, Emil Zátopek, Bohdan Ulihrach, and Věra Chytilová.

== Demographics ==
Historical population

Year	Pop.	±%
1869	1,266	—
1880	1,388	+9.6%
1890	1,663	+19.8%
1900	1,895	+14.0%
1910	2,195	+15.8%
1921	2,081	−5.2%
1930	2,567	+23.4%
1950	2,828	+10.2%

Year	Pop.	±%
1961	3,158	+11.7%
1970	3,352	+6.1%
1980	14,885	+344.1%
1991	13,204	−11.3%
2001	12,816	−2.9%
2011	14,717	+14.8%
2021	14,304	−2.8%

Source: Censuses
