= Johann Baptiste Bouttats =

Flemish painter, draughtsman and etcher

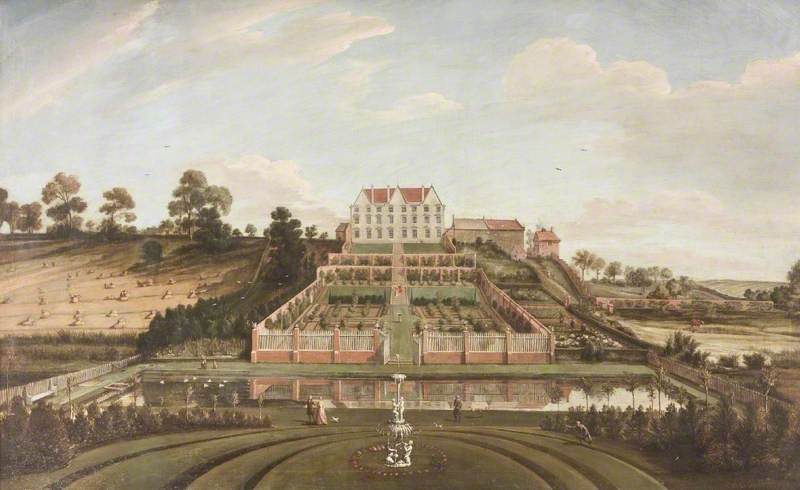
A Dutch mansion with garden

Johann Baptiste Bouttats or Jan Baptist Bouttats (1680s – 1743) was a Flemish painter, draughtsman and etcher who worked in a wide variety of genres including history, landscapes, architecture, topological views, marine scenes and still lifes. He was active in Antwerp, Bohemia, Silesia and England.

== Life ==
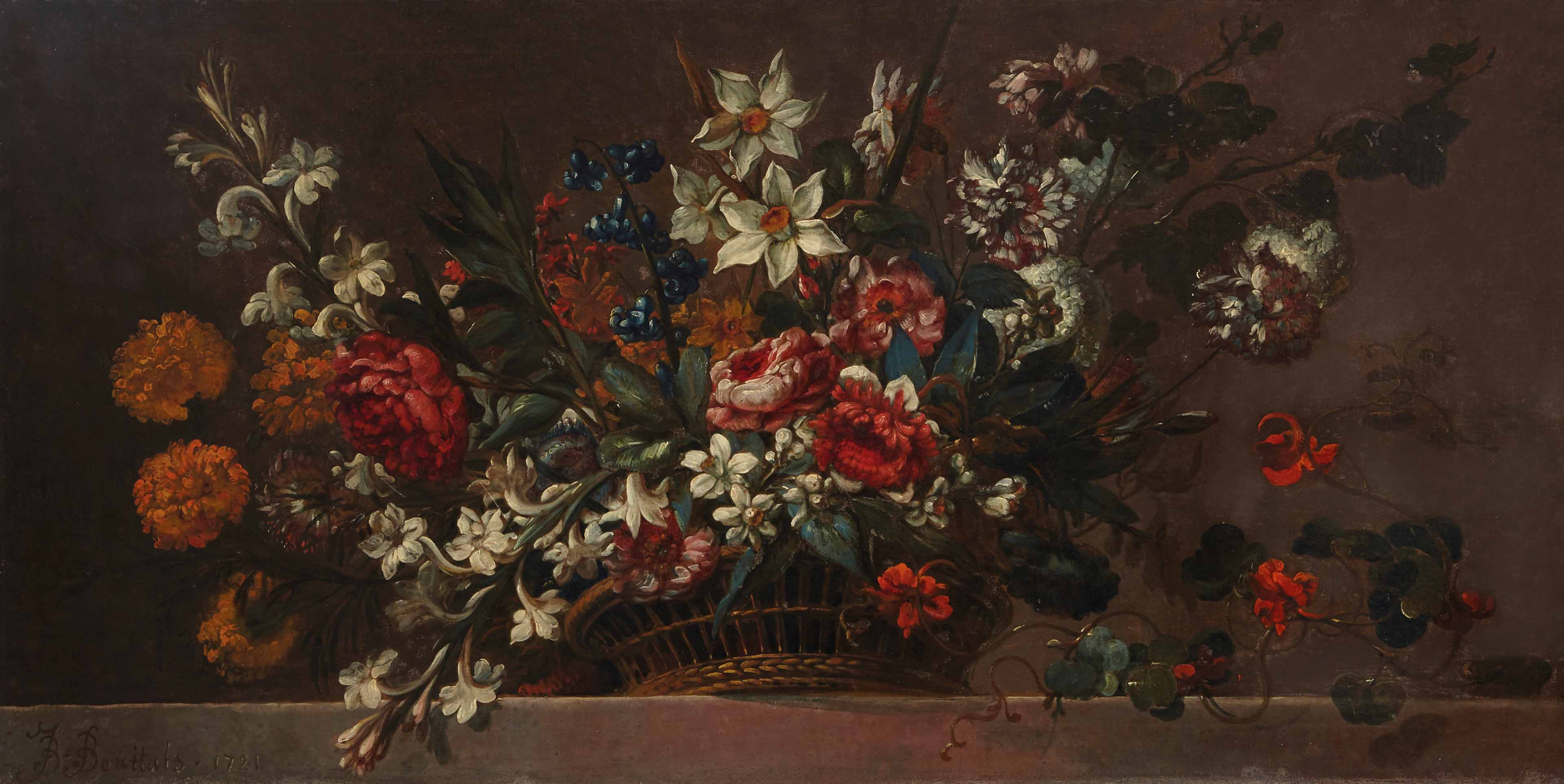
Basket of flowers on a ledge

There are very few details about Bouttats' early life and training. He was a member of the Bouttats family of artists, who were active in Antwerp and worked mainly as engravers and painters. He was likely born in Antwerp where he became master in the Guild of Saint Luke in 1707.

He was part of a group of artists who worked in 1687 for Wenzel Albert Duke of Sternberg on the decoration of the Troja Palace in Prague. This group included Flemish artists such as Abraham Godijn. The 19 paintings in Rychnov castle (listed there since 1796) are likely the decorations which Bouttats originally painted for the Troja Palace. He likely also worked for the Černín, Kolowrat and Gallas families in Bohemia and Silesia.

He emigrated to England in the 1720s, where he settled in Hull (then York). He is known to have had two sons who were born in Flanders. One of them stayed in Hull and another named John (1712-after 1768) moved to London. John was a painter, art restorer and art dealer. Thanks to his contacts in Antwerp John was able to import several paintings from Antwerp collections into England in the 1760s.

Johann Baptiste died in 1743.

== Work ==
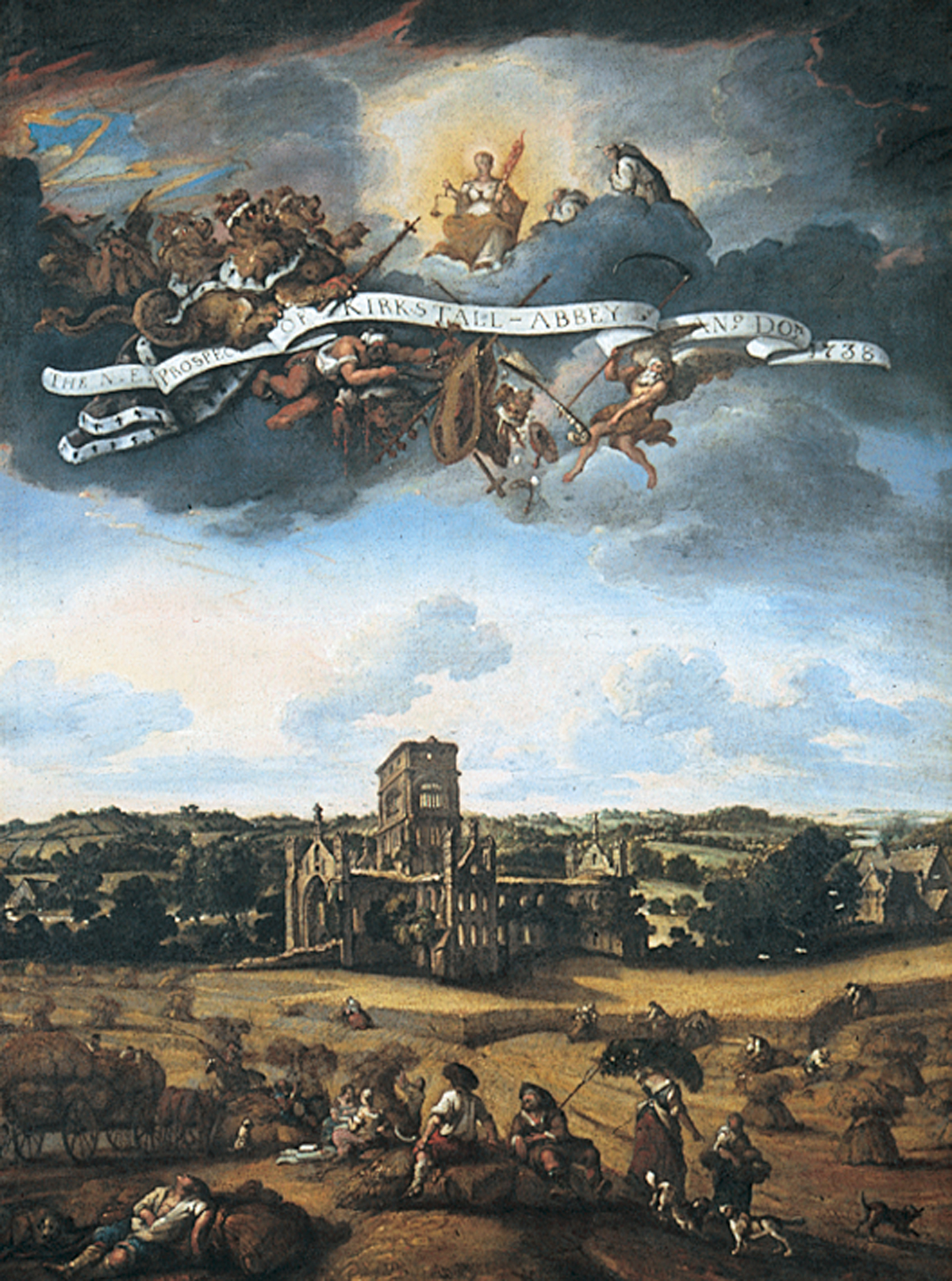
North East Prospect of Kirkstall Abbey

Bouttats was known as a jobbing artist, turning his hand to a number of different subjects and genres and working as a painter as well as an engraver. The range of his subjects included history, landscapes, architecture, topological panoramas, marine scenes and still lifes. Most of his works are found in Bohemia and Silesia.

He painted three views of Kirkstall Abbey from three different directions. The paintings are topographical views and include views of the surrounding landscape with peasants engaging in various rural activities. The North East Prospect of Kirkstall Abbey includes some mythological figures and animals on a cloud hovering over the scene and the title of the painting.

During his stay in England he also painted a scene of A Dutch Mansion with Garden, signed and dated 1730. It is not clear whether the painting represents a specific mansion (some have suggested Huis Rijswijk in Gelderland in the Dutch Republic) or perhaps an ideal, imaginary house.

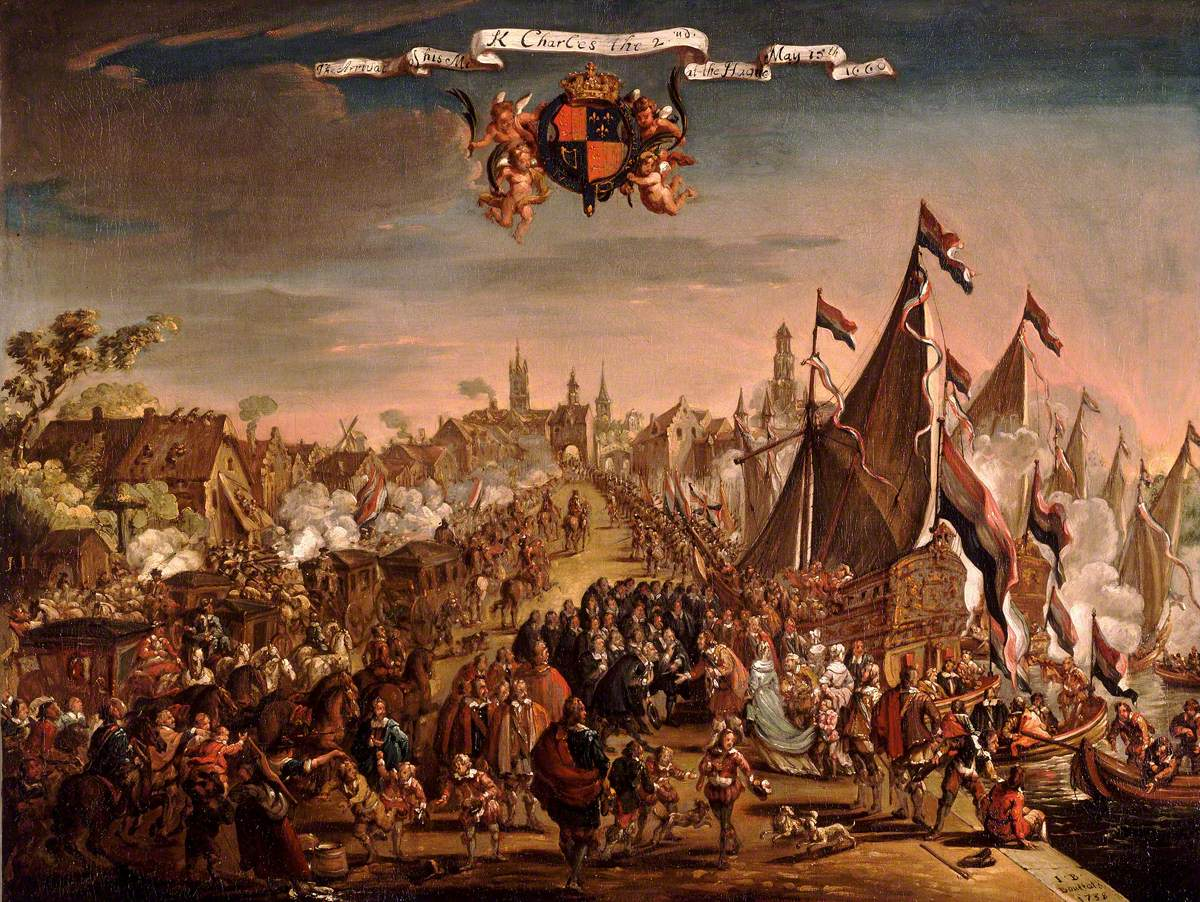
The arrival of Charles II at The Hague, 15 May 1660

The National Maritime Museum in Greenwich has two paintings by Bouttats. The Shipping Scene in the Lower Thames, about 1720 depicts a river scene with a warship announcing its arrival by firing its guns amidst other ships including a Dutch flute (a merchant ship). The painting entitled The Arrival of Charles II at The Hague, 15 May 1660 dated 1738 depicts the events leading to the Restoration of Charles II of England. It shows the process of disembarkation by Charles II when he arrived at The Hague and was greeted by courtiers. The painting was likely based on prints.

A few still lifes by him are known. A flower still life painting of Flowers in a porcelain bowl dated 1721 was sold at Bonhams. It represents flowers in a bowl placed on a stone plinth. A similar painting dated 1728, which was an overdoor piece, was sold by Christie’s. These still lifes are painted with a broad brush and less detail than the paintings in the National Maritime Museum.

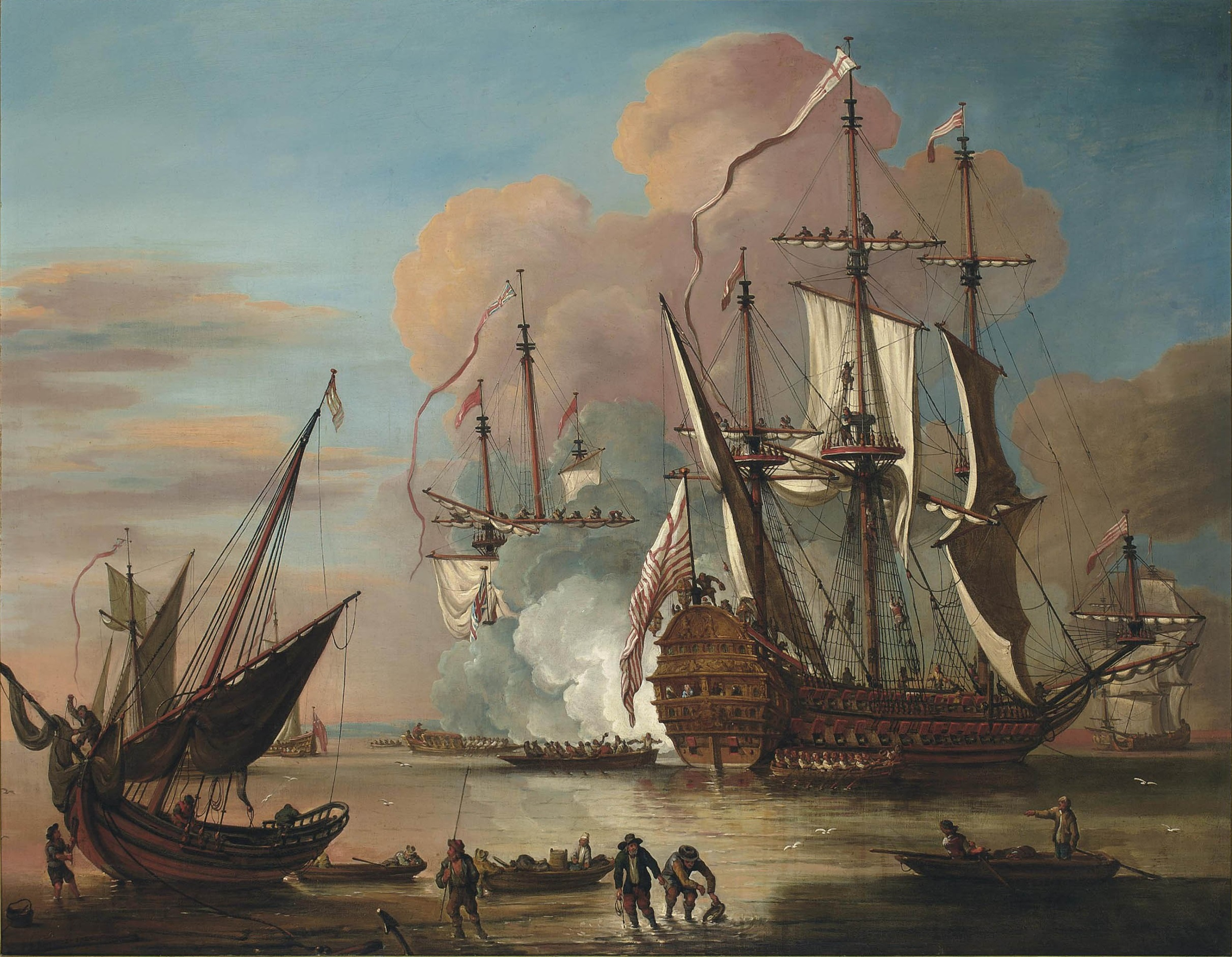
An honourable East India Company flagship returning to home waters in triumph

Several hunting still lifes and scenes with live animals in old collections in the Czech Republic and Poland bear the signature J. Bouttats. Often they are catalogued as works by Johann Baptist Bouttats. However, in view of the delicate hand and bright palette and the fact that all these paintings are located in Central Europe, this J. Bouttats was likely a different painter.
