= Bouttats =

The Bouttats were a family of Flemish engravers active in the 17th and early 18th centuries. The family included:

- Frederik Bouttats the Elder (born ca. 1590–1661)
- Frederik Bouttats the Younger (born ca. 1620)
- Gaspar Bouttats (ca. 1625 – 1703), Frederik the Younger's younger half-brother
- Gerard Bouttats (born ca. 1630 – after 1668), Frederik the Younger's younger half-brother and brother of Gaspar
- Johann Baptiste Bouttats (1680s – 1743), a painter active in England
- Philibert Bouttats (ca. 1650 – ca. 1722), Frederik the Younger's son
