= Guild of Romanists =

16th-18th century society in Antwerp

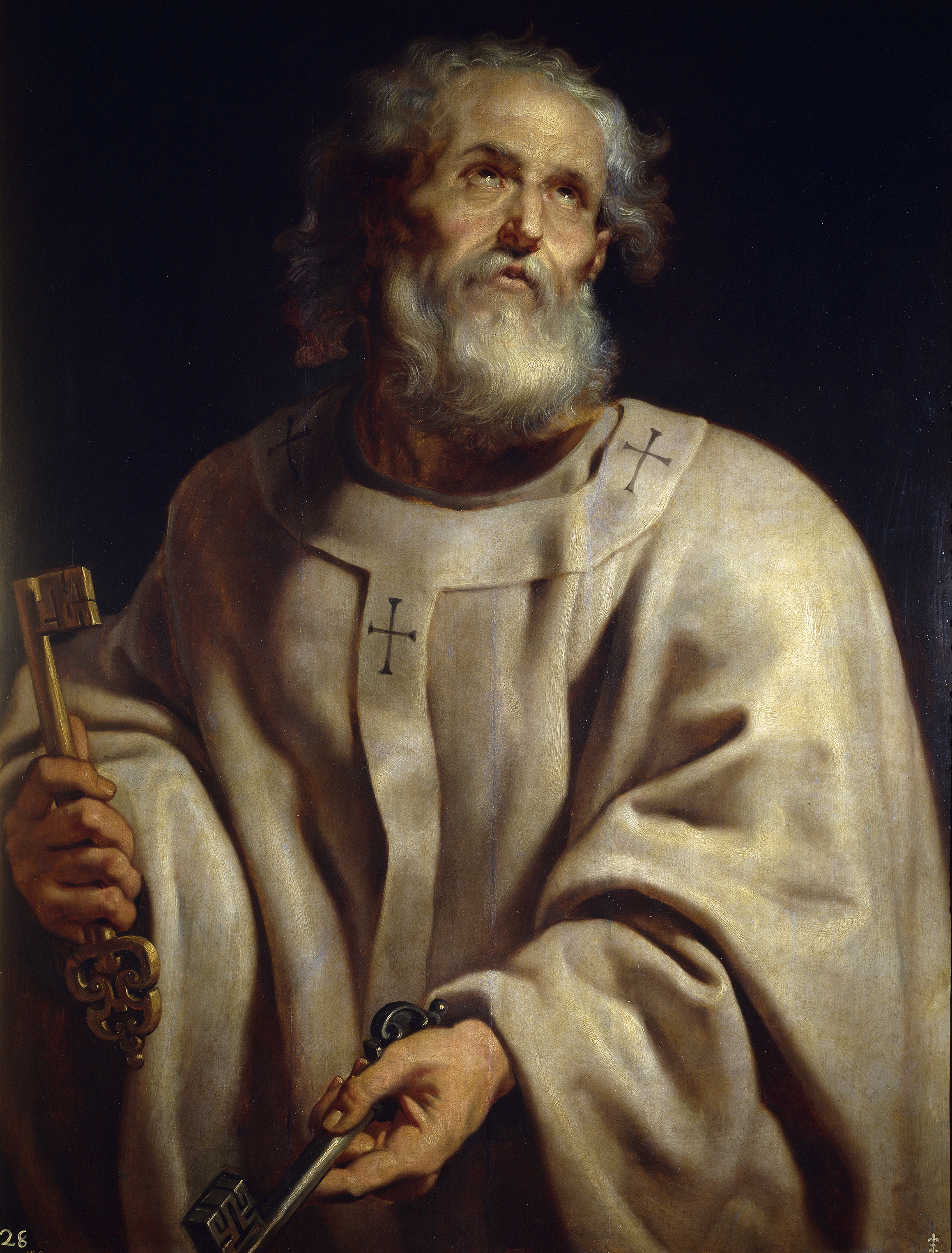
Saint Peter by Rubens

The Guild of Romanists or Confrérie van romanisten was a society which was active in Antwerp from the late 16th to the late 18th century. Its membership was made up of notables and artists from Antwerp who had visited Rome. It offered artists access to the networks of Antwerp's urban elites.

== History ==
The Guild was established in 1572 in Antwerp's Cathedral of Our Lady under the patronage of St. Paul and St. Peter and was therefore also known as the 'Broederschap van de HH. Petrus en Paulus' (Confrérie of St. Peter and Paul). It was a condition of membership to have visited Rome. The condition of having visited Rome to enjoy membership appears to have been strictly enforced and art historians accept membership of the Guild as evidence of visits to Rome that are (in the case of Fyt etc.) otherwise undocumented.

The membership included canons, prosperous merchants, members of the local nobility, aldermen and leading artists. Total membership was capped at 25 members, which reinforced the exclusive character of the society. Deans of the Guild were appointed annually.

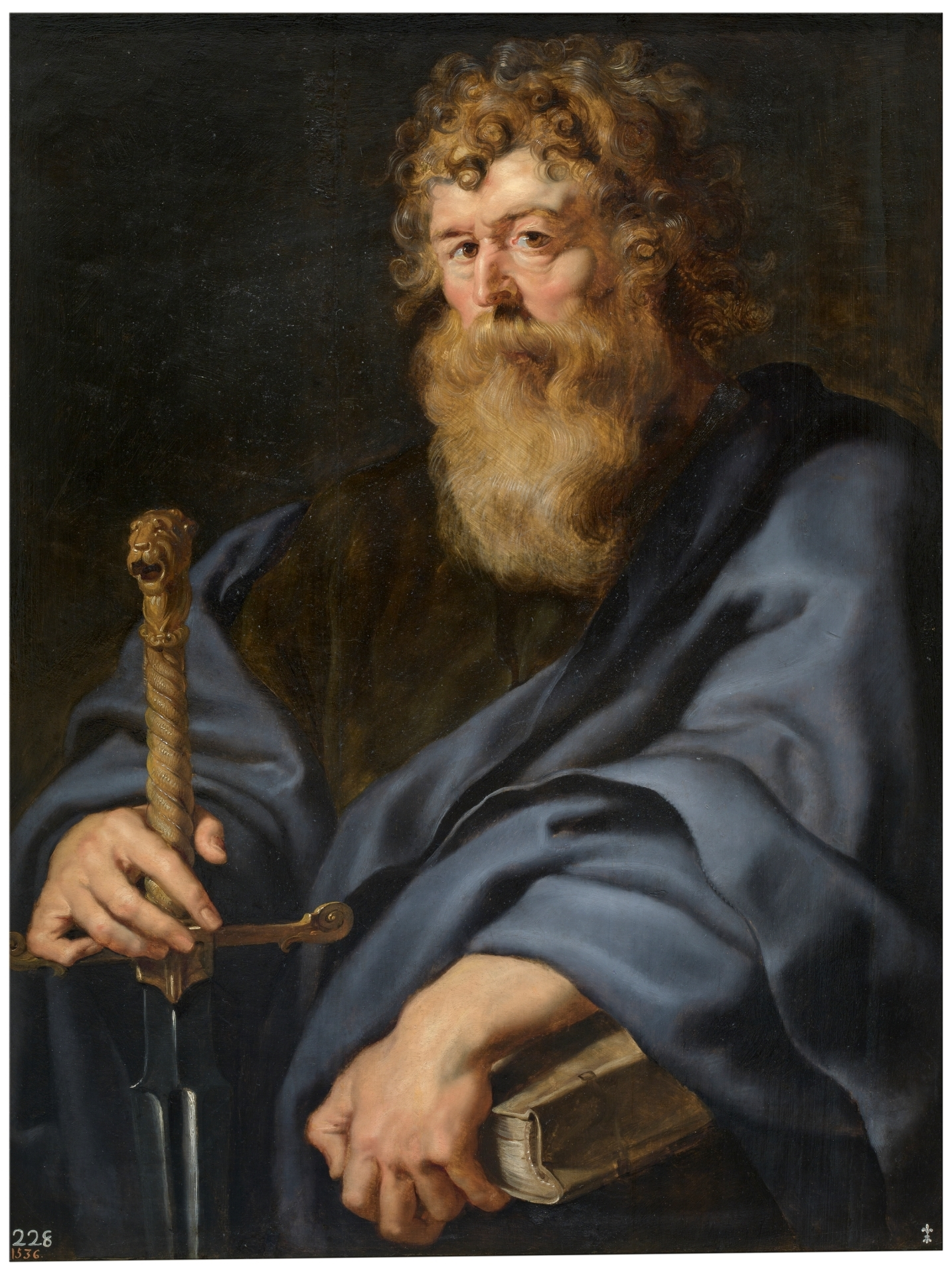
Saint Paul by Rubens

After 1680 the Guild went into decline. The Guild moved in 1681 for financial reasons to Antwerp's St George's Church and remained dormant for a few decades. It was revived in 1716 when the 'true and approved' relics of St. Peter and Paul were delivered to St George's Church by a Roman cardinal. The Guild was finally abolished in 1785 under the rule of the Emperor Joseph II of Austria.

A Magistrate Book (1576), the "LIBER CONFRATERNITATIS SANCTORUM PETRI ET PAULI EN ROMA' is kept in the State Archives of Belgium.

== Significance ==
The diversity of the membership offered artists a good opportunity to meet with potential patrons. A similar social mediation role was played by the chambers of rhetoric and in particular the Violieren, which was the chamber of rhetoric of the Antwerp Guild of Saint Luke. Membership assisted artists further in raising their profile and prestige in society at large as well as among their fellow artists since only renowned artists were invited to join.

The non-artist members relied on membership of the Guild to consolidate their social standing since many of the artist members enjoyed an international reputation.

The social role of the Guild was facilitated through the institution of an annual gastronomic dinner (the '(h)eerlyck maeltyt'), with excellent wines and copious servings of food. The dinner was hosted at different locations.

The Guild further allowed "'art-pilgrims' to keep themselves up to date on news from Rome, whether it be on new painters or paintings, or newly discovered antiquities".

== Notable members ==
- Maerten de Vos - Co-founder
- Jan Brueghel the Elder,1599
- Wenceslas Cobergher, 1605
- Otto van Veen, Dean 1606
- Abraham Janssens, 1610 or 1601
- Hendrick van Balen, Dean 1613
- Peter Paul Rubens, 1609, Dean 1613-14
- Frans Snyders, 1619, Dean 1629
- Jan Fyt, 1650, Dean 1652
- Abraham Godijn, joined in 1716 and was Dean in 1723
