= Troja Palace =

Building in Prague, Czech Republic

Coordinates: 50°06′59″N 14°24′46″E

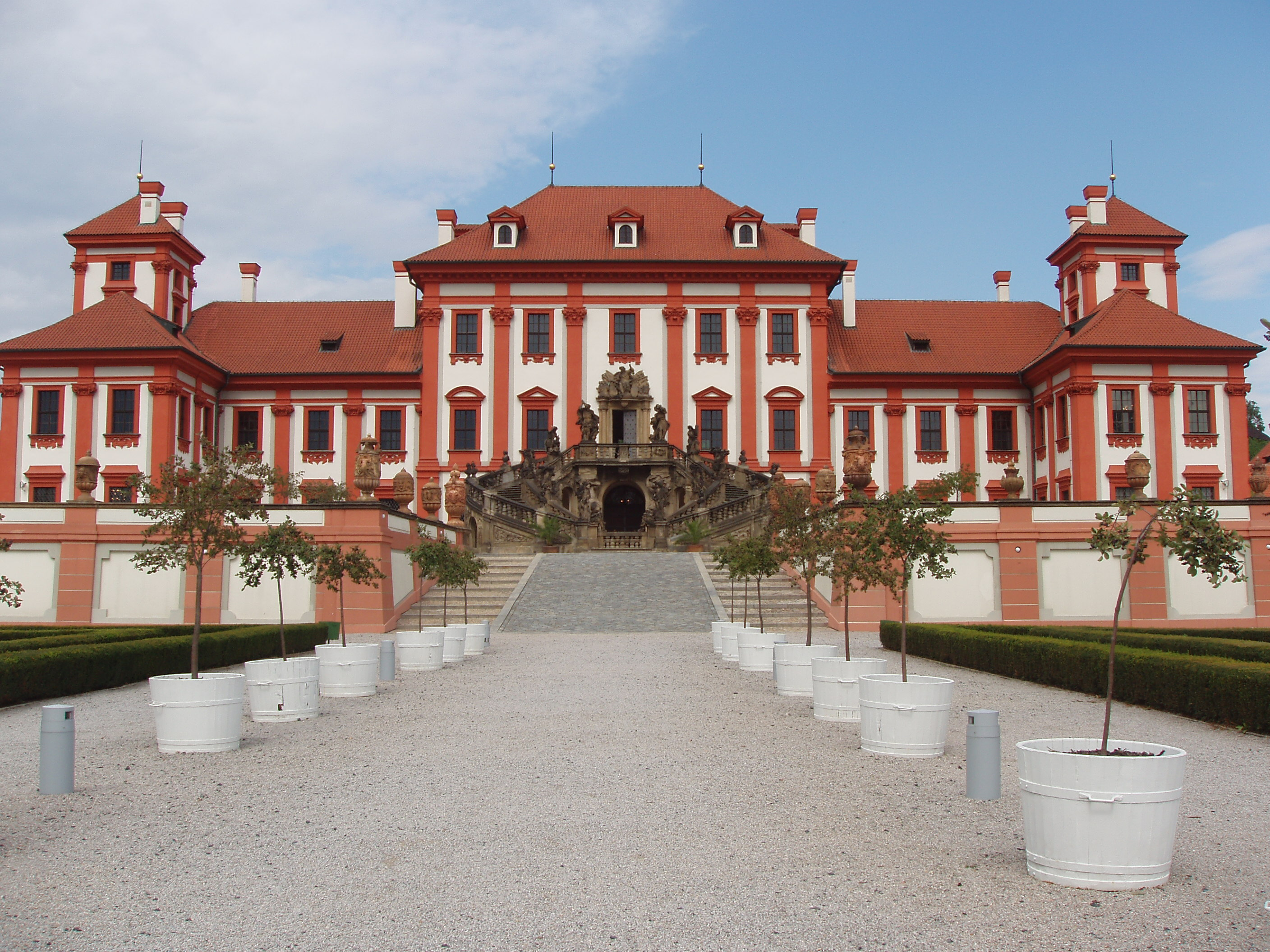
Troja Palace, Prague

Troja Palace (Czech: Zámek Troja) is a Baroque palace located in Troja, Prague's north-west borough (Czech Republic). It was built for the Counts of Sternberg from 1679 to 1691. The palace is owned by the city of Prague and hosts the 19th century Czech art collections of the City Gallery.

== Construction ==
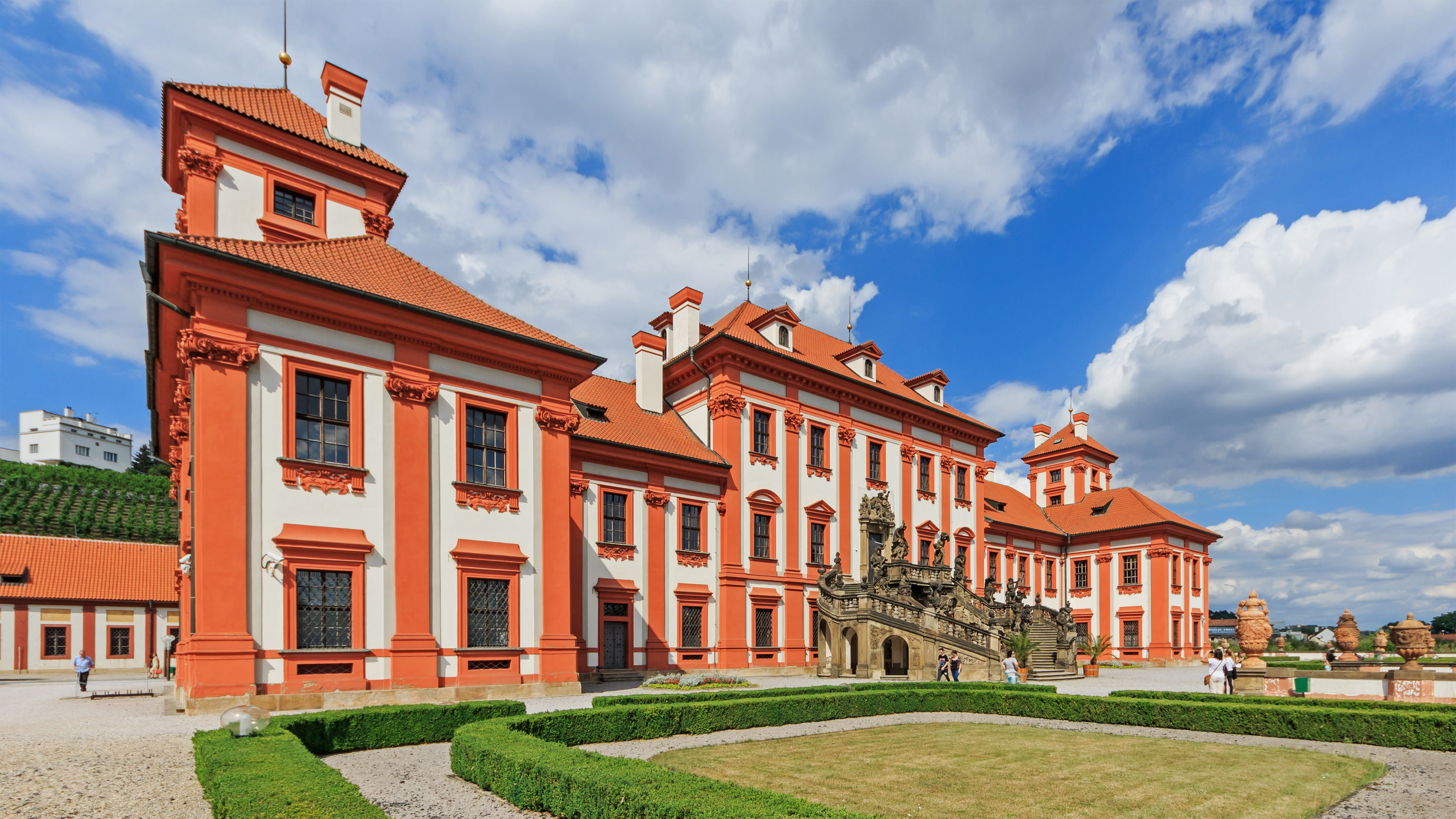
View of Troja Palace

The palace's design has been influenced by French and Italian architecture and is mostly the work of French architect Jean Baptiste Mathey. The latter also built the palais Buquoy in Prague, currently the French embassy. Prior to Mathey, Domenico Orsi worked on the castle. Silvestro Carlone was the Master Builder.

== Gardens ==
The stairs between the palace and the gardens are the work of two sculptors from Dresden: Johann Georg and Paul Heermann. They sculpted statues representing the fight of gods and giants. The terrace is decorated with a rare collection of vases made by Bombelli, also active in Slavkov u Brna, at Slavkov-Austerlitz castle (close to Brno). The central axis of the garden projects towards the spires of the St. Vitus Cathedral in the Prague Castle.

== Decoration ==
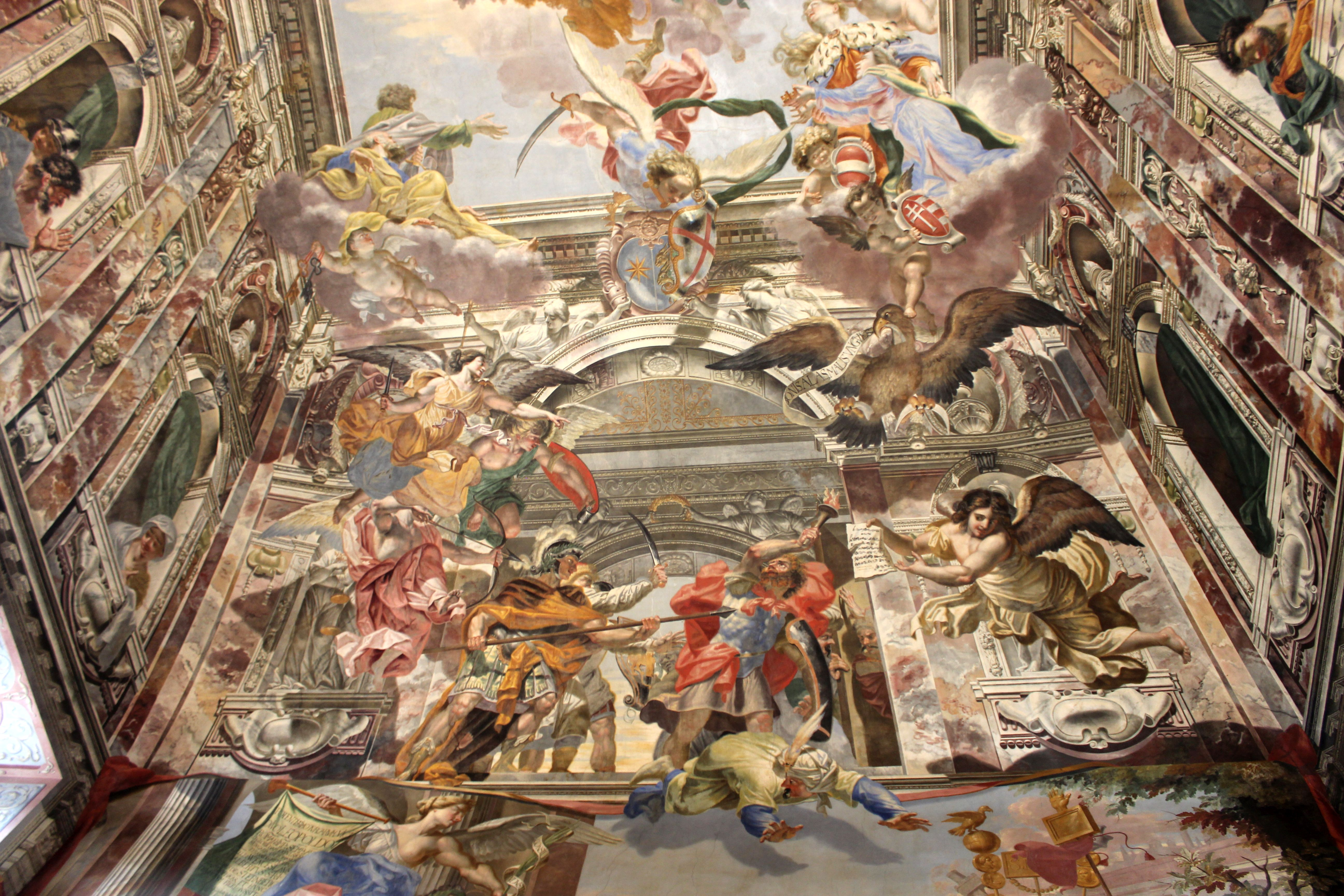
Frescos by Abraham and Izaak Godijn

The palace's main room is decorated with a magnificent baroque Habsburg's apotheosis. Many mythological elements are presented in this trompe-l'œil decoration. It was realised by the brothers Abraham and Izaak Godijn, painters from Antwerp who commenced their work at the castle in 1690. The paintings are considered to be among the best examples of Baroque fresco painting in Northern Europe. The fresco's use illusionist effects and narrate in a triumphalist way the history of the Habsburg Dynasty. The design follows the Baroque schema of architectural symbolism whereby the ceiling depicts the celestial world and the walls the terrestrial world. The ceiling is decorated with celestial beings that were said to protect the Habsburg territories. Underneath the curved surfaces below the ceiling, angels and putti are floating before trompe-l'œil architecture showing scenes from Habsburg history. The walls depict the terrestrial world with one of the scenes on the shorter walls celebrating the victory of Leopold I, Holy Roman Emperor over the Turks. In one scene we see the trompe-l'œil effect of a Turk falling down with his arms outstretched while his shadow is reflected on the painting (see illustration). The longer wall holds statues or busts of the Habsburg rulers in grisaille. The fresco programme achieved a sophisticated and complex synthesis of fictionalist painting of architecture and lively figural scenes.

Francesco Marchetti and his son Giovanni realised most of the other paintings in the castle.

== Recent history ==
The palace was bought in 1922 by the Czechoslovak state, which started a restoration in the seventies. Since this period the palace has been hosting an exhibition of Czech paintings of the 19th century: Josef Čermák, Václav Brožík, Julius Mařák, Antonin Chittussi, Jan Preisler, Mikoláš Aleš.

== See also ==
- List of Baroque residences
